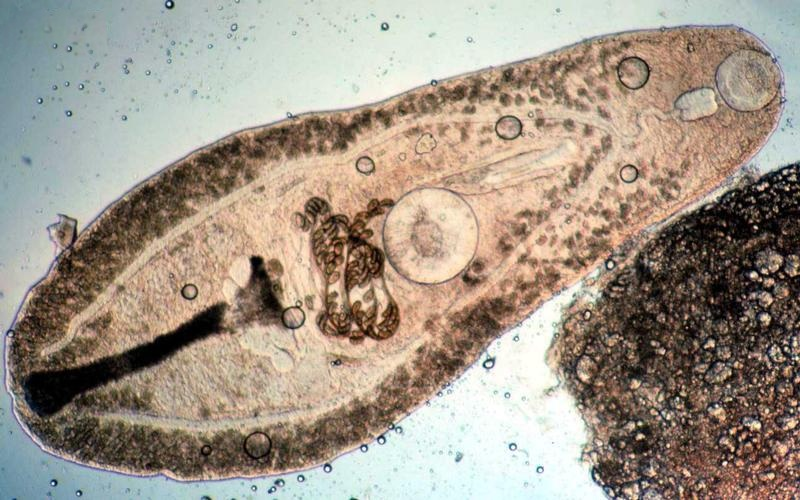
- Helicometra sp. (Plagiorchiida: Opecoelidae) from the intestine of a Flame Cardinal fish

Scientific classification
- Kingdom: Animalia
- Phylum: Platyhelminthes
- Subphylum: Rhabditophora
- Superclass: Neodermata
- Class: Trematoda
- Subclass: Digenea; Carus, 1863

Families
- See text.

= Digenea =

Class of flukes

Digenea (Gr. Dis – double, Genos – race) is a subclass of trematodes in the Platyhelminthes phylum, consisting of parasitic flatworms (known as flukes) with a syncytial tegument and, usually, two suckers, one ventral and one oral. Adults commonly live within the digestive tract, but occur throughout the organ systems of all classes of vertebrates. Once thought to be related to the Monogenea, it is now recognised that they are closest to the Aspidogastrea and that the Monogenea are more closely allied with the Cestoda. Around 6,000 species have been described to date.

== Morphology ==
=== Key features ===
Characteristic features of the Digenea include a syncytial tegument; that is, a tegument where the junctions between cells are broken down and a single continuous cytoplasm surrounds the entire animal. A similar tegument is found in other members of the Neodermata; a group of platyhelminths comprising the Digenea, Aspidogastrea, Monogenea and Cestoda. Digeneans possess a vermiform, unsegmented body-plan and have a solid parenchyma with no body cavity (coelom) as in all platyhelminths.

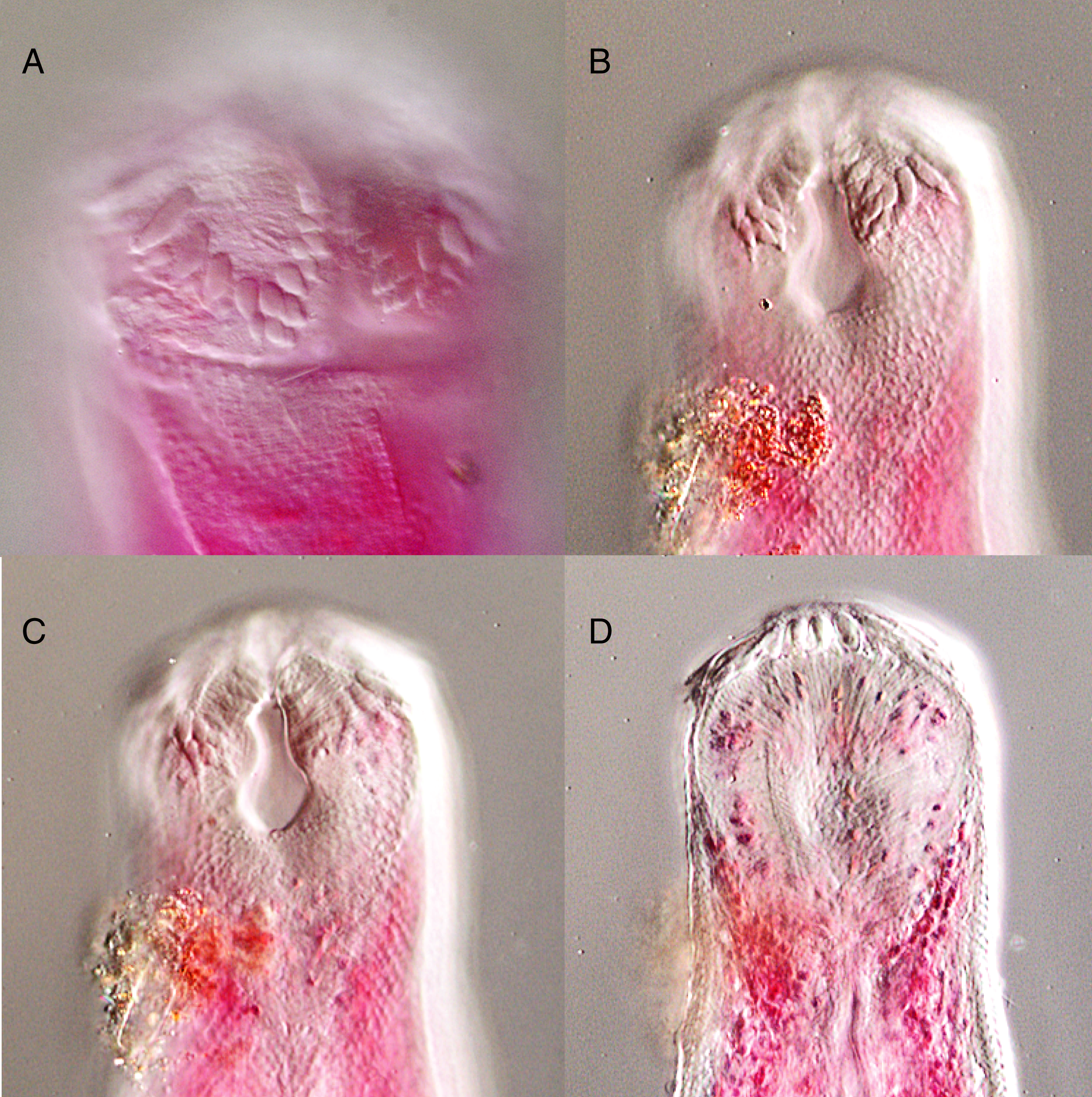
Anterior sucker of Overstreetia cribbi a zoogonid digenean

There are typically two suckers, an anterior oral sucker surrounding the mouth, and a ventral sucker sometimes termed the acetabulum, on the ventral surface. The oral sucker surrounds the mouth, while the ventral sucker is a blind muscular organ with no connection to any internal structure.

A monostome is a worm with one sucker (oral). Flukes with an oral sucker and an acetabulum at the posterior end of the body are called Amphistomes. Distomes are flukes with an oral sucker and a ventral sucker, but the ventral sucker is somewhere other than posterior. These terms are common in older literature, when they were thought to reflect systematic relationships within the groups. They have fallen out of use in modern digenean taxonomy.

=== Reproductive system ===
The vast majority of digeneans are hermaphrodites. This is likely to be an adaptation to low abundance within hosts, allowing the life cycle to continue when only one individual successfully infects the final host. Fertilisation is internal, with sperm being transferred via the cirrus to the Laurer's Canal or genital aperture. A key group of digeneans which are dioecious are the schistosomes. Asexual reproduction in the first larval stage is ubiquitous.

While the sexual formation of the digenean eggs and asexual reproduction in the first larval stage (miracidium) is widely reported, the developmental biology of the asexual stages remains a problem. Electron microscopic studies have shown that the light microscopically visible germ balls consist of mitotically dividing cells which give rise to embryos and to a line of new germ cells that become included in these embryonic stages. Since the absence of meiotic processes is not proven, the exact definition remains doubtful.

==== Male organs ====
Protandry is the general rule among the Digenea. Usually two testes are present, but some flukes can have more than 100. Also present are vasa efferentia, a vas deferens, seminal vesicle, ejaculatory duct and a cirrus (analogous to a penis) usually (but not always) enclosed in a cirrus sac. The cirrus may or may not be covered in proteinaceous spines. The exact conformation of these organs within the male terminal genitalia is taxonomically important at the familial and generic levels.

==== Female organs ====
Usually there is a single ovary with an oviduct, a seminal receptacle, a pair of vitelline glands (involved in yolk and egg-shell production) with ducts, the ootype (a chamber where eggs are formed), a complex collection of glands cells called Mehlis’ gland, which is believed to lubricate the uterus for egg passage.

In addition, some digeneans possess a canal called Laurer's Canal, which leads from the oviduct to the dorsal surface of the body. The function of this canal is debated, but it may be used for insemination in some species or for disposal of waste products from reproduction in other species. Most trematodes possess an ovicapt, an enlarged portion of the oviduct where it joins the ovary. It probably controls the release of ova and spaces out their descent down the uterus.

The uterus typically opens into a common genital atrium that also received the distal male copulatory organ (cirrus) before immediately opening onto the outer surface of the worm. The distal part of the uterus may be expanded into a metraterm, set off from the proximal uterus by a muscular sphincter, or it may be lined with spines, as in the Monorchiidae and some other families.

=== Digestive system ===
As adults, most digeneans possess a terminal or subterminal mouth, a muscular pharynx that provides the force for ingesting food, and a forked, blind digestive system consisting of two tubular sacs called caeca (sing. caecum). In some species the two gut caeca join posteriorly to make a ring-shaped gut or cyclocoel. In others the caeca may fuse with the body wall posteriorly to make one or more anuses, or with the excretory vesicle to form a uroproct. Digeneans are also capable of direct nutrient uptake through the tegument by pinocytosis and phagocytosis by the syncitium. Most adult digeneans occur in the vertebrate alimentary canal or its associated organs, where they most often graze on contents of the lumen (e.g., food ingested by the host, bile, mucus), but they may also feed across the mucosal wall (e.g., submucosa, host blood). The blood flukes, such as schistosomes, spirorchiids and sanguinicolids, feed exclusively on blood. Asexual stages in mollusc intermediate hosts feed mostly by direct absorption, although the redia stage found in some groups does have a mouth, pharynx and simple gut and may actively consume host tissue or even other parasites. Encysted metacercarial stages and free-living cercarial stages do not feed.

=== Nervous system ===
Paired ganglia at the anterior end of the body serve as the brain. From this nerves extend anteriorly and posteriorly. Sensory receptors are, for the most part, lacking among the adults, although they do have tangoreceptor cells. Larval stages have many kinds of sensory receptors, including light receptors and chemoreceptors. Chemoreception plays an important role in the free-living miracidial larva recognising and locating its host.

== Life cycles ==
There is a bewildering array of variation on the complex digenean life cycle, and plasticity in this trait is probably a key to the group's success. In general, the life cycles may have two, three, or four obligate (necessary) hosts, sometimes with transport or paratenic hosts in between. The three-host life cycle is probably the most common. In almost all species, the first host in the life cycle is a mollusc. This has led to the inference that the ancestral digenean was a mollusc parasite and that vertebrate hosts were added subsequently.

The alternation of sexual and asexual generations is an important feature of digeneans. This phenomenon involves the presence of several discrete generations in one life-cycle.

A typical digenean trematode life cycle is as follows. Eggs leave the vertebrate host in faeces and use various strategies to infect the first intermediate host, in which sexual reproduction does not occur. Digeneans may infect the first intermediate host (usually a snail) by either passive or active means. The eggs of some digeneans, for example, are (passively) eaten by snails (or, rarely, by an annelid worm), in which they proceed to hatch. Alternatively, eggs may hatch in water to release an actively swimming, ciliated larva, the miracidium, which must locate and penetrate the body wall of the snail host.

After post-ingestion hatching or penetration of the snail, the miracidium metamorphoses into a simple, sac-like mother sporocyst. The mother sporocyst undergoes a round of internal asexual reproduction, giving rise to either rediae (sing. redia) or daughter sporocysts. The second generation is thus the daughter parthenita sequence. These in turn undergo further asexual reproduction, ultimately yielding large numbers of the second free-living stage, the cercaria (pl. cercariae).

Free-swimming cercariae leave the snail host and move through the aquatic or marine environment, often using a whip-like tail, though a tremendous diversity of tail morphology is seen. Cercariae are infective to the second host in the life cycle, and infection may occur passively (e.g., a fish consumes a cercaria) or actively (the cercaria penetrates the fish).

The life cycles of some digeneans include only two hosts, the second being a vertebrate. In these groups, sexual maturity occurs after the cercaria penetrates the second host, which is in this case also the definitive host. Two-host life cycles can be primary (there never was a third host) as in the Bivesiculidae, or secondary (there was at one time in evolutionary history a third host but it has been lost).

In three-host life cycles, cercariae develop in the second intermediate host into a resting stage, the metacercaria, which is usually encysted in a cyst of host and parasite origin, or encapsulated in a layer of tissue derived from the host only. This stage is infective to the definitive host. Transmission occurs when the definitive host preys upon an infected second intermediate host. Metacercariae excyst in the definitive host's gut in response to a variety of physical and chemical signals, such as gut pH levels, digestive enzymes, temperature, etc. Once excysted, adult digeneans migrate to more or less specific sites in the definitive host and the life cycle repeats.

== Evolution ==
The evolutionary origins of the Digenea have been debated for some time, but there appears general agreement that the proto-digenean was a parasite of a mollusc, possibly of the mantle cavity. Evidence for this comes from the ubiquity of molluscs as first intermediate hosts for digeneans, and the fact that most aspidogastreans (the sister group to the Digenea) also have mollusc associations. It is thought that the early trematodes (the collective name for digeneans and aspidogastreans) likely evolved from rhabdocoel turbellarians that colonised the open mantle cavity of early molluscs.

It is likely that more complex life cycles evolved through a process of terminal addition, whereby digeneans survived predation of their mollusc host, probably by a fish. Other hosts were added by the same process until the modern diversity of life cycle patterns developed.

=== Important families ===
Digenea includes about 80 families. They are listed below, organised by order.

Digenea

- Diplostomida
  - Suborder Diplostomata
    - Superfamily Brachylaimoidea Joyeux & Foley, 1930
      - Brachylaimidae Joyeux & Foley, 1930
      - Leucochloridiidae Poche, 1907
    - Superfamily Diplostomoidea Poirier, 1886
      - Brauninidae Wolf, 1903
      - Cyathocotylidae Mühling, 1898
      - Diplostomidae Poirier, 1886
      - Proterodiplostomidae Dubois, 1936
      - Strigeidae Railliet, 1919
    - Superfamily Schistosomatoidea Stiles & Hassall, 1898
      - Aporocotylidae Odhner, 1912
      - Schistosomatidae Stiles & Hassall, 1898
      - Spirorchiidae Stunkard, 1921
- Plagiorchiida
  - Apocreadiata
    - Apocreadioidea Skrjabin, 1942
      - Apocreadiidae Skrjabin, 1942
  - Bivesiculata
    - Bivesiculoidea
      - Bivesiculidae Yamaguti, 1934
  - Bucephalata
    - Bucephaloidea Poche, 1907
      - Bucephalidae Poche, 1907
      - Nuitrematidae Kurochkin, 1975
    - Gymnophalloidea Odhner, 1905
      - Botulisaccidae Yamaguti, 1971
      - Fellodistomidae Nicoll, 1909
      - Gymnophallidae Odhner, 1905
      - Tandanicolidae Johnston, 1927
  - Echinostomata
    - Echinostomatoidea Looss, 1902
      - Calycodidae Dollfus, 1929
      - Cyclocoelidae Stossich, 1902
      - Echinochasmidae Odhner, 1910
      - Echinostomatidae Looss, 1899
      - Eucotylidae Cohn, 1904
      - Fasciolidae Railliet, 1895
      - Himasthlidae Odhner, 1910
      - Philophthalmidae Looss, 1899
      - Psilostomidae Looss, 1900
      - Rhytidodidae Odhner, 1926
      - Typhlocoelidae Harrah, 1922
  - Haplosplanchnata
    - Haplosplanchnoidea Poche, 1925
      - Haplosplanchnidae Poche, 1926
  - Hemiurata
    - Azygioidea Lühe, 1909
      - Azygiidae Lühe, 1909
    - Hemiuroidea Looss, 1899
      - Accacoeliidae Odhner, 1911
      - Bathycotylidae Dollfus, 1932
      - Derogenidae Nicoll, 1910
      - Dictysarcidae Skrjabin & Guschanskaja, 1955
      - Didymozoidae Monticelli, 1888
      - Gonocercidae Skrjabin & Guschanskaja, 1955
      - Hemiuridae Looss, 1899
      - Hirudinellidae Dollfus, 1932
      - Isoparorchiidae Travassos, 1922
      - Lecithasteridae Odhner, 1905
      - Ptychogonimidae Dollfus, 1937
      - Sclerodistomidae Odhner, 1927
      - Sclerodistomoididae Gibson & Bray, 1979
      - Syncoeliidae Looss, 1899
  - Heronimata
    - Heronimoidea Ward, 1918
      - Heronimidae Ward, 1918
  - Lepocreadiata
    - Lepocreadioidea Odhner, 1905
      - Aephnidiogenidae Yamaguti, 1934
      - Deropristidae Cable & Hunninen, 1942
      - Enenteridae Yamaguti, 1958
      - Gorgocephalidae Manter, 1966
      - Gyliauchenidae Fukui, 1929
      - Lepidapedidae Yamaguti, 1958
      - Lepocreadiidae Odhner, 1905
      - Liliatrematidae Gubanov, 1953
  - Monorchiata
    - Monorchioidea Odhner, 1911
      - Lissorchiidae Magath, 1917
      - Monorchiidae Odhner, 1911
  - Opisthorchiata
    - Opisthorchioidea Braun, 1901
      - Cryptogonimidae Ward, 1917
      - Heterophyidae Leiper, 1909
      - Opisthorchiidae Looss, 1899
  - Pronocephalata
    - Paramphistomoidea Fischoeder, 1901
      - Cladorchiidae Fischoeder, 1901
      - Mesometridae Poche, 1926
      - Microscaphidiidae Looss, 1900
      - Paramphistomidae Fischoeder, 1901
    - Pronocephaloidea Looss, 1899
      - Labicolidae Blair, 1979
      - Notocotylidae Lühe, 1909
      - Nudacotylidae Barker, 1916
      - Opisthotrematidae Poche, 1926
      - Pronocephalidae Looss, 1899
      - Rhabdiopoeidae Poche, 1926
  - Transversotremata
    - Transversotrematoidea Witenberg, 1944
      - Transversotrematidae Witenberg, 1944
  - Xiphidiata
    - Allocreadioidea Looss, 1902
      - Acanthocolpidae Lühe, 1906
      - Allocreadiidae Looss, 1902
      - Batrachotrematidae Dollfus & Williams, 1966
      - Brachycladiidae Odhner, 1905
      - Opecoelidae Ozaki, 1925
    - Gorgoderoidea Looss, 1901
      - Callodistomidae Odhner, 1910
      - Dicrocoeliidae Looss, 1899
      - Gorgoderidae Looss, 1899
    - Haploporoidea Nicoll, 1914
      - Atractotrematidae Yamaguti, 1939
      - Haploporidae Nicoll, 1914
    - Microphalloidea Ward, 1901
      - Diplangidae Yamaguti, 1971
      - Exotidendriidae Mehra, 1935
      - Faustulidae Poche, 1926
      - Microphallidae Ward, 1901
      - Pachypsolidae Yamaguti, 1958
      - Phaneropsolidae Mehra, 1935
      - Pleurogenidae Looss, 1899
      - Prosthogonimidae Lühe, 1909
      - Renicolidae Dollfus, 1939
      - Zoogonidae Odhner, 1902
    - Plagiorchioidea Lühe, 1901
      - Auridistomidae Lühe, 1901
      - Brachycoeliidae Looss, 1899
      - Cephalogonimidae Looss, 1899
      - Choanocotylidae Jue Sue & Platt, 1998
      - Echinoporidae Krasnolobova & Timofeeva, 1965
      - Encyclometridae Mehra, 1931
      - Leptophallidae Dayal, 1938
      - Macroderoididae McMullen, 1937
      - Meristocotylidae Fischthal & Kuntz, 1981
      - Ocadiatrematidae Fischthal & Kuntz, 1981
      - Orientocreadiidae Yamaguti, 1958
      - Plagiorchiidae Lühe, 1901
      - Styphlotrematidae Baer, 1924
      - Telorchiidae Looss, 1899
      - Thrinascotrematidae Jue Sue & Platt, 1999
      - Urotrematidae Poche, 1926

== Human digenean infections ==
Only about 12 of the 6,000 known species are infectious to humans, but some of these species are important diseases afflicting over 200 million people. The species that infect humans can be divided into groups, the schistosomes and the non-schistosomes.

=== Schistosomes ===
The Schistosomes occur in the circulatory system of the definitive host. Humans become infected after free-swimming cercaria liberated from infected snails penetrate the skin. These dioecious worms are long and thin, ranging in size from 10 to 30 mm in length to 0.2 to 1.0 mm in diameter. Adult males are shorter and thicker than females, and have a long groove along one side of the body in which the female is clasped. Females reach sexual maturity after they have been united with a male. After mating the two remain locked together for the rest of their lives. They can live for several years and produce many thousands of eggs.

The four species of schistosomes that infect humans are members of the genus Schistosoma.

Human Schistosomes
| Scientific Name | First Intermediate Host | Endemic Area |
|---|---|---|
| Schistosoma mansoni | Biomphalaria spp. | Africa, South America, Caribbean, Middle East |
| Schistosoma haematobium | Bulinus spp. | Africa, Middle East |
| Schistosoma japonicum | Oncomelania spp. | China, East Asia, Philippines |
| Schistosoma intercalatum | Bulinus spp. | Africa |

=== Non-schistosomes ===
The seven major species of non-schistosomes that infect humans are listed below. People become infected after ingesting metacercarial cysts on plants or in undercooked animal flesh. Most species inhabit the human gastrointestinal tract, where they shed eggs along with host feces. Paragonimus westermani, which colonizes the lungs, can also pass its eggs in saliva. These flukes generally cause mild pathology in humans, but more serious effects may also occur.

Human non-Schistosomes
| Scientific Name | First Intermediate Host | Mode of Human Infection | Endemic Area |
|---|---|---|---|
| Fasciolopsis buski | Segmentina sp. | Plants | Asia, India |
| Heterophyes heterophyes | Pirinella | Mullet, Tilapia | Asia, Eastern Europe, Egypt, Middle East |
| Metagonimus yokogawaii | Semisulcospira sp. | Carp, Trout | Siberia |
| Gastrodiscoides hominis | Helicorbis sp. | Plants | India, Vietnam, Philippines |
| Clonorchis sinensis | Bulinus sp. | Fish | East Asia, North America |
| Fasciola hepatica | Galba truncatula | Plants | Worldwide |
| Paragonimus westermani | Oncomelania sp. | Crabs, crayfish | Asia |

== Notes ==
- Gibson, D.I., Jones, A. & Bray, R.A. (2002). Key to the Trematoda, vol.1 ISBN 0-85199-547-0
- Littlewood D.T.J. & Bray R.A. (2001) Interrelationships of the Platyhelminthes. ISBN 0-7484-0903-3
- Yamaguti, S. (1971). Synopsis of digenetic trematodes of vertebrates. Keigaku Publishing Co., Tokyo.
