= Azygiida =

Scientific classification
- Kingdom: Animalia
- Phylum: Platyhelminthes
- Class: Trematoda
- Subclass: Digenea
- Order: Azygiida

Order of flatworms

Azygiida is an order of flatworms belonging to the class Rhabditophora.

Families:

- Accacoeliidae Odhner, 1911
- Aerobiotrematidae
- Albulatrematidae
- Aphanhysteridae
- Aerobiotrematidae
- Arnolidae
- Azygiidae Lühe, 1909
- Bathycotylidae Dollfus, 1932
- Bivesiculidae Yamaguti, 1934
- Botulidae
- Bunocotylidae
- Cylindrorchiidae
- Dictysarcidae Skrjabin & Guschanskaja, 1955
- Didymozoidae Monticelli, 1888
- Halipegidae
- Hemiuridae Looss, 1899
- Hirudinellidae Dollfus, 1932
- Isoparorchiidae Travassos, 1922
- Lobatovitelliovariidae
- Mabiaramidae
- Oesophagicolidae
- Pelorohelminthidae
- Ptychogonimidae Dollfus, 1937
- Sclerodistomatidae
- Sclerodistomidae Odhner, 1927
- Syncoeliidae Looss, 1899
- Tetrasteridae
