= Batrachotrematidae =

Scientific classification
- Kingdom: Animalia
- Phylum: Platyhelminthes
- Class: Trematoda
- Order: Plagiorchiida
- Suborder: Xiphidiata
- Superfamily: Opecoelioidea
- Family: Batrachotrematidae; Dollfus & Williams, 1966

Family of flukes

Batrachotrematidae is a family of trematodes in the order Plagiorchiida.

== Genera ==
The following genera are described severally, and by Rizvi, et al. (2012):

- Batrachotrema Dollfus & Williams, 1966
- Opisthioparorchis Wang, 1980

The following additional genera are described by Cribb (2005), but are not discussed in Rizvi, et al. (2012) or other studies:

- Gigantodiscum Wang, 1980
- Rhacophotrema Uchida, Itagaki & Inoue, 1980

Cribb (2005) noted that most species of Batrachotrematidae are poorly described, and many seem to be different from the type-species of the genera to which they belong. A lack of molecular studies prevent adequate classification of the species; Cribb (2005) describes the split between African and Asian species, which parasitise different types of frogs, as possibly warranting a separate distinction at the family level. The lack of clarity regarding the definition of the family, and the lack of molecular and life-cycle studies on the putative species, makes Batrachotrematidae one of the worst-defined digenean families.
