= Rhopalias =

Scientific classification
- Kingdom: Animalia
- Phylum: Platyhelminthes
- Class: Trematoda
- Order: Plagiorchiida
- Suborder: Echinostomata
- Family: Rhopaliidae; Looss, 1899
- Genus: Rhopalias; Stiles & Hassall, 1898

Genus of flukes

Rhopalias is a genus of trematodes belonging to the monotypic family Rhopaliidae.

The species of this genus are found in America.

Species:

- Rhopalias coronatus
- Rhopalias macracanthus
- Rhopalias oochi López-Caballero, Mata-López & Pérez-Ponce de León, 2019
