= Opisthioparorchis =

Scientific classification
- Kingdom: Animalia
- Phylum: Platyhelminthes
- Class: Trematoda
- Order: Plagiorchiida
- Family: Batrachotrematidae
- Genus: Opisthioparorchis; Wang, 1980

Genus of flukes

Opisthioparorchis is a genus of trematodes in the family Batrachotrematidae. The separation of Opisthioparorchis and Batrachotrema, originally weakened by the heterogeneity of the former, has been solidified by the separation of species presenting tegumental spines to Opisthioparorchis and those without tegumental spines to Batrachotrema. This differentiation is opposed to that of Wang (1980), who separated Opisthioparorchis on the basis of the relative positioning of the testes and their relation to the internal caeca.

== Species ==
- Opisthioparorchis boheaensis Wang, 1980
- Opisthioparorchis boulengeris Li, 1997
- Opisthioparorchis dehradunensis Rizvi, Bursey & Bhutia, 2012
- Opisthioparorchis indica Tandon, Imkongwapang & Prasad, 2005
- Opisthioparorchis megaloonos Liang, Ke & Pang, 1990
- Opisthioparorchis meixianensis Liang, Ke & Pang, 1990
- Opisthioparorchis nanoranae Rizvi, Bursey & Bhutia, 2012
- Opisthioparorchis pleurogenitus Wang, 1980
- Opisthioparorchis ranae Wang, 1980
- Opisthioparorchis vietnamensis (Moravec & Sey, 1989) Rizvi, Bursey & Bhutia, 2012
- Opisthioparorchis yaanensis (Zhang & Sha, 1985) Cribb, 2005
- Opisthioparorchis yunnanse Li, 1996
