= Balfouriidae =

Scientific classification
- Kingdom: Animalia
- Phylum: Platyhelminthes
- Class: Trematoda
- Order: Plagiorchiida
- Suborder: Echinostomata
- Family: Balfouriidae

Family of flatworms

Balfouriidae is a family of flatworms belonging to the order Plagiorchiida. The family consists of only one genus: Balfouria Leiper, 1911.
