= Troglotrematidae =

Scientific classification
- Kingdom: Animalia
- Phylum: Platyhelminthes
- Class: Trematoda
- Order: Plagiorchiida
- Suborder: Xiphidiata
- Superfamily: Troglotrematoidea
- Family: Troglotrematidae; Odhner, 1914

Family of flatworms

Troglotrematidae is a family of trematodes belonging to the order Plagiorchiida.

Genera:

- Beaveria Lee, 1965
- Macroorchis Goto, 1919
- Nanophyetus Chapin, 1927
- Nephrotrema Baer, 1931
- Pseudotroglotrema Yamaguti, 1971
- Sellacotyle Wallace, 1935
- Skrjabinophyetus Dimitrova & Genov, 1967
- Troglotrema Odhner, 1914
- Xiphidiotrema Senger, 1953
