= Cymatocarpus =

Cymatocarpus may refer to:

- Cymatocarpus (flatworm), a genus of flatworms in the family Brachycoeliidae
- Cymatocarpus (plant), a genus of flowering plants in the family Brassicaceae
