= Azygia =

Scientific classification
- Kingdom: Animalia
- Phylum: Platyhelminthes
- Class: Trematoda
- Order: Plagiorchiida
- Family: Azygiidae
- Genus: Azygia; Looss, 1899

Genus of worms

Azygia is a genus of flatworms belonging to the family Azygiidae.

The species of this genus are found in Europe, Southeastern Asia and Northern America.

Species:

- Azygia acuminata Goldberger, 1911
- Azygia anguillae Ozaki, 1924
- Azygia angusticauda (Stafford, 1904) Manter, 1926
- Azygia aphredoderi Barger, 2014
- Azygia armati Tiwari, 1959
- Azygia asiatica Simha & Pershad, 1964
- Azygia cyprinus Wang
- Azygia gotoi (Ariake, 1922) Ozaki, 1924
- Azygia hwangtsiyui Tsin, 1933
- Azygia hwangtsiyusi Tsin & Tsin, 1933
- Azygia indicusi Lokhande, 1991
- Azygia longa (Leidy, 1851) Manter, 1926
- Azygia lucii (Müller, 1776) Lühe, 1909
- Azygia marulii Jaiswal & Narayan, 1971
- Azygia micropteri (MacCallum, 1921) Skrjabin & Guschanskaja, 1958
- Azygia mirabilis (Braun, 1891) Odening, 1978
- Azygia papillata Ubgade & Agarwal, 1979
- Azygia parasiluri Wang, 1983
- Azygia perryi Fujita, 1918
- Azygia pristipomai Tubangui, 1928
- Azygia rhinogobii Shimazu, 2007
- Azygia robusta Odhner, 1911
- Azygia sangangensis Wang, 1981
- Azygia sinipercae Wang & Pang, 1973
- Azygia stunkardi Rai, 1962
- Azygia tereticollis (Müller, 1776) Lühe, 1909
