= Callodistomidae =

Scientific classification
- Kingdom: Animalia
- Phylum: Platyhelminthes
- Class: Trematoda
- Order: Plagiorchiida
- Suborder: Xiphidiata
- Superfamily: Gorgoderoidea
- Family: Callodistomidae; Odhner, 1910

Family of flukes

Callodistomidae is a family of trematodes belonging to the order Plagiorchiida.

Genera:

- Callodistomum Odhner, 1902
- Cholepotes Odhner, 1910
- Guptatrema Yamaguti, 1971
- Prosthenhystera Travassos, 1922
- Teratotrema Travassos, Artigas & Pereira, 1928
