= Leptophallidae =

Scientific classification
- Kingdom: Animalia
- Phylum: Platyhelminthes
- Class: Trematoda
- Order: Plagiorchiida
- Suborder: Xiphidiata
- Superfamily: Plagiorchioidea
- Family: Leptophallidae; Dayal, 1938

Family of flukes

Leptophallidae is a family of trematodes belonging to the order Plagiorchiida.

Genera:

- Paralepoderma Dollfus, 1950
