= Spiritestis =

Scientific classification
- Kingdom: Animalia
- Phylum: Platyhelminthes
- Class: Trematoda
- Order: Plagiorchiida
- Family: Haploporidae
- Subfamily: Waretrematinae
- Genus: Spiritestis; Nagaty, 1948

Genus of flukes

Spiritestis is a genus of trematodes in the family Haploporidae.

== Species ==
- Spiritests arabii Nagaty, 1948
- Spiritestis herveyensis Pulis & Overstreet, 2013
- Spiritestis machidai Pulis & Overstreet, 2013
