= Batrachotrema =

Scientific classification
- Kingdom: Animalia
- Phylum: Platyhelminthes
- Class: Trematoda
- Order: Plagiorchiida
- Family: Batrachotrematidae
- Genus: Batrachotrema; Dollfus & Williams, 1966

Genus of flukes

Batrachotrema is a genus of trematodes in the family Batrachotrematidae. It is the type-genus of the family, and its type-species is B. petropedatis. The type-species is the only species of the family found in Africa, (as opposed to south-eastern Asia,) and this distinction has led Cribb (2005) to consider that a family-level distinction may be needed between B. petropedatis and other species of Batrachotrematidae; however, molecular testing will be needed to decide this point. Batrachotrema also contains B. pseudobagri, the only species of Batrachotrematidae which is parasitic in a fish, rather than in frogs.

== Species ==
- Batrachotrema korbaensis Rizvi, Bursey & Bhutia, 2012
- Batrachotrema nagalandensis Tandon, Imkongwapang & Prasad, 2005
- Batrachotrema opistosacca Liang & Ke, 1998
- Batrachotrema petropedatis Dollfus & Williams, 1966
- Batrachotrema pseudobagri Wang, 1981
