= Haploporus =

Haploporus may refer to:

- Haploporus (flatworm), a flatworm genus in the family Haploporidae
- Haploporus (fungus), a fungus genus in the family Polyporaceae
