= Polyangium (flatworm) =

Scientific classification
- Kingdom: Animalia
- Phylum: Platyhelminthes
- Class: Trematoda
- Order: Plagiorchiida
- Family: Microscaphidiidae
- Genus: Polyangium; Looss, 1902

Genus of flatworms

Polyangium is a genus of flatworms belonging to the family Microscaphidiidae.

The species of this genus are found in Australia.

Species:

- Polyangium linguatula (Looss, 1899)
- Polyangium manueli Eduardo & Diaz, 2008
