= Brachycladiidae =

Scientific classification
- Kingdom: Animalia
- Phylum: Platyhelminthes
- Class: Trematoda
- Order: Plagiorchiida
- Suborder: Xiphidiata
- Superfamily: Brachycladioidea
- Family: Brachycladiidae; Odhner, 1905

Family of flukes

Brachycladiidae is a family of trematodes belonging to the order Plagiorchiida.

Genera:

- Balanorchis Fischoeder, 1901
- Brachycladium Looss, 1899
- Campula Cobbold, 1858
- Cetitrema A.S.Skrjabin, 1970
- Hunterotrema Mclntosh, 1960
- Nasitrema Ozaki, 1935
- Odhneriella Skrjabin, 1915
- Orthosplanchnus Odhner, 1905
- Oschmarinella Skrjabin, 1947
- Synthesium Stunkard & Alvey, 1930
- Zalophotrema Stunkard & Alvey, 1929
