= Xiha =

Scientific classification
- Kingdom: Animalia
- Phylum: Platyhelminthes
- Class: Trematoda
- Order: Plagiorchiida
- Family: Haploporidae
- Subfamily: Forticulcitinae
- Genus: Xiha; Andres, Curran, Fayton, Pulis & Overstreet, 2015

Genus of flukes

Xiha is a genus of trematodes in the family Haploporidae.

== Species ==
- Xiha fastigata (Thatcher & Sparks, 1958) Andres, Curran, Fayton, Pulis & Overstreet, 2015
- Xiha fragilis (Fernández Bargiela, 1987) Andres, Curran, Fayton, Pulis & Overstreet, 2015
