= Polyangium =

Polyangium may refer to:

- Polyangium (flatworm), a genus of flatworms in the family Microscaphidiidae
- Polyangium (bacterium), a genus of bacteria in the family Polyangiaceae
