= Collyriclidae =

Scientific classification
- Kingdom: Animalia
- Phylum: Platyhelminthes
- Class: Trematoda
- Order: Plagiorchiida
- Suborder: Xiphidiata
- Superfamily: Gorgoderoidea
- Family: Collyriclidae; Ward, 1917

Family of flatworms

Collyriclidae is a family of flatworms belonging to the order Plagiorchiida.

Genera:

- Collyricium Kossack, 1911
- Collyricloides Vaucher, 1969
- Collyriclum Ward, 1917
