= Renicolidae =

Scientific classification
- Kingdom: Animalia
- Phylum: Platyhelminthes
- Class: Trematoda
- Order: Plagiorchiida
- Suborder: Xiphidiata
- Superfamily: Microphalloidea
- Family: Renicolidae; Dollfus, 1939

Family of flukes

Renicolidae is a family of trematodes belonging to the order Plagiorchiida.

Genera:

- Nephromonorcha Leonov, 1958
- Renicola Cohn, 1904
