= Eucotylidae =

Scientific classification
- Kingdom: Animalia
- Phylum: Platyhelminthes
- Class: Trematoda
- Order: Plagiorchiida
- Suborder: Xiphidiata
- Superfamily: Microphalloidea
- Family: Eucotylidae; Skrjabin, 1924

Family of flukes

Eucotylidae is a family of trematodes belonging to the order Plagiorchiida.

Genera:

- Eucotyle Cohn, 1904
- Neoeucotyle Kanev, Radev & Fried, 2002
- Paratanaisia Teixeira de Freitas, 1959
- Tamerlania Skrjabin, 1924
- Tanaisia Skrjabin, 1924
