= Lecithocladium =

Scientific classification
- Kingdom: Animalia
- Phylum: Platyhelminthes
- Class: Trematoda
- Order: Plagiorchiida
- Family: Hemiuridae
- Genus: Lecithocladium; Lühe, 1901

Genus of flatworms

Lecithocladium is a genus which belongs to the phylum Platyhelminthes and class Trematoda. The type species of this genus is Lecithocladium excisum. The main host for the adult of L. excisum in the North Sea is Scomber scombrus; but it also occurs in S. japonicus and there are also records in the literature from a wide range of other fishes such as Carangidae.
