= Capitimitta =

Scientific classification
- Kingdom: Animalia
- Phylum: Platyhelminthes
- Class: Trematoda
- Order: Plagiorchiida
- Family: Haploporidae
- Subfamily: Waretrematinae
- Genus: Capitimitta; Pulis & Overstreet, 2013

Genus of flukes

Capitimitta is a genus of trematodes in the family Haploporidae.

== Species ==
- Capitimitta costata Pulis & Overstreet, 2013
- Capitimitta darwinensis Pulis & Overstreet, 2013
