= Zalophotrema =

Scientific classification
- Kingdom: Animalia
- Phylum: Platyhelminthes
- Class: Trematoda
- Order: Plagiorchiida
- Family: Brachycladiidae
- Genus: Zalophotrema; Stunkard & Alvey, 1929

Genus of flatworms

Zalophotrema is a genus of flatworms belonging to the family Brachycladiidae.

The species of this genus are found in Northern America.

Species:

- Zalophotrema curilensis Gubanov, 1955
- Zalophotrema hepaticum Stunkard & Alvey, 1929
- Zalophotrema lubimowi Petrov & Tchertkova, 1969
