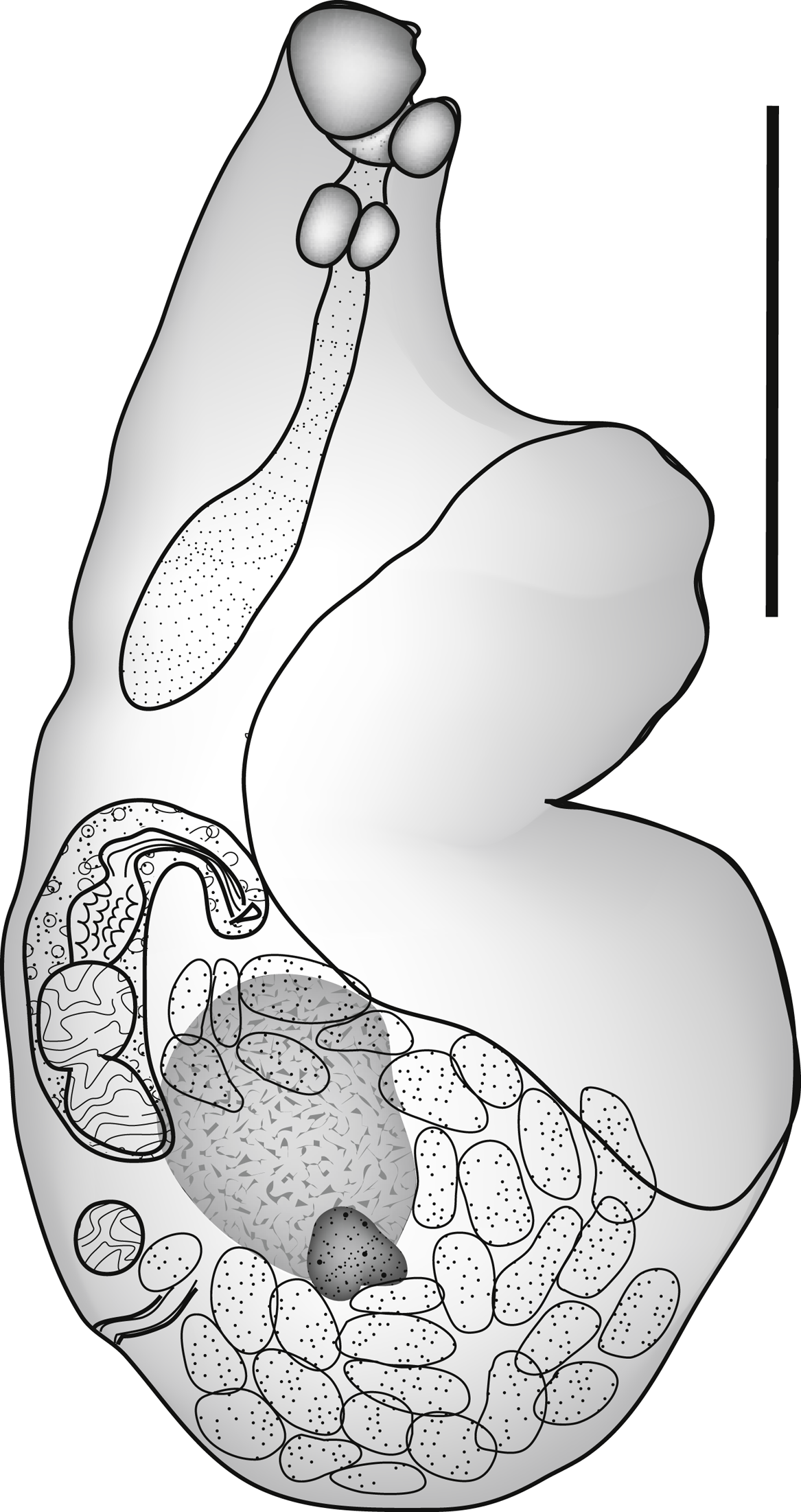
- Parvipyrum acanthuri Pritchard, 1963

Scientific classification
- Kingdom: Animalia
- Phylum: Platyhelminthes
- Class: Trematoda
- Order: Plagiorchiida
- Suborder: Xiphidiata
- Superfamily: Microphalloidea
- Family: Zoogonidae; Odhner, 1902

Genera
- See text

Synonyms
- Steganodermatidae Yamaguti, 1934

= Zoogonidae =

Family of flukes

Zoogonidae are a family of trematodes in the order Plagiorchiida.

Selected genera are:

- Brevicreadium
- Deretrema Linton, 1910
- Diphtherostomum Stossich, 1904
- Glaucivermis Overstreet, 1971
- Limnoderetrema Bray, 1987
- Neozoogonus Arai, 1954
- Parvipyrum
- Oesophagotrema Chaari, Derbel & Neifar, 2011
- Proparvipyrum
- Pseudochetosoma
- Pseudozoogonoides
- Steganoderma Stafford, 1904
- Zoogonoides Odhner, 1902
- Zoogonus Looss, 1901

== Gallery of zoogonids ==
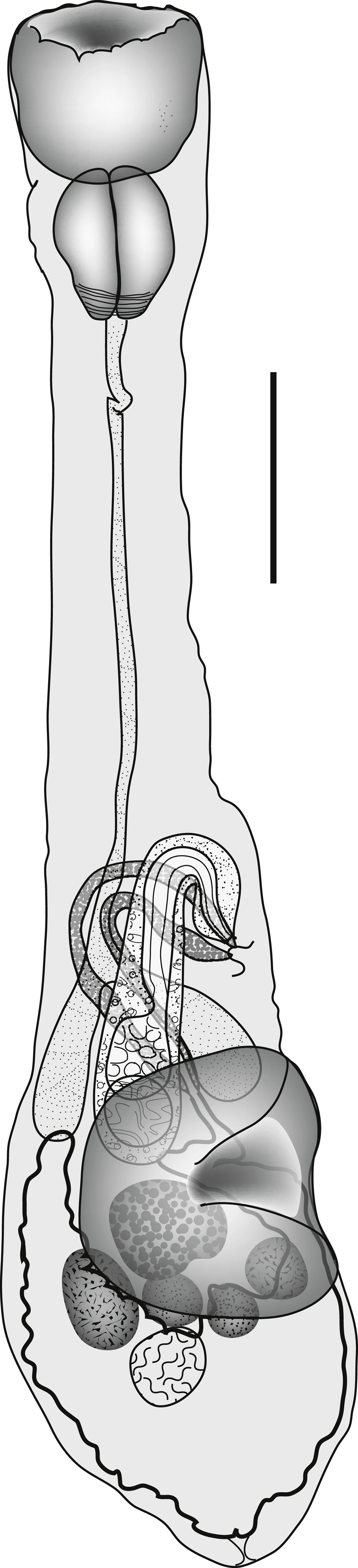
Diphterostomum plectorhynchi Machida, Kamegai & Kuramochi 2006

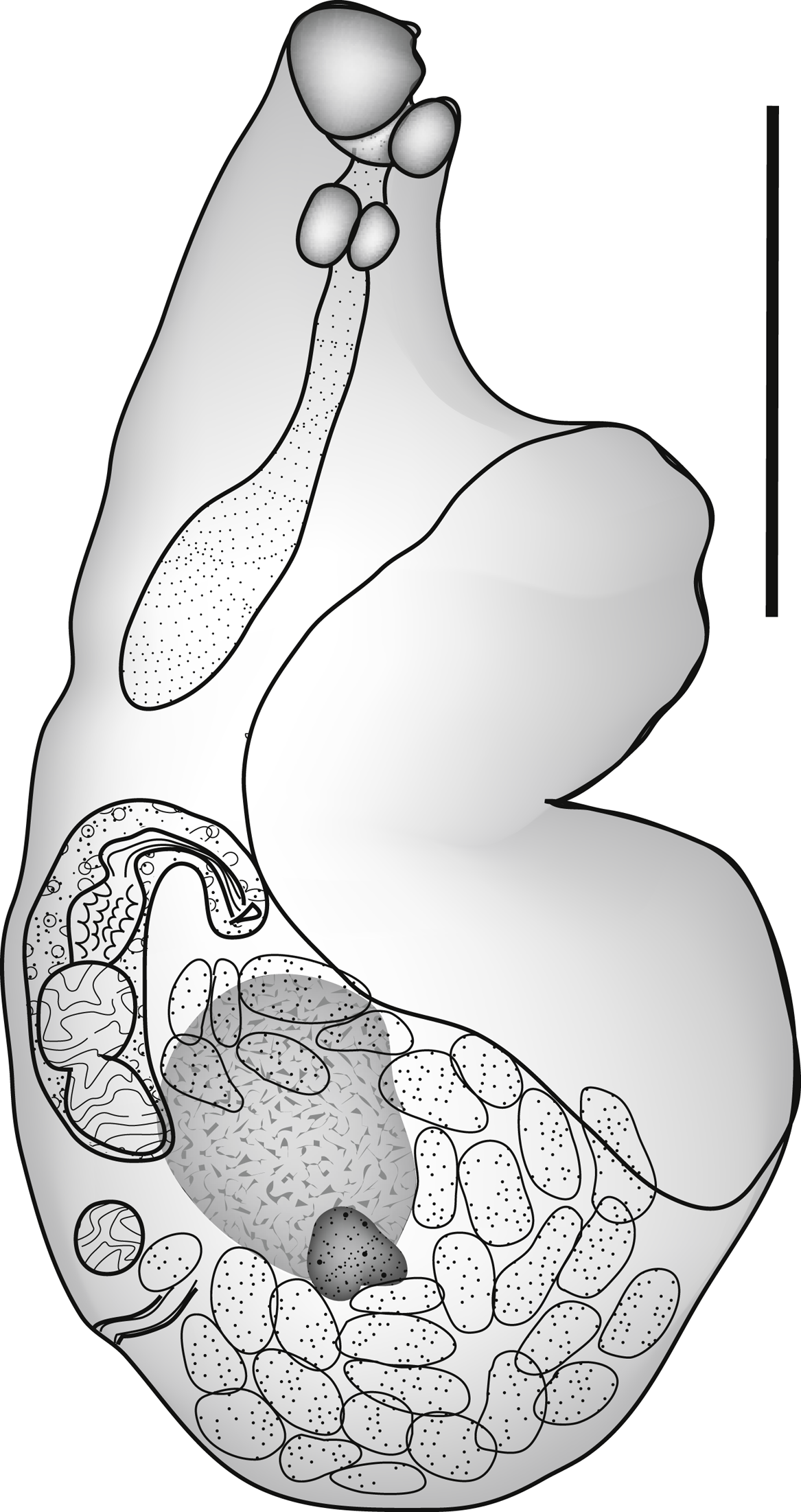
Parvipyrum acanthuri Pritchard, 1963

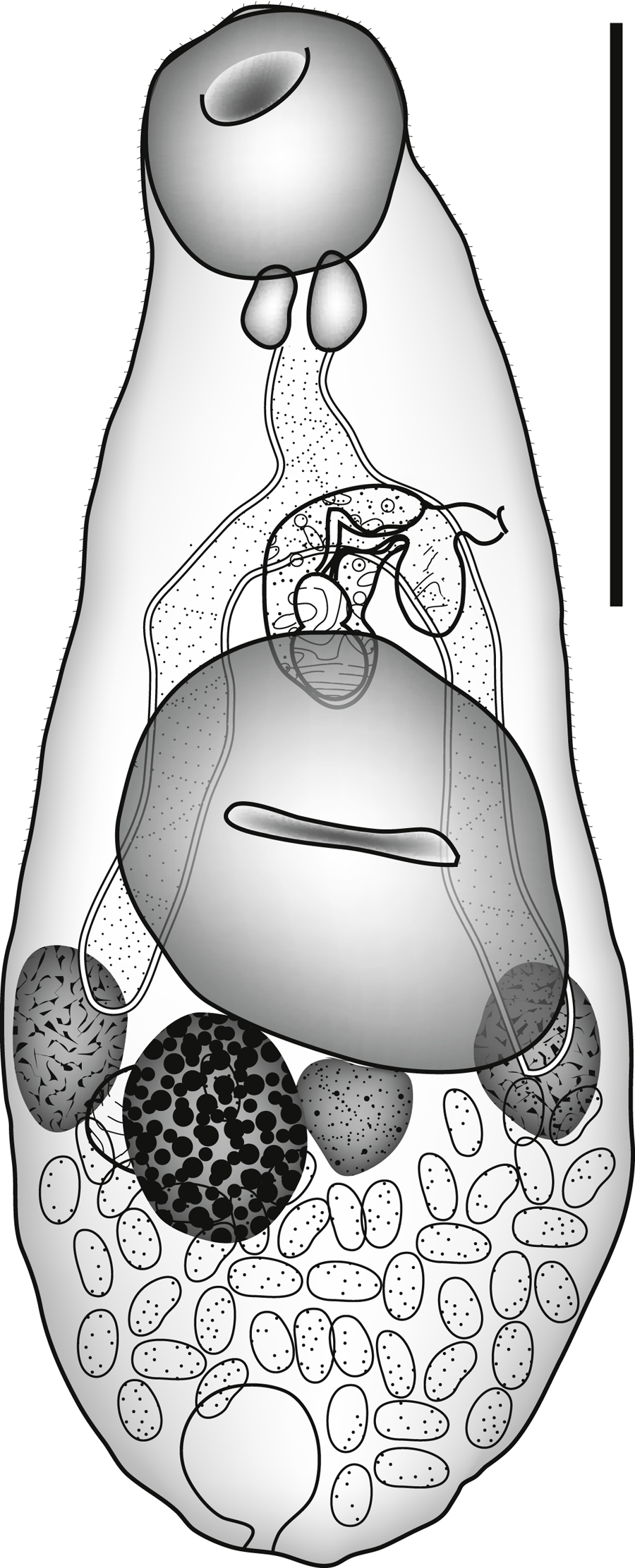
Zoogonoides viviparus (Olsson, 1868)

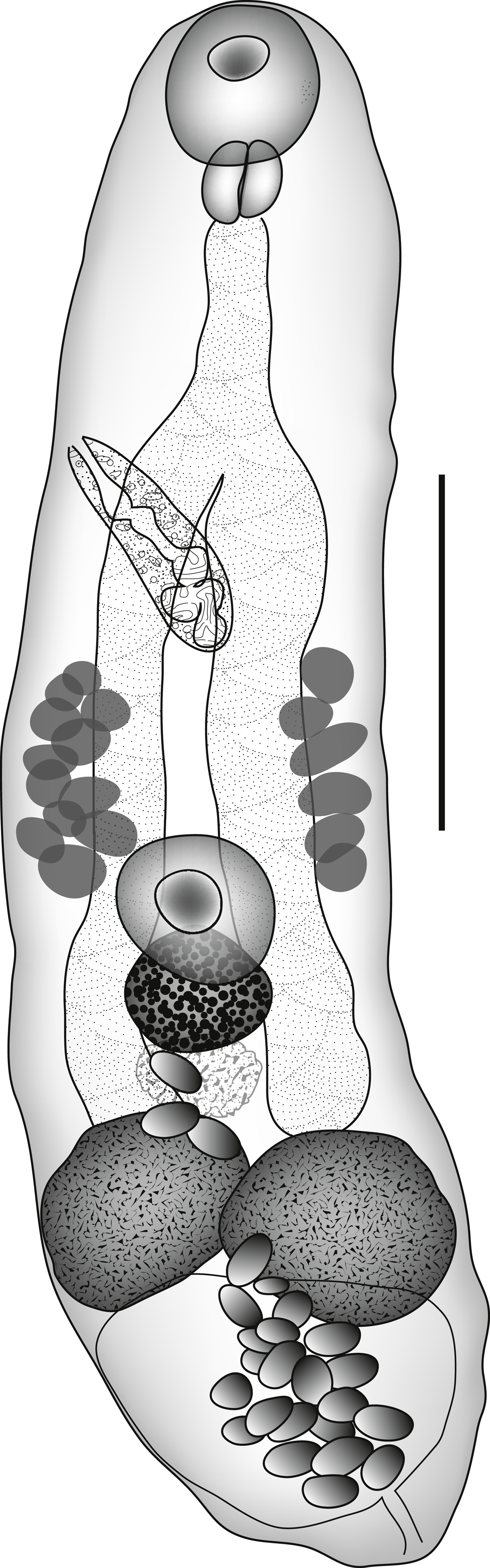
Deretrema ? combesorum Bray & Justine, 2008

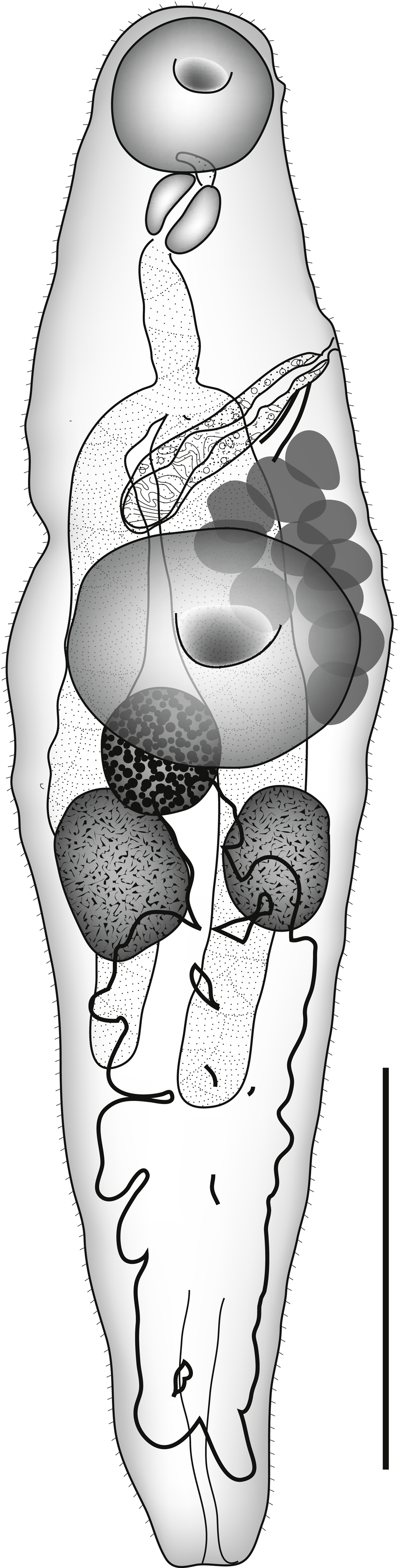
Deretrema? acutum Pritchard, 1963

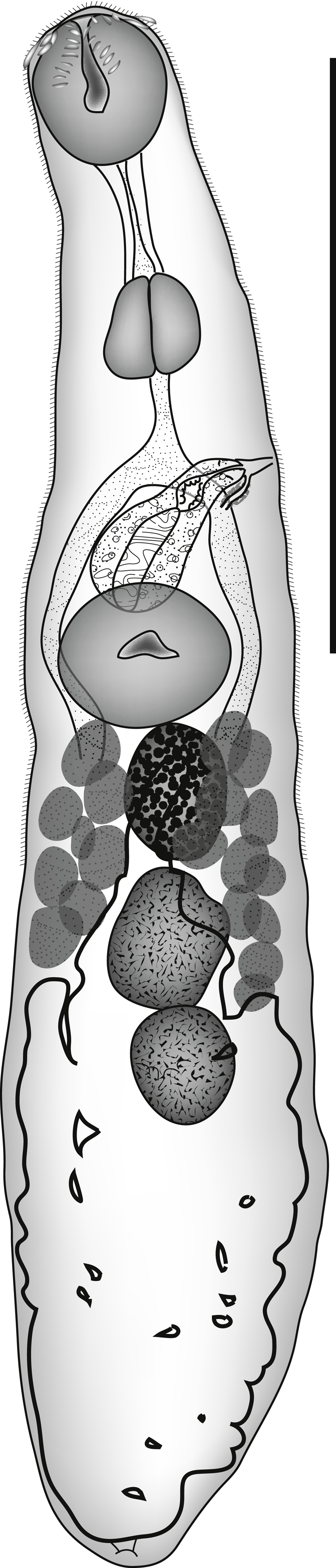
Overstreetia cribbi Bray & Justine, 2014
