= Renicola =

Scientific classification
- Kingdom: Animalia
- Phylum: Platyhelminthes
- Class: Trematoda
- Order: Plagiorchiida
- Family: Renicolidae
- Genus: Renicola; Cohn, 1904

Genus of flatworms

Renicola is a genus of flatworms belonging to the family Renicolidae.

The genus has almost cosmopolitan distribution.

Species:

- Renicola aegyptiacus Mahdy, 1993
- Renicola ardeolae Khalifa & El-Naffar, 1975
- Renicola brantae McIntosh & Farr, 1952
- Renicola bretensis Timon-David, 1953
- Renicola brevipyga Oshmarin, 1963
- Renicola brevivitellata Leonov & Belogurov, 1963
- Renicola buchanani (Martin & Gregory, 1951)
- Renicola caudescens Ching, 1989
- Renicola cerithidicola Martin, 1971
- Renicola cruzi Wright, 1954
- Renicola dollfusi Odening, 1962
- Renicola fischeri Odening, 1962
- Renicola foliata Ching, 1989
- Renicola fulmari Gubanov, 1970
- Renicola glacialis Riley & Owen, 1972
- Renicola glandoloba Witenburg, 1929
- Renicola glandoloboides Byrd & Heard, 1970
- Renicola goliath Wright, 1957
- Renicola heroni Mahdy, 1993
- Renicola indicola Odening, 1962
- Renicola keimahuri Yamaguti, 1939
- Renicola lari Timon-David, 1933
- Renicola macedoniense (Nezlobinski, 1926) Yamaguti, 1958
- Renicola macedoniensis (Nezlobinsky, 1926)
- Renicola mediovitellata Bychovskaja-Pavlovskaja, 1950
- Renicola mirandaribeiroi Teixeira de Freitas, 1955
- Renicola mollissima Kulachkova, 1957
- Renicola murmanica Belopolskaja, 1952
- Renicola nana Bychovskaja-Pavlovskaja, 1953
- Renicola ovocallosa Reimer, 1971
- Renicola pandioni Sudarikov, 1947
- Renicola paraquinta Rajewsky, 1937
- Renicola pelecani Wright, 1954
- Renicola philippinensis Stunkard, Nigrelli & Gandal, 1958
- Renicola pinguis (Mehlis, 1846) Cohn, 1904
- Renicola pollaris Kontrimavichus & Bakhmet'eva, 1960
- Renicola pseudosloanei Odening, 1962
- Renicola quinta Sokolova-Andronova, 1937
- Renicola rombipharyx Oshmarin, 1963
- Renicola roscovitus (Stunkard, 1932) Werding, 1969
- Renicola secunda Skrjabin, 1924
- Renicola sloanei Wright, 1954
- Renicola somateriae Belopolskaja, 1952
- Renicola sudaricovi Leonov, 1958
- Renicola sudarikovi Leonov, 1958
- Renicola tertia Skrjabin, 1924
- Renicola thaidus Stunkard, 1964
- Renicola thapari Caballero, 1953
- Renicola umigarasu Yamaguti, 1939
- Renicola undecima Sudarikov, 1947
- Renicola ussuriensis Oshmarin, 1963
- Renicola vietnamensis Odening, 1962
- Renicola vladika Oshmarin, 1950
- Renicola williamsi Munyer & Holloway, 1990
- Renicola wrighti Odening, 1962
