= Tandanicolidae =

Scientific classification
- Kingdom: Animalia
- Phylum: Platyhelminthes
- Class: Trematoda
- Order: Plagiorchiida
- Suborder: Gymnophallata
- Superfamily: Gymnophalloidea
- Family: Tandanicolidae; Johnston, 1927

Family of flukes

Tandanicolidae is a family of trematodes belonging to the order Plagiorchiida.

Genera:

- Buckleytrema Gupta, 1956
- Monodhelmis Dollfus, 1937
- Prosogonarium Yamaguti, 1952
- Tandanicola Johnston, 1927
