= Sclerodistomidae =

Scientific classification
- Kingdom: Animalia
- Phylum: Platyhelminthes
- Class: Trematoda
- Order: Plagiorchiida
- Suborder: Hemiurata
- Superfamily: Hemiuroidea
- Family: Sclerodistomidae; Odhner, 1927

Synonyms
- Mabiaramidae

Family of flukes

Sclerodistomidae is a family of trematodes belonging to the order Plagiorchiida.

Genera:

- Eurycoelum Brock, 1886
- Kenmackenzia Gibson, 1983
- Prosogonotrema Vigueras, 1940
- Prosorchiopsis Dollfus, 1947
- Prosorchis Yamaguti, 1934
- Sclerodistomum Looss, 1912
