= Echinoporidae =

Scientific classification
- Kingdom: Animalia
- Phylum: Platyhelminthes
- Class: Trematoda
- Order: Plagiorchiida
- Suborder: Xiphidiata
- Superfamily: Plagiorchioidea
- Family: Echinoporidae; Krasnolobova & Timofeeva, 1965

Family of flukes

Echinoporidae is a family of trematodes belonging to the order Plagiorchiida.

Genera:

- Echinoporus
