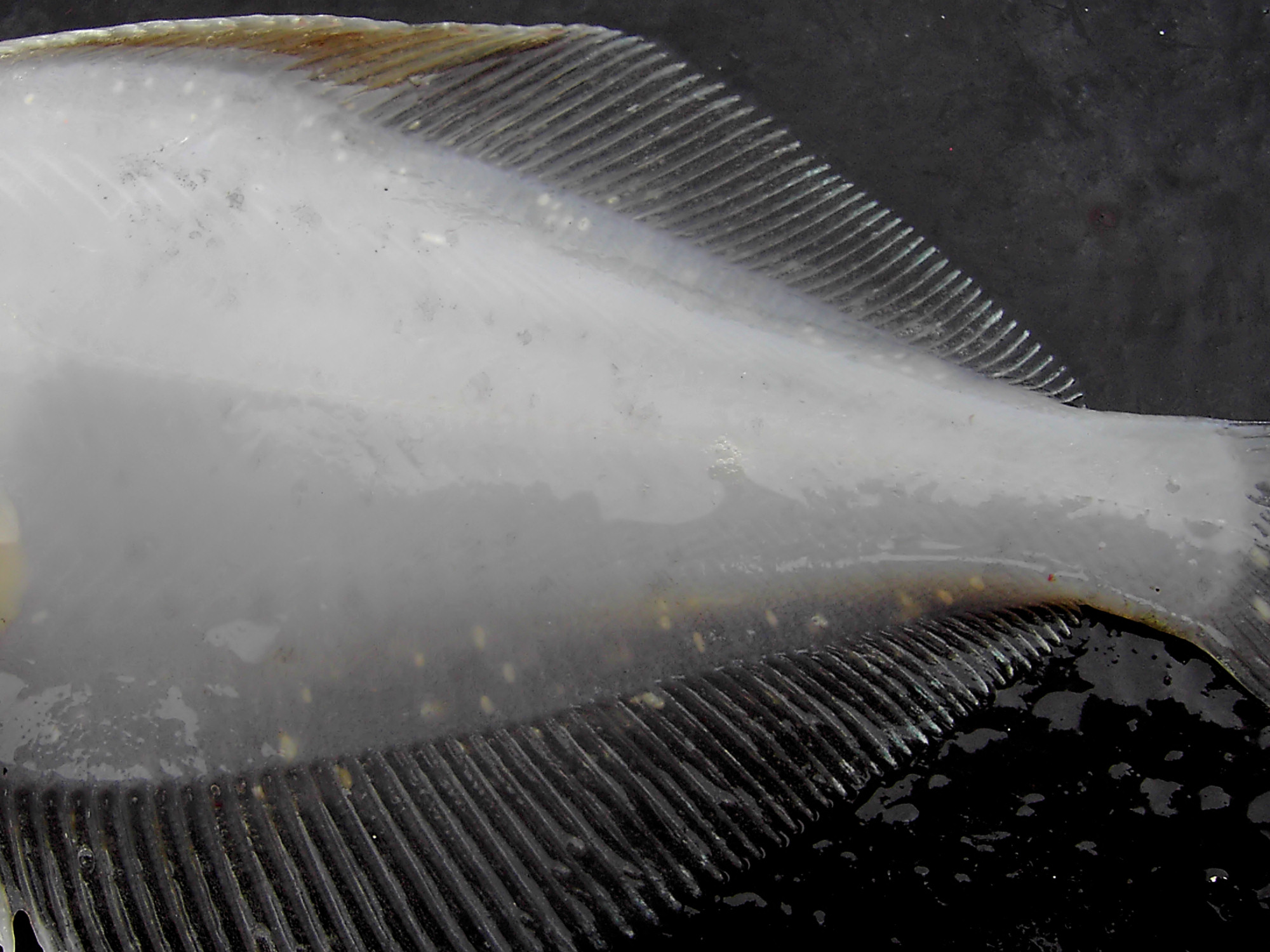
- Parasitical worm (Acanthocolpidae - Digenea) on a Dab

Scientific classification
- Kingdom: Animalia
- Phylum: Platyhelminthes
- Class: Trematoda
- Order: Plagiorchiida
- Suborder: Xiphidiata
- Superfamily: Brachycladioidea
- Family: Acanthocolpidae; Lühe, 1906

= Acanthocolpidae =

Family of flukes

Acanthocolpidae is a family of trematodes belonging to the order Plagiorchiida.

== Genera ==
Genera:

- Acaenodera Manter & Pritchard, 1960
- Acanthocolpus Lühe, 1906
- Critovitellarium Vigueras, 1955
- Pleorchis Railliet, 1896
