= Macroderoididae =

Scientific classification
- Kingdom: Animalia
- Phylum: Platyhelminthes
- Class: Trematoda
- Order: Plagiorchiida
- Suborder: Xiphidiata
- Superfamily: Plagiorchioidea
- Family: Macroderoididae; McMullen, 1937

Family of trematodes

Macroderoididae is a family of trematodes belonging to the order Plagiorchiida.

== Genera ==
Genera:

- Alloglossidium Simer, 1929
- Alloglyptus Byrd, 1950
- Allomacroderoides Watson, 1976
