= Echinochasmidae =

Scientific classification
- Kingdom: Animalia
- Phylum: Platyhelminthes
- Class: Trematoda
- Order: Plagiorchiida
- Suborder: Echinostomata
- Superfamily: Echinostomatoidea
- Family: Echinochasmidae; Odhner, 1910

Family of flukes

Echinochasmidae is a family of trematodes in the order Plagiorchiida.

== Genera ==
- Echinochasmus Dietz, 1909
- Stephanoprora Odhner, 1902
