= Microscaphidiidae =

Scientific classification
- Kingdom: Animalia
- Phylum: Platyhelminthes
- Class: Trematoda
- Order: Plagiorchiida
- Suborder: Pronocephalata
- Superfamily: Paramphistomoidea
- Family: Microscaphidiidae; Looss, 1900

Synonyms
- Angiodictydae

Family of flatworms

Microscaphidiidae is a family of flatworms belonging to the order Plagiorchiida.

== Genera ==
Genera:

- Angiodictyum Looss, 1902
- Curumai Travassos, 1961
- Denticauda Fukui, 1929
- Polyangium Looss, 1902
