= Encyclometridae =

Scientific classification
- Kingdom: Animalia
- Phylum: Platyhelminthes
- Class: Trematoda
- Order: Plagiorchiida
- Suborder: Xiphidiata
- Superfamily: Gorgoderoidea
- Family: Encyclometridae; Mehra, 1931

Family of flukes

Encyclometridae is a family of trematodes belonging to the order Plagiorchiida.

Genera:

- Encyclometra Baylis & Cannon, 1924
- Polylekithum Arnold, 1934
