= Cyclocoelidae =

Scientific classification
- Kingdom: Animalia
- Phylum: Platyhelminthes
- Class: Trematoda
- Order: Plagiorchiida
- Suborder: Echinostomata
- Superfamily: Echinostomatoidea
- Family: Cyclocoelidae; Stossich, 1902

Family of flukes

Cyclocoelidae is a family of trematodes in the order Plagiorchiida.

== Genera ==
The genera are ordered by subfamily.

- Cyclocoelinae Stossich, 1902
  - Circumvitellatrema Dronen, Greiner, Ialeggio & Nolan, 2009
  - Cyclocoelum Brandes, 1892
  - Psophiatrema Dronen & Kinsella, 2009
  - Selfcoelum Dronen, Gardner & Jiménez, 2006
- Haematotrephinae Dollfus, 1948
  - Haematotrephus Stossich, 1902
  - Harrahium Witenberg, 1926
  - Neohaematotrephus Kanev, Radev & Fried, 2002
  - Uvitellina Witenberg, 1923
  - Wardianum Witenberg, 1923
- Hyptiasminae Dollfus, 1948
  - Allopyge Johnston, 1913
  - Hyptiasmus Kossack, 1911
  - Morishitium Witenberg, 1928
  - Prohyptiasmus Witenberg, 1923
- Ophthalmophaginae Harrah, 1922
  - Bothrigaster Dollfus, 1948
  - Opthalmophagus Stossich, 1902
  - Porphyriotrema Duggal & Toor, 1985
  - Promptenovum Witenberg, 1923
  - Spaniometra Kossack, 1911
- Skrjabinocoelinae Dronen, 2007
  - Skrjabinocoelum Kurashvili, 1953
- Szidatitreminae Dronen, 2007
  - Contracoelum Witenberg, 1926
  - Pseudoszidatitrema Dronen & Blend, 2015
  - Szidatitrema Yamaguti, 1971
