= Albulatrematidae =

Scientific classification
- Kingdom: Animalia
- Phylum: Platyhelminthes
- Class: Trematoda
- Order: Azygiida
- Family: Albulatrematidae

Family of flatworms

Albulatrematidae is a family of trematodes belonging to the order Azygiida.

Genera:

- Albulatrema
