= Faustulidae =

Scientific classification
- Kingdom: Animalia
- Phylum: Platyhelminthes
- Class: Trematoda
- Order: Plagiorchiida
- Suborder: Xiphidiata
- Superfamily: Microphalloidea
- Family: Faustulidae; Poche, 1926

Family of flukes

Faustulidae is a family of trematodes belonging to the order Plagiorchiida.

== Genera ==
Genera:

- Allofellodistomum Yamaguti, 1971
- Antorchis Linton, 1911
- Bacciger Nicoll, 1914
