= Atractotrematidae =

Scientific classification
- Domain: Eukaryota
- Kingdom: Animalia
- Phylum: Platyhelminthes
- Class: Trematoda
- Order: Plagiorchiida
- Family: Atractotrematidae

Family of flukes

Atractotrematidae is a family of trematodes belonging to the order Plagiorchiida.

Genera:

- Atractotrema Goto & Ozaki, 1929
- Isorchis Durio & Manter, 1969
- Pseudisorchis Ahmad, 1985
- Pseudomegasolena Machida & Kamiya, 1976
