= Monorchiidae =

Scientific classification
- Kingdom: Animalia
- Phylum: Platyhelminthes
- Class: Trematoda
- Order: Plagiorchiida
- Suborder: Monorchiata
- Superfamily: Monorchioidea
- Family: Monorchiidae; Odhner, 1911

Family of flatworms

Monorchiidae is a family of flatworms belonging to the order Plagiorchiida.

== Genera ==
Genera:

- Allobacciger Hafeezullah & Siddiqi, 1970
- Alloinfundiburictus Wee, Cutmore, Pérez-del-Olmo & Cribb, 2020
- Allolasiotocus Yamaguti, 1959
