= Laurer's canal =

Vagina analogue of trematodes, a class of worm-like parasite

Laurer's canal is a part of the reproductive system of trematodes, analogous to the vagina. Trematodes are a class of worm-like parasites divided into two subclasses, Aspidogastrea and Digenea. In Digeneans, Laurer's canal opens from the dorsal surface of the body. In some Aspidogastreans, the canal ends in a blind ended sac. Laurer's canal may be used by the flukes during copulation, but more normally sperm enters the female system via the common genital atrium, (into which the uterus opens), either during copulation, or self-fertilisation.
