= Lecithasteridae =

Scientific classification
- Kingdom: Animalia
- Phylum: Platyhelminthes
- Class: Trematoda
- Order: Plagiorchiida
- Suborder: Hemiurata
- Superfamily: Hemiuroidea
- Family: Lecithasteridae; Odhner, 1905

Family of flukes

Lecithasteridae is a family of trematodes belonging to the order Plagiorchiida.

== Genera ==
Genera:

- Acanthuritrema Yamaguti, 1970
- Aponurus Looss, 1907
- Assitrema Parukhin, 1976
