= Thrinascotrematidae =

Scientific classification
- Kingdom: Animalia
- Phylum: Platyhelminthes
- Class: Trematoda
- Order: Plagiorchiida
- Suborder: Xiphidiata
- Superfamily: Plagiorchioidea
- Family: Thrinascotrematidae; Jue Sue & Platt, 1999

Family of flukes

Thrinascotrematidae is a family of trematodes belonging to the order Plagiorchiida.

Genera:

- Thrinascotrema
