= Orientocreadiidae =

Scientific classification
- Kingdom: Animalia
- Phylum: Platyhelminthes
- Class: Trematoda
- Order: Plagiorchiida
- Suborder: Xiphidiata
- Superfamily: Plagiorchioidea
- Family: Orientocreadiidae; Yamaguti, 1958

Family of flukes

Orientocreadiidae is a family of trematodes belonging to the order Plagiorchiida.

Genera:

- Macrotrema Gupta, 1951
- Orientocreadium Tubangui, 1931
