= Brachycoeliidae =

Scientific classification
- Kingdom: Animalia
- Phylum: Platyhelminthes
- Class: Trematoda
- Order: Plagiorchiida
- Suborder: Xiphidiata
- Superfamily: Plagiorchioidea
- Family: Brachycoeliidae; Looss, 1899

Family of flukes

Brachycoeliidae is a family of trematodes belonging to the order Plagiorchiida.

Genera:

- Brachycoelium Dujardin, 1845
- Brachycoelium Stiles & Hassall, 1898
- Cymatocarpus Looss, 1899
- Parabrachycoelium Pérez-Ponce de Leon, Mendoza-Garfias, Razo-Mendivil & Parra-Olea, 2011
- Tremiorchis Mehra & Negi, 1926
