= Pachypsolidae =

Scientific classification
- Kingdom: Animalia
- Phylum: Platyhelminthes
- Class: Trematoda
- Order: Plagiorchiida
- Suborder: Xiphidiata
- Superfamily: Microphalloidea
- Family: Pachypsolidae; Yamaguti, 1958

Family of flukes

Pachypsolidae is a family of trematodes belonging to the order Plagiorchiida.

Genera:

- Pachypsolus Looss, 1901
