= Auridistomidae =

Scientific classification
- Kingdom: Animalia
- Phylum: Platyhelminthes
- Class: Trematoda
- Order: Plagiorchiida
- Suborder: Xiphidiata
- Superfamily: Plagiorchioidea
- Family: Auridistomidae; Stunkard, 1924

Family of flukes

Auridistomidae is a family of trematodes belonging to the order Plagiorchiida.

Genera:

- Auridistomum Stafford, 1905
- Patagium Heymann, 1905
