= Gonocercidae =

Scientific classification
- Kingdom: Animalia
- Phylum: Platyhelminthes
- Class: Trematoda
- Order: Plagiorchiida
- Suborder: Hemiurata
- Superfamily: Hemiuroidea
- Family: Gonocercidae; Skrjabin & Guschanskaja, 1955

Family of flukes

Gonocercidae is a family of trematodes belonging to the order Plagiorchiida.

Genera:

- Gonocerca Manter, 1925
- Hemipera Nicoll, 1913
