= Elongoparorchis =

Scientific classification
- Kingdom: Animalia
- Phylum: Platyhelminthes
- Class: Trematoda
- Order: Plagiorchiida
- Family: Dictysarcidae
- Subfamily: Albulatrematinae
- Genus: Elongoparorchis; Rao, 1961

Synonyms
- Dollfustravassosius Teixeira de Freitas & Kohn, 1967; Pelorohelmins Fischthal & Kuntz, 1964; Tetraster Oshmarin, 1965

Genus of flatworms

Elongoparorchis is a genus of flatworms belonging to the family Dictysarcidae.

Species:

- Elongoparorchis arii Shen & Tung, 1984
- Elongoparorchis moniliovatus (Teixeira de Freitas, 1967) Jones & Khalil, 1984
- Elongoparorchis pneumatis Rao, 1961
