= Phaneropsolidae =

Scientific classification
- Kingdom: Animalia
- Phylum: Platyhelminthes
- Class: Trematoda
- Order: Plagiorchiida
- Suborder: Xiphidiata
- Superfamily: Microphalloidea
- Family: Phaneropsolidae; Mehra, 1935

Family of flukes

Phaneropsolidae is a family of trematodes belonging to the order Plagiorchiida.

Genera:

- Microtrema Sitko, 2013
- Mosesia Travassos, 1928
