= Diplangidae =

Scientific classification
- Kingdom: Animalia
- Phylum: Platyhelminthes
- Class: Trematoda
- Order: Plagiorchiida
- Suborder: Xiphidiata
- Superfamily: Microphalloidea
- Family: Diplangidae; Yamaguti, 1971

Family of flukes

Diplangidae is a family of trematodes belonging to the order Plagiorchiida.

Genera:

- Diplangus Linton, 1910
- Pseudodiplangus Yamaguti, 1971
