= Meristocotylidae =

Scientific classification
- Kingdom: Animalia
- Phylum: Platyhelminthes
- Class: Trematoda
- Order: Plagiorchiida
- Suborder: Xiphidiata
- Superfamily: Plagiorchioidea
- Family: Meristocotylidae; Fischthal & Kuntz, 1981

Family of flukes

Meristocotylidae is a family of trematodes belonging to the order Plagiorchiida.

Genera:

- Meristocotyle Fischthal & Kuntz, 1964
