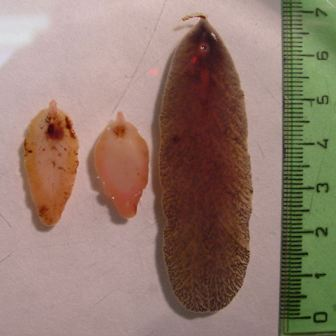
- Adult Common Liver Flukes (Fasciola hepatica, left) and Giant Liver Fluke (Fascioloides magna) of the Fasciolidae

Scientific classification
- Kingdom: Animalia
- Phylum: Platyhelminthes
- Class: Trematoda
- Order: Plagiorchiida
- Suborder: Echinostomata; La Rue, 1926

= Echinostomata =

Suborder of flukes

Echinostomata is a suborder of the parasitic flatworm order Plagiorchiida. The suborder contains numerous species that are parasitic in humans.

== Families ==
All families are in the superfamily Echinostomatoidea Looss, 1902. It has been synonymised with Cyclocoeloidea Stossich, 1902.

- Calycodidae Dollfus, 1929
- Cyclocoelidae Stossich, 1902
- Echinochasmidae Odhner, 1910
- Echinostomatidae Looss, 1899
- Fasciolidae Railliet, 1895
- Himasthlidae Odhner, 1910
- Philophthalmidae Looss, 1899
- Psilostomidae Looss, 1900
- Rhopaliidae Looss, 1899
- Rhytidodidae Odhner, 1926
- Typhlocoelidae Harrah, 1922
