= Exotidendriidae =

Scientific classification
- Kingdom: Animalia
- Phylum: Platyhelminthes
- Class: Trematoda
- Order: Plagiorchiida
- Suborder: Xiphidiata
- Superfamily: Microphalloidea
- Family: Exotidendriidae; Mehra, 1935

Family of flukes

Exotidendriidae is a family of trematodes belonging to the order Plagiorchiida.

Genera:

- Exotidendrium Mehra, 1935
- Renivermis Blair, Purdie & Melville, 1989
- Simhatrema Chattopadhyaya, 1971
