= Syncoeliidae =

Scientific classification
- Kingdom: Animalia
- Phylum: Platyhelminthes
- Class: Trematoda
- Order: Plagiorchiida
- Suborder: Hemiurata
- Superfamily: Hemiuroidea
- Family: Syncoeliidae; Looss, 1899

Family of flukes

Syncoeliidae is a family of trematodes belonging to the order Plagiorchiida.

Genera:

- Copiatestes Crowcroft, 1948
- Otiotrema Setti, 1897
- Paronatrema Dollfus, 1937
- Syncoelium Looss, 1899
