= Styphlotrematidae =

Scientific classification
- Kingdom: Animalia
- Phylum: Platyhelminthes
- Class: Trematoda
- Order: Plagiorchiida
- Suborder: Xiphidiata
- Superfamily: Plagiorchioidea
- Family: Styphlotrematidae; Baer, 1924

Family of flukes

Styphlotrematidae is a family of trematodes belonging to the order Plagiorchiida.

Genera:

- Styphlotrema Odhner, 1910
