= Calycodidae =

Scientific classification
- Kingdom: Animalia
- Phylum: Platyhelminthes
- Class: Trematoda
- Order: Plagiorchiida
- Suborder: Echinostomata
- Superfamily: Echinostomatoidea
- Family: Calycodidae; Dollfus, 1929

Family of flukes

Calycodidae is a family of trematodes belonging to the order Plagiorchiida.

Genera:

- Calycodes Looss, 1901
