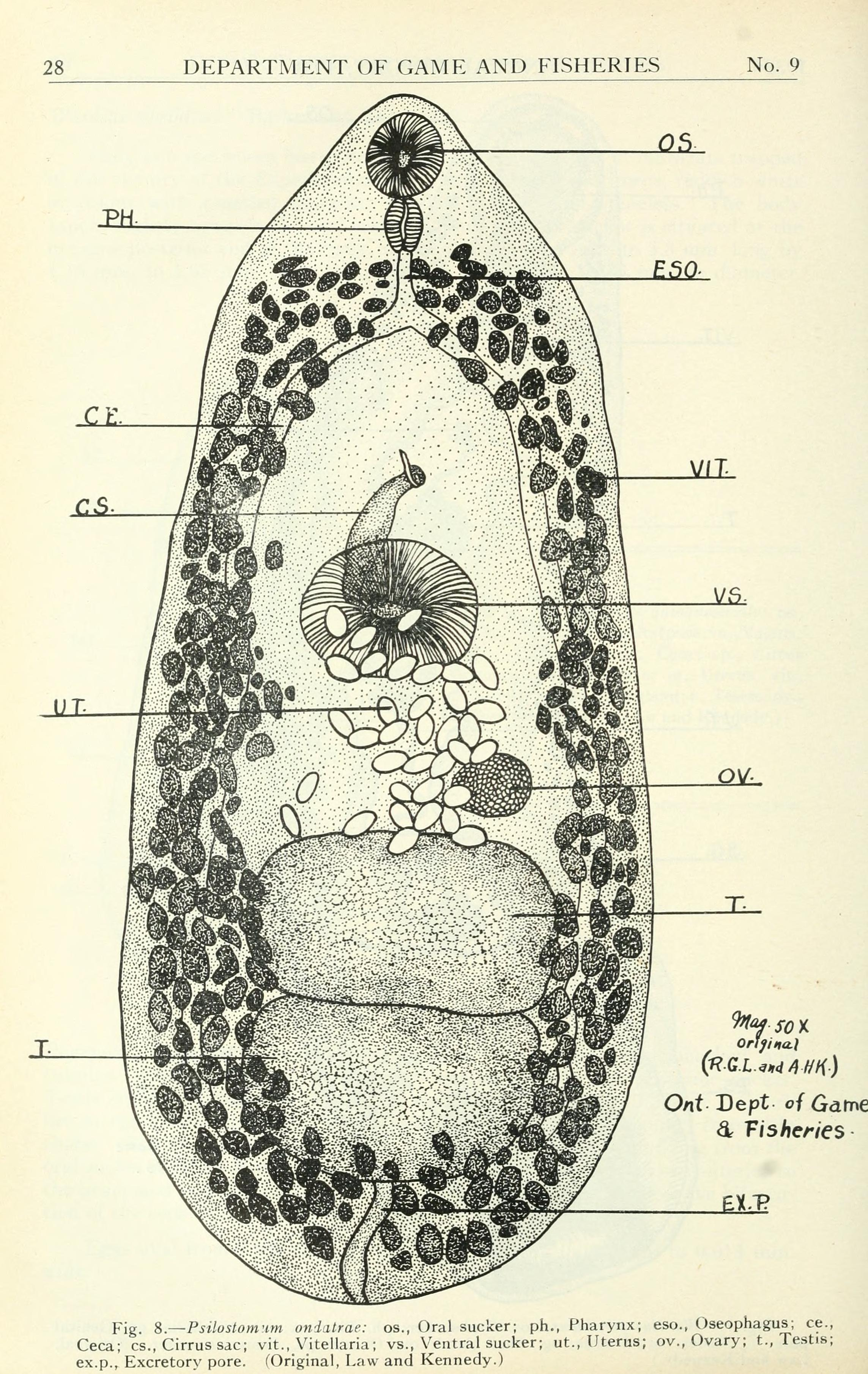
- Psilostomum ondatrae

Scientific classification
- Kingdom: Animalia
- Phylum: Platyhelminthes
- Class: Trematoda
- Order: Plagiorchiida
- Suborder: Echinostomata
- Superfamily: Echinostomatoidea
- Family: Psilostomidae; Looss, 1900

= Psilostomidae =

Family of flukes

Psilostomidae or Psilostomatidae is a family of trematodes belonging to the order Plagiorchiida.

== Genera ==
Genera:

- Astacatrematula Macy & Bell, 1968
- Gyrosoma Bryd, Bogitsh, Maples, 1961
- Mesaulus Braun, 1902
- Pseudopsilostoma Yamaguti, 1958
- Psilochasmus Luhe, 1909
- Psilostomum Looss, 1899
- Psilotornus Byrd & Prestwood, 1969
- Ribeiroia Travassos, 1939
- Sphaeridiotrema Odhner, 1913
- Stephanoproraoides Price, 1934
