= Pronocephalidae =

Scientific classification
- Kingdom: Animalia
- Phylum: Platyhelminthes
- Class: Trematoda
- Order: Plagiorchiida
- Suborder: Pronocephalata
- Superfamily: Pronocephaloidea
- Family: Pronocephalidae; Looss, 1899

Family of flukes

Pronocephalidae is a family of trematodes belonging to the order Plagiorchiida.

== Genera ==
Genera:

- Adenogaster Looss, 1901
- Astrochis Poche, 1925
- Buckarootrema Platt & Brooks, 2001
