= Rhytidodidae =

Scientific classification
- Kingdom: Animalia
- Phylum: Platyhelminthes
- Class: Trematoda
- Order: Plagiorchiida
- Suborder: Echinostomata
- Superfamily: Echinostomatoidea
- Family: Rhytidodidae; Odhner, 1926

Family of flukes

Rhytidodidae is a family of trematodes belonging to the order Plagiorchiida.

Genera:

- Rhytidodes Looss, 1901
- Rhytidodoides Price, 1939
