= Megaperidae =

Scientific classification
- Kingdom: Animalia
- Phylum: Platyhelminthes
- Class: Trematoda
- Order: Plagiorchiida
- Suborder: Apocreadiata; Olson, Cribb, Tkach, Bray & Littlewood, 2003
- Superfamily: Apocreadioidea; Skrjabin, 1942
- Family: Megaperidae; Manter, 1934

Synonyms
- Apocreadiidae Skrjabin, 1942; Euryperidae Manter, 1933 nec Pascoe, 1870; Homalometridae Cable & Hunninen, 1942; Schistorchiidae Yamaguti, 1942; Sphincterostomatidae Yamaguti, 1937; Trematobrienidae Dollfus, 1950

Family of flatworms

Megaperidae is a family of flatworms belonging to the order Plagiorchiida.

Subfamilies and genera:

- Apocreadiinae Skrjabin, 1942
  - Callohelmis Cribb & Bray, 1999
  - Choanodera Manter, 1940
  - Crassicutis Manter, 1936
  - Dactylotrema Bravo-Hollis & Manter, 1957
  - Homalometron Stafford, 1904
  - Marsupioacetabulum Yamaguti, 1952
  - Myzotus Manter, 1940
  - Neoapocreadium Siddiqi & Cable, 1960
  - Neomegasolena Siddiqi & Cable, 1960
  - Pancreadium Manter, 1954
- Megaperinae Manter, 1934
  - Haintestinum Pulis, Curran, Andres & Overstreet, 2014
  - Megapera Manter, 1934
  - Thysanopharynx Manter, 1933
- Postporinae Yamaguti, 1958
  - Postporus Manter, 1949
- Schistorchiinae Yamaguti, 1942
  - Blendiella Magro, Cutmore, Carrasson & Cribb, 2023
  - Lobatotrema Manter, 1963
  - Neomegacreadium Machida & Kuramochi, 1999
  - Paraschistorchis Blend, Karar & Dronen, 2017
  - Plesioschistorchis Blend, Karar & Dronen, 2017
  - Schistorchis Lühe, 1906
  - Sphincteristomum Oshmarin, Mamaev & Parukhin, 1961
  - Sphincterostoma Yamaguti, 1937
