= Ptychogonimidae =

Scientific classification
- Kingdom: Animalia
- Phylum: Platyhelminthes
- Class: Trematoda
- Order: Plagiorchiida
- Suborder: Hemiurata
- Superfamily: Hemiuroidea
- Family: Ptychogonimidae; Dollfus, 1937

Family of flukes

Ptychogonimidae is a family of trematodes belonging to the order Plagiorchiida.

Genera:

- Melogonimus Bray, Brockerhoff & Cribb, 1995
- Ptychogonimus Lühe, 1900
