= Liliatrematidae =

Scientific classification
- Domain: Eukaryota
- Kingdom: Animalia
- Phylum: Platyhelminthes
- Class: Trematoda
- Order: Plagiorchiida
- Family: Liliatrematidae

Family of flukes

Liliatrematidae is a family of trematodes belonging to the order Plagiorchiida.

Genera:

- Liliatrema Gubanov, 1953
