= Hirudinellidae =

Scientific classification
- Kingdom: Animalia
- Phylum: Platyhelminthes
- Class: Trematoda
- Order: Plagiorchiida
- Suborder: Hemiurata
- Superfamily: Hemiuroidea
- Family: Hirudinellidae; Dollfus, 1932

Synonyms
- Botulidae

Family of flatworms

Hirudinellidae is a family of flatworms belonging to the order Plagiorchiida.

Genera:

- Botula
- Botulus Guiart, 1938
- Hirudinella de Blainville, 1828
- Lampritrema Yamaguti, 1940
