= Nudacotylidae =

Scientific classification
- Kingdom: Animalia
- Phylum: Platyhelminthes
- Class: Trematoda
- Order: Plagiorchiida
- Suborder: Pronocephalata
- Superfamily: Pronocephaloidea
- Family: Nudacotylidae; Barker, 1916

Family of flukes

Nudacotylidae is a family of trematodes belonging to the order Plagiorchiida.

Genera:

- Neocotyle Travassos, 1923
- Nudacotyle Barker, 1916
