= Enenteridae =

Scientific classification
- Kingdom: Animalia
- Phylum: Platyhelminthes
- Class: Trematoda
- Order: Plagiorchiida
- Suborder: Lepocreadiata
- Superfamily: Lepocreadioidea
- Family: Enenteridae; Yamaguti, 1958

Family of flukes

Enenteridae is a family of trematodes belonging to the order Plagiorchiida.

Genera:

- Enenterageitus Huston, Cutmore & Cribb, 2019
- Enenterum Linton, 1910
- Koseiria Nagaty, 1942
- Neoenenterum Bilqees & Khatoon, 2004
- Proenenterum Manter, 1954
- Pseudozakia Machida & Araki, 1977
