= Gorgocephalidae =

Scientific classification
- Kingdom: Animalia
- Phylum: Platyhelminthes
- Class: Trematoda
- Order: Plagiorchiida
- Suborder: Lepocreadiata
- Superfamily: Lepocreadioidea
- Family: Gorgocephalidae; Manter, 1966

Family of flukes

Gorgocephalidae is a family of trematodes belonging to the order Plagiorchiida.

Genera:

- Gorgocephalus Manter, 1966
