= Lepidapedidae =

Scientific classification
- Kingdom: Animalia
- Phylum: Platyhelminthes
- Class: Trematoda
- Order: Plagiorchiida
- Suborder: Lepocreadiata
- Superfamily: Lepocreadioidea
- Family: Lepidapedidae; Yamaguti, 1958

Family of flukes

Lepidapedidae is a family of trematodes belonging to the order Plagiorchiida.

== Genera ==
Genera:

- Allolepidapedon Yamaguti, 1940
- Bulbocirrus Yamaguti, 1965
- Gibsonia Gaevskaya & Rodyuk, 1988
