= Deropristidae =

Scientific classification
- Kingdom: Animalia
- Phylum: Platyhelminthes
- Class: Trematoda
- Order: Plagiorchiida
- Suborder: Monorchiata
- Superfamily: Monorchioidea
- Family: Deropristidae; Cable & Hunninen, 1942

Family of flukes

Deropristidae is a family of trematodes belonging to the order Plagiorchiida.

Genera:

- Deropristis Odhner, 1902
- Pristicola Cable, 1952
- Skrjabinopsolus Ivanov, 1937
