= Typhlocoelidae =

Scientific classification
- Kingdom: Animalia
- Phylum: Platyhelminthes
- Class: Trematoda
- Order: Plagiorchiida
- Suborder: Echinostomata
- Superfamily: Echinostomatoidea
- Family: Typhlocoelidae; Harrah, 1922

Family of flukes

Typhlocoelidae is a family of trematodes belonging to the order Plagiorchiida.

Genera:

- Manterocoelum Kanev, Radev & Fried, 2002
- Neivaia Travassos, 1929
- Polycyclorchis Pence & Bush, 1973
- Tracheophilus Skrjabin, 1913
- Typhlocoelum Stossich, 1903
