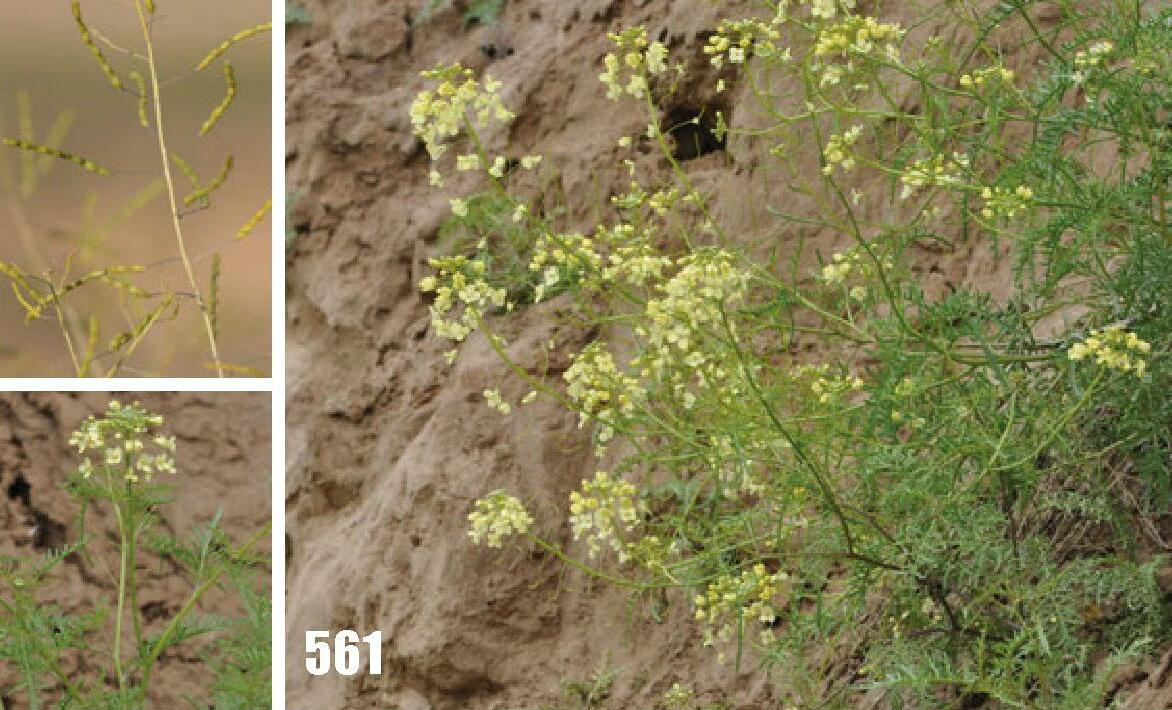
- Cymatocarpus heterophyllus

Scientific classification
- Kingdom: Plantae
- Clade: Tracheophytes
- Clade: Angiosperms
- Clade: Eudicots
- Clade: Rosids
- Order: Brassicales
- Family: Brassicaceae
- Genus: Cymatocarpus; O.E.Schulz

= Cymatocarpus (plant) =

Genus of flowering plants

Cymatocarpus is a genus of flowering plants belonging to the family Brassicaceae.

Its native range is Caucasus to Central Asia.

Species:

- Cymatocarpus grossheimii N.Busch
- Cymatocarpus heterophyllus (Popov) N.Busch
- Cymatocarpus pilosissimus (Trautv.) O.E.Schulz
