= Dictysarcidae =

Scientific classification
- Kingdom: Animalia
- Phylum: Platyhelminthes
- Class: Trematoda
- Order: Plagiorchiida
- Suborder: Hemiurata
- Superfamily: Hemiuroidea
- Family: Dictysarcidae; Skrjabin & Guschanskaja, 1955

Synonyms
- Aerobiotrematidae Yamaguti, 1958; Cylindrorchiidae Poche, 1926; Pelorohelminthidae Fischthal & Thomas, 1968

Family of flukes

Dictysarcidae is a family of trematodes belonging to the order Plagiorchiida.

Genera:

- Aerobiotrema Yamaguti, 1958
- Albulatrema Yamaguti, 1965
- Cylindrorchis Southwell, 1913
- Dictysarca Linton, 1910
- Elongoparorchis Rao, 1961
- Pelorohelmis
