= Gyliauchenidae =

Scientific classification
- Kingdom: Animalia
- Phylum: Platyhelminthes
- Class: Trematoda
- Order: Plagiorchiida
- Suborder: Lepocreadiata
- Superfamily: Lepocreadioidea
- Family: Gyliauchenidae; Fukui, 1929

Family of flukes

Gyliauchenidae is a family of trematodes belonging to the order Plagiorchiida.

== Genera ==
Genera:

- Affecauda Hall & Chambers, 1999
- Apharyngogyliauchen Yamaguti, 1942
- Endochortophagus Huston, Miller, Cutmore & Cribb, 2019
