= Proterodiplostomidae =

Scientific classification
- Kingdom: Animalia
- Phylum: Platyhelminthes
- Class: Trematoda
- Order: Diplostomida
- Superfamily: Diplostomoidea
- Family: Proterodiplostomidae; Dubois, 1936

Family of flukes

Proterodiplostomidae is a monotypic family of trematodes in the order Diplostomida. It consists of one subfamily, Polycotylinae Monticelli, 1888, which consists of one genus, Cheloniodiplostomum Sudarikov, 1960, which consists of four species: Cheloniodiplostomum argentinense Palumbo & Diaz, 2018; Cheloniodiplostomum breve (MacCallum, 1921); Cheloniodiplostomum delillei (Zerecero, 1947); and Cheloniodiplostomum testudinis (Dubois, 1936).
