= Rhabdiopoeidae =

Scientific classification
- Kingdom: Animalia
- Phylum: Platyhelminthes
- Class: Trematoda
- Order: Plagiorchiida
- Suborder: Pronocephalata
- Superfamily: Pronocephaloidea
- Family: Rhabdiopoeidae; Poche, 1926

Family of flukes

Rhabdiopoeidae is a family of trematodes belonging to the order Plagiorchiida.

Genera:

- Faredifex Blair, 1981
- Haerator Blair, 1981
- Rhabdiopoeus Johnston, 1913
- Taprobanella Crusz & Fernand, 1954
