= Mesometridae =

Scientific classification
- Kingdom: Animalia
- Phylum: Platyhelminthes
- Class: Trematoda
- Order: Plagiorchiida
- Suborder: Pronocephalata
- Superfamily: Paramphistomoidea
- Family: Mesometridae; Poche, 1926

Family of flukes

Mesometridae is a family of trematodes belonging to the order Plagiorchiida.

Genera:

- Centroderma Lühe, 1901
- Elstia Bray, 1984
- Mesometra Lühe, 1901
- Neowardula Al-Jahdali, 2010
- Parawardula Jones & Blair, 2005
- Wardula Poche, 1926
