= Opisthotrematidae =

Scientific classification
- Kingdom: Animalia
- Phylum: Platyhelminthes
- Class: Trematoda
- Order: Plagiorchiida
- Suborder: Pronocephalata
- Superfamily: Pronocephaloidea
- Family: Opisthotrematidae; Poche, 1926

Family of flukes

Opisthotrematidae is a family of trematodes belonging to the order Plagiorchiida.

Genera:

- Folitrema Blair, 1981
- Lankatrema Crusz & Fernand, 1954
- Lankatrematoides Blair, 1981
- Moniligerum Dailey, Vogelbein & Forrester, 1988
- Opisthotrema Fischer, 1884
- Pulmonicola Poche, 1926
