= Hemiuridae =

Scientific classification
- Kingdom: Animalia
- Phylum: Platyhelminthes
- Class: Trematoda
- Order: Plagiorchiida
- Suborder: Hemiurata
- Superfamily: Hemiuroidea
- Family: Hemiuridae; Looss, 1899

Family of flukes

Hemiuridae is a family of trematodes belonging to the order Plagiorchiida containing 514 described species.

== Genera ==
Genera:

- Adinosoma Manter, 1947
- Allostomachicola Yamaguti, 1958
- Aphanuroides Nagaty & Abdel-Aal, 1962
- Aphanurus Looss, 1907
- Broreascotia Bray & Zdzitowiecki, 2000
- Brachyphallus Odhner, 1905
- Bunocotyle Odhner, 1928
- Catarinatrema Teixeira de Freitas & Santos, 1971
- Cyatholecithochirium Yamaguti, 1970
- Dinosoma Manter, 1934
- Dinurus Looss, 1907
- Dissosaccus Manter, 1947
- Duosphincter Manter & Pritchard, 1960
- Ectenurus Looss, 1907
- Elytrophalloides Szidat, 1955
- Elytrophallus Manter, 1940
- Erilepturus Woolcock, 1935
- Genolinea Manter, 1925
- Glomericirrus Yamaguti, 1937
- Gonocerella
- Hemiurus Rudolphi, 1809
- Hypohepaticola Yamaguti, 1934
- Indoderogenes Srivastava, 1941
- Lecithochirium Lühe, 1901
- Lecithocladium Lühe, 1901
- Lethadena Manter, 1947
- Mecoderus Manter, 1940
- Merlucciotrema Yamaguti, 1971
- Mitrostoma Manter, 1954
- Monolecithotrema Yamaguti, 1970
- Musculovesicula Yamaguti, 1940
- Myosaccium Montgomery, 1957
- Neopisthadena Machida, 1980
- Neotheletrum Gibson & Bray, 1979
- Opisthadena Linton, 1910
- Paradinurus Vigueras, 1958
- Parahemiurus Vaz & Pereira, 1930
- Paralecithochirium Zhang, 1994
- Plerurus Looss, 1907
- Plicatrium Manter & Pritchard, 1960
- Prolecithochirium Yamaguti, 1970
- Pronopyee
- Pseudocypseluritrema Parukhin, 1974
- Pseudodinosoma Yamaguti, 1970
- Pulmovermis Coil & Kuntz, 1960
- Qadriana Bilqees, 1971
- Robinia Pankov, Webster, Blasco-Costa, Gibson, Littlewood, Balbuena & Kostadinova, 2006
- Saturnius Manter, 1969
- Saurokoilophilia Bursey, Goldberg & Kraus, 2008
- Sterrhurina Abdel Aal, Banaja & Al Zanbagi, 1984
- Stomachicola Yamaguti, 1934
- Synaptobothrioides Bray & Nahhas, 2002
- Synaptobothrium von Linstow, 1904
- Theletrum Linton, 1910
- Tricotyledonia Fyfe, 1954
- Tubulovesicula Yamaguti, 1934
