= Lissorchiidae =

Scientific classification
- Kingdom: Animalia
- Phylum: Platyhelminthes
- Class: Trematoda
- Order: Plagiorchiida
- Suborder: Monorchiata
- Superfamily: Monorchioidea
- Family: Lissorchiidae; Magath, 1917

Family of flatworms

Lissorchiidae is a family of flatworms belonging to the order Plagiorchiida.

== Genera ==
Genera:

- Alloplagiorchis Simer, 1931
- Asaccotrema Sokolov & Gordeev, 2019
- Asymphylodora Looss, 1899
