= Fellodistomidae =

Scientific classification
- Kingdom: Animalia
- Phylum: Platyhelminthes
- Class: Trematoda
- Order: Plagiorchiida
- Suborder: Gymnophallata
- Superfamily: Gymnophalloidea
- Family: Fellodistomidae; Nicoll, 1909

Synonyms
- Fellodistomatidae

Family of worms

Fellodistomidae is a family of trematodes belonging to the order Plagiorchiida.
