= Botulisaccidae =

Scientific classification
- Kingdom: Animalia
- Phylum: Platyhelminthes
- Class: Trematoda
- Order: Plagiorchiida
- Suborder: Gymnophallata
- Superfamily: Gymnophalloidea
- Family: Botulisaccidae; Yamaguti, 1971

Family of worms

Botulisaccidae is a family of trematodes belonging to the order Plagiorchiida.

Genera:

- Botulisaccus Caballero y C., Bravo-Hollis & Grocott, 1955
