= Bathycotylidae =

Scientific classification
- Kingdom: Animalia
- Phylum: Platyhelminthes
- Class: Trematoda
- Order: Plagiorchiida
- Suborder: Hemiurata
- Superfamily: Hemiuroidea
- Family: Bathycotylidae; Dollfus, 1932

Family of flukes

Bathcotylidae is a family of trematodes belonging to the order Plagiorchiida.

Genera:

- Bathycotyle Darr, 1902
