= Labicolidae =

Scientific classification
- Kingdom: Animalia
- Phylum: Platyhelminthes
- Class: Trematoda
- Order: Plagiorchiida
- Suborder: Pronocephalata
- Superfamily: Pronocephaloidea
- Family: Labicolidae; Blair, 1979

Family of flukes

Labicolidae is a family of trematodes belonging to the order Plagiorchiida.

Genera:

- Labicola Blair, 1979
