= Haplosplanchnidae =

Scientific classification
- Kingdom: Animalia
- Phylum: Platyhelminthes
- Class: Trematoda
- Order: Plagiorchiida
- Suborder: Haplosplanchnata; Olson, Cribb, Tkach, Bray & Littlewood, 2003
- Superfamily: Haplosplanchnoidea; Poche, 1925
- Family: Haplosplanchnidae; Poche, 1926

Family of flatworms

Haplosplanchnidae is a family of flatworms belonging to the order Plagiorchiida.

== Genera ==
Genera:

- Discocephalotrema Machida, 1993
- Haplosplanchnoides Nahhas & Cable, 1964
- Haplosplanchnus Looss, 1902
