= Sclerodistomoididae =

Scientific classification
- Kingdom: Animalia
- Phylum: Platyhelminthes
- Class: Trematoda
- Order: Plagiorchiida
- Suborder: Hemiurata
- Superfamily: Hemiuroidea
- Family: Sclerodistomoididae; Gibson & Bray, 1979

Family of flukes

Sclerodistomoididae is a family of trematodes belonging to the order Plagiorchiida.

Genera:

- Sclerodistomoides Kamegai, 1971
