= Bivesiculidae =

Scientific classification
- Kingdom: Animalia
- Phylum: Platyhelminthes
- Class: Trematoda
- Order: Plagiorchiida
- Suborder: Bivesiculata; Olson, Cribb, Tkach, Bray & Littlewood, 2003
- Superfamily: Bivesiculoidea; Yamaguti, 1934
- Family: Bivesiculidae; Yamaguti, 1934

Synonyms
- Family synonymy: Paucivitellosinae Yamaguti, 1971; Treptodemidae Yamaguti, 1971

Family of flukes

Bivesiculidae is a family of trematodes in the order Plagiorchiida.

== Genera ==
- Bivesicula Yamaguti, 1934
- Bivesiculoides Yamaguti, 1938
- Paucivitellosus Coil, Reid & Kuntz, 1965
- Treptodemoides Shen & Qiu, 1995
- Treptodemus Manter, 1961
