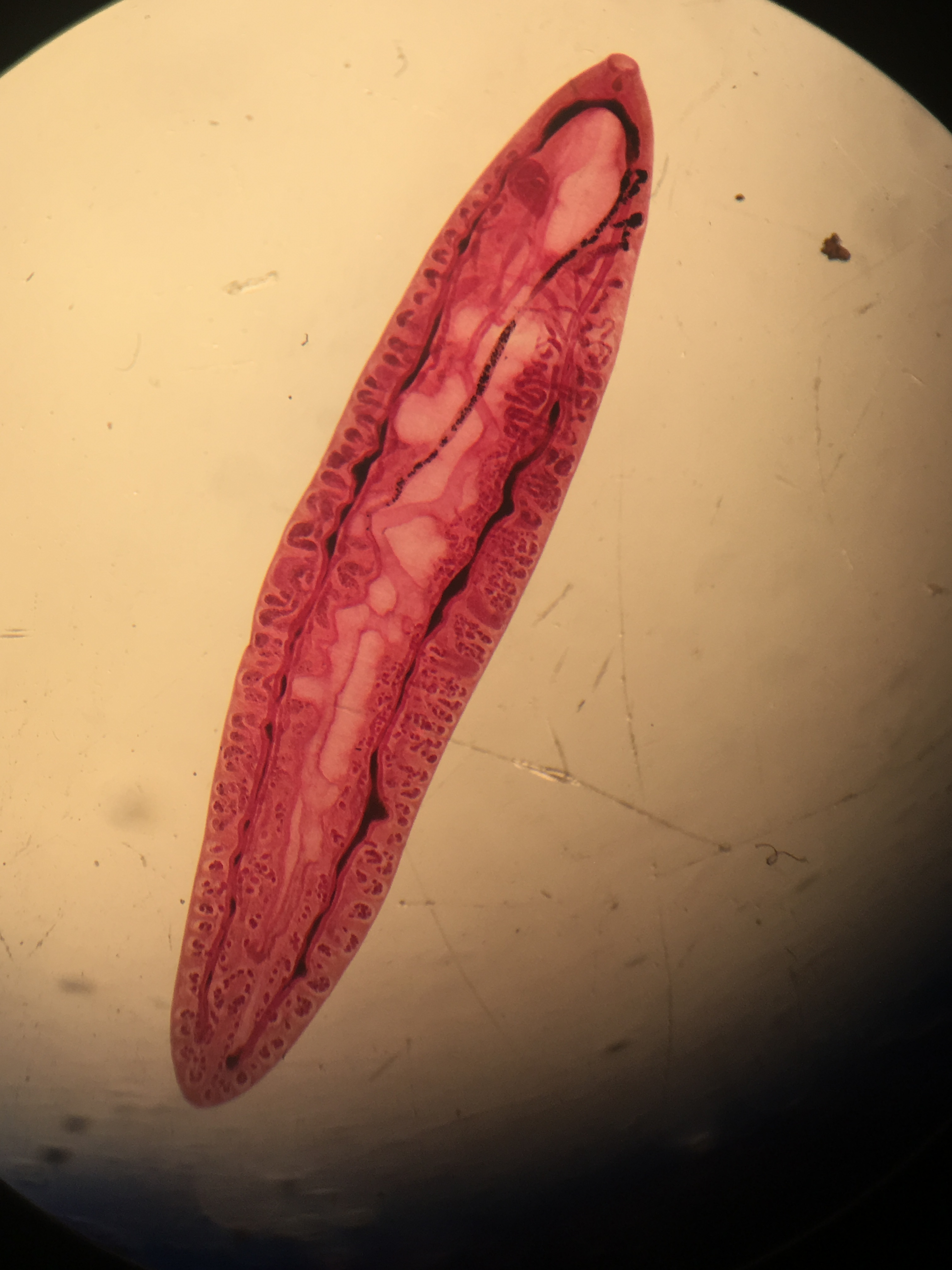
- Heronimus mollis

Scientific classification
- Missing taxonomy template (fix): Heronimidae

= Heronimidae =

Family of flukes

Heronimidae is a family of digenean trematode parasites consisting of a single genus with a single species. The sole species of this family, Heronimus mollis (Leidy, 1856) is a parasite of the lungs of a number of species of turtles across North and Central America.
