= Azygiidae =

Scientific classification
- Kingdom: Animalia
- Phylum: Platyhelminthes
- Class: Trematoda
- Order: Plagiorchiida
- Suborder: Hemiurata
- Superfamily: Azygioidea; Lühe, 1909
- Family: Azygiidae; Lühe, 1909

Synonyms
- Aphanhysteridae Guiart, 1938

Family of flatworms

Azygiidae is a family of flatworms belonging to the order Plagiorchiida.

Genera:

- Azygia Looss, 1899
- Leuceruthrus Marshall & Gilbert, 1905
- Otodistomum Stafford, 1904
- Proterometra Horsfall, 1934
