= Isoparorchiidae =

Scientific classification
- Kingdom: Animalia
- Phylum: Platyhelminthes
- Class: Trematoda
- Order: Plagiorchiida
- Suborder: Hemiurata
- Superfamily: Hemiuroidea
- Family: Isoparorchiidae; Travassos, 1922

Family of flukes

Isoparorchiidae is a family of trematodes belonging to the order Plagiorchiida.

Genera:

- Isoparorchis Southwell, 1913
