= Didymozoidae =

Scientific classification
- Kingdom: Animalia
- Phylum: Platyhelminthes
- Class: Trematoda
- Order: Plagiorchiida
- Suborder: Hemiurata
- Superfamily: Hemiuroidea
- Family: Didymozoidae; Monticelli, 1888

Family of flatworms

Didymozoidae is a family of parasitic flatworms (class Trematoda) within the order Plagiorchiida. The group comprises endoparasitic flukes that primarily infect the tissues of marine teleost fishes.

Adult didymozoids are typically found encysted within the tissues of pelagic fishes, especially tunas and mackerels. The paired worms are enclosed within a shared cyst, which provides protection and facilitates reproduction. The family includes numerous genera such as Didymozoon, Nematobothrium, and Allometanematobothrioides.

== Distribution ==
Species within the family Didymozoidae are found worldwide in tropical and temperate oceans, following the distribution of their pelagic fish hosts.

== Morphology ==
Members of the family exhibit extreme sexual dimorphism; the females are generally much larger and encase the smaller males within their bodies. Didymozoids have a highly reduced digestive system and obtain nutrients directly from the tissues or body fluids of their hosts.

== Genera ==
The following genera are recognised within the family Didymozoidae:

- Adenodidymocystis Yamaguti, 1970
- Allodidymocodium Yamaguti, 1970
- Allometanematobothrioides Yamaguti, 1965
- Didymozoon Monticelli, 1888
- Nematobothrium Lühe, 1900

== Genera ==
Genera:

- Adenodidymocystis Yamaguti, 1970
- Allodidymocodium Yamaguti, 1970
- Allometanematobothrioides Yamaguti, 1965
