= Haploporidae =

Scientific classification
- Kingdom: Animalia
- Phylum: Platyhelminthes
- Class: Trematoda
- Order: Plagiorchiida
- Suborder: Haploporata
- Superfamily: Haploporoidea
- Family: Haploporidae; Nicoll, 1914

Family of flukes

Haploporidae is a family of trematodes in the order Plagiorchiida.

== Genera ==
The genera are organised by their subfamily.

- Chalcinotrematinae Overstreet & Curran, 2005
  - Chalicinotrema Texeira de Freitas, 1947
  - Paralecithobotrys Teixeira de Freitas, 1948
  - Intromugil Overstreet & Curran, 2005
  - Saccocoelioides Szidat, 1954
- Forticulcitinae Blasco-Costa, Balbuena, Kostadinova & Olson, 2009
  - Forticulcita Overstreet, 1982
  - Xiha Andres, Curran, Fayton, Pulis & Overstreet, 2015
- Haploporinae Nicoll, 1914
  - Dicrogaster Looss, 1902
  - Elliptobursa Wu, Lü & Zhu, 1996
  - Haploporus Looss, 1902
  - Lecithobotrys Looss, 1902
  - Litosaccus Andres, Pulis, Cribb & Overstreet, 2014
  - Pseudodicrogaster Blasco-Costa, Montero, Gibson, Balbuena & Aneta Kostadinova, 2009
  - Pseudolecithobotrys Blasco-Costa, Gibson, Balbuena, Raga & Kostadinova, 2009
  - Ragaia Blasco-Costa, Montero, Gibson, Balbuena & Aneta Kostadinova, 2009
  - Saccocoelium Looss, 1902
  - Unisaccus Martin, 1973
- Megasoleninae Manter, 1935
  - Hapladena Linton, 1910
  - Megasolena Linton, 1910
  - Metamegasolena Yamaguti, 1970
  - Myodera Montgomery, 1957
  - Vitellibaculum Montgomery, 1957
- Waretrematinae Srivastava, 1937
  - Capitimitta Pulis & Overstreet, 2013
  - Carassotrema Park, 1938
  - Conohelmins Fischthal & Nasir, 1974
  - Culuwiya Overstreet & Curran, 2005
  - Elonginurus Lü, 1995
  - Parasaccocoelium Zhukov, 1971
  - Pholeohedra Cribb, Pichelin & Bray, 1998
  - Platydidymus Overstreet & Curran, 2005
  - Pseudohapladena Yamaguti, 1952
  - Saccocoelioides Szidat, 1954
  - Skrjabinolecithum Belous, 1954
  - Spiritestis Nagaty, 1948
  - Waretrema Srivastava, 1937
- Pseudohaploporinae Atopkin et al., 2019
