= Konstantin Skryabin =

Russian and Soviet zoologist

- Born: 7 December [O.S. 25 November] 1878; Saint Petersburg, Russian Empire
- Died: 17 October 1972 (aged 93); Moscow, Soviet Union
- Education: Dorpat (Tartu) Veterinary Institute
- Awards: Hero of Socialist Labour
- Scientific career
- Fields: Biology, Helminthology

Konstantin Ivanovich Skryabin (Russian: Константин Иванович Скрябин; 7 December [O.S. 25 November] 1878 – 17 October 1972) was a Soviet scientist in the field of helminthology, academician of the Academy of Sciences of the Soviet Union (1939), and academician of USSR Academy of Medical Sciences. He was a founder of the helminthology school, and an author of landmark books on helminths in Soviet Union.

== Life ==
Konstantin Skryabin was born in Saint Petersburg. His mother Anna Kellermann was a daughter of German agriculturist. In 1905 he graduated from Dorpat (Tartu) Veterinary Institute. From 1905 to 1911 Skryabin worked as a veterinary physician in Aulie-Ata and Shymkent. In 1912 to 1914 he was sent on assignment mission to Germany, Switzerland, and France. From 1915 to 1917, Skryabin worked as a researcher in the Central Veterinary Laboratory of Saint Petersburg. In 1917 he became a professor of the Parasitology Department of Don Veterinary Institute in Novocherkassk. He was a Head of the Department of the Moscow Veterinary Institute (1920-1925) and (1933-1941), and at the same time Head of Helminthology Division of the Central Tropical Institute (1921-1941).

== Eponymous taxa ==
About 40 genera were named after Skryabin:

- Skrjabinella
- Skrjabinodentus
- Skrjabinocercella
- Skrjabinoeces
- Skrjabinostrongylus
- Skrjabinobilharzia
- Skrjabinobronema
- Skrjabinocapillaria
- Skrjabinocara
- Skrjabinocerca
- Skrjabinocercella
- Skrjabinocerina
- Skrjabinochona
- Skrjabinochora
- Skrjabinocladorchis
- Skrjabinoclava
- Skrjabinocoelum
- Skrjabinocta
- Skrjabinodendrium
- Skrjabinodera
- Skrjabinodon
- Skrjabinoeces
- Skrjabinofilaria
- Skrjabinolecithum
- Skrjabinomermis
- Skrjabinomerus
- Skrjabinonchus
- Skrjabinoparaksis
- Skrjabinophora
- Skrjabinophyetus
- Skrjabinoplagiorchis
- Skrjabinoporus
- Skrjabinopsolus
- Skrjabinoptera
- Skrjabinorhynchus
- Skrjabinosomum
- Skrjabinotaenia
- Skrjabinotaurus
- Skrjabinotrema
- Skrjabinovermis
- Skrjabinozoum

== Awards and honors ==
- Honored Science Worker of the RSFSR (1927)
- Six Orders of Lenin (1936, 1949, 1953, 1953, 1958, 1968)
- Two Stalin Prizes, 1st class (1941, 1950)
- Three Orders of the Red Banner of Labour (1945, 1945, 1951)
- Order of the Red Star (1946)
- Lenin Prize (1957)
- Hero of Socialist Labour (1958)
- Order of Georgi Dimitrov
