= Arthur Looss =

German zoologist and parasitologist

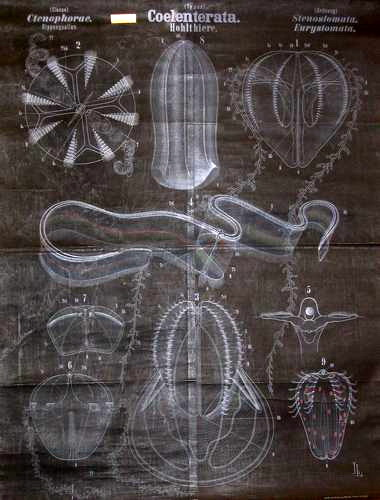
Ctenophora

Arthur Looss (16 March 1861 – 4 May 1923) was a German zoologist and parasitologist. Looss was born in 1861 in Chemnitz, and was educated both there and in Łódź, Poland. Thereafter, he studied at the University of Leipzig, where he received a doctorate for his study of trematodes.

Looss was sent by Rudolf Leuckart to Egypt to study the transmission of bilharzia, where he became accidentally infected with hookworm, and in so doing discovered the method by which the larvae penetrate the skin. He spilt some larval culture onto his hand in 1896, while dropping it into the mouths of guinea pigs; observing the irritation this caused to his skin, he hypothesised that infection pass through the skin. He examined his faeces at intervals and found hookworm eggs in it a few weeks later. The paper he wrote about the life cycle of the hookworm is considered a classic in the field. He later described the species as Ancylostoma duodenale.

Looss continued to work as a professor of parasitology and biology in Egypt until the outbreak of the First World War. It is reported that "Looss' enthusiasm and energy as a research worker have probably seldom been surpassed, and all his work was characterized by a painstaking attention to detail that is unfortunately rare".

Looss died on May 4, 1923, in Gießen, Germany.
