= Teodor Odhner =

Swedish zoologist

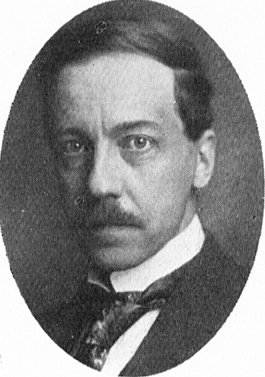
- Born: February 25, 1879; Lund, Sweden
- Died: October 29, 1928 (aged 49); Stockholm, Sweden
- Burial place: Northern Cemetery, Solna, Sweden
- Occupation: Zoologist
- Children: Clas-Erik Odhner
- Parents: Clas Theodor Odhner (father); Emma Hedvig Charlotta Knos (mother)

Nils Johan Teodor Odhner (February 25, 1879 – October 29, 1928) was a Swedish zoologist. Odhner was born in Lund, Sweden. He was the son of the historian and archivist Clas Theodor Odhner and the father of the agronomist Clas-Erik Odhner.

Odhner became an associate professor of zoology at Uppsala University in 1905, a professor of zoology at the University of Oslo in 1914, a professor and curator of the Swedish Museum of Natural History in Stockholm in the invertebrate department in 1918, and also director of the Stockholm Workers' Institute (Stockholms arbetareinstitut) in 1922.

Odhner participated in Gustaf Kolthoff's zoological expeditions to Svalbard and eastern Greenland in 1900, and in Leonard Jägerskiöld expedition to the White Nile in 1901. He also conducted zoological studies at the stations in Trieste and Naples. He made several contributions to the literature on the anatomy and classification of the flukes, and in 1925 he was elected a member of the Royal Swedish Academy of Sciences, where he served as vice secretary from 1923 to 1928.

== Bibliography ==
- 1905: "Die Trematoden des arktischen Gebietes" (The Trematoda of the Arctic Region). Fauna Arctica 4: 289–372.
- 1907: "Zur Anatomie der Didymozoen: ein getrenntgeschlechtlicher Trematode mit rudimentarem Hermaphroditismus" (The Anatomy of the Didymozooidea: A Gender-Specific Trematode with Rudimentary Hermaphroditism). In: Zoologiska studier tillägnade professor T. Tullberg på hans 65-års dag, pp. 309–342. Uppsala: Naturvetenskapliga studentsallskapet i Uppsala.
- 1910: Nordostafrikanische Trematoden: grösstenteils vom Weissen Nil (von der schwedischen zoologischen Expedition gesammelt) (Northeast African Trematoda: Mostly from the White Nile, Collected by the Swedish Zoological Expedition). Uppsala: K.W. Appelbergs Boktryckeri.
- 1912: "Zum natürlichen System der digenen Trematoden" (The Natural System of the Digene Trematoda). Zoologischer Anzeiger 41: 54–71.
- 1923: "Marine Crustacea Podophthalmata aus Angola und Südafrika gesammelt von H. Skoog 1912" (Marine Crustacea Podophthalmata from Angola and South Africa Collected by Hilmer Skoog in 1912). Göteborgs kungl. vetenskaps-och vitterhets-samhälles handlingar 27: 1–39.
- 1925: Monographierte Gattungen der Krabbenfamilie Xanthidae (Monographed Genera of the Crab Family Xanthidae). Göteborg: Elanders Boktryckeri Aktiebolag.
