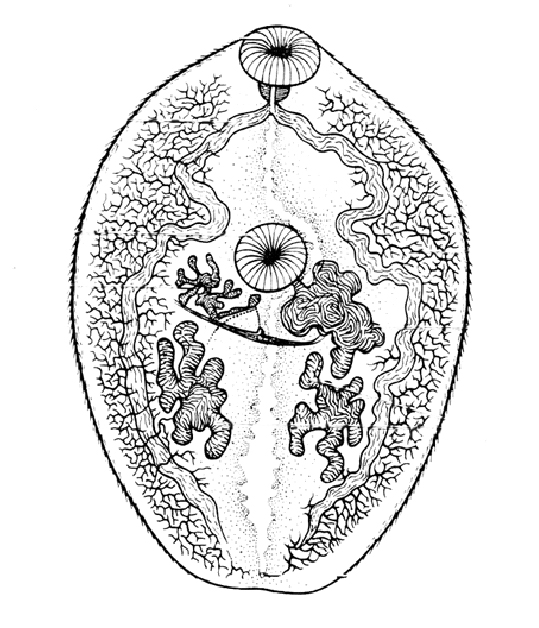
- Paragonimus westermani (Troglotremata: Paragonimidae)

Scientific classification
- Kingdom: Animalia
- Phylum: Platyhelminthes
- Class: Trematoda
- Subclass: Digenea
- Order: Plagiorchiida; La Rue, 1957

= Plagiorchiida =

Order of flukes

Plagiorchiida is a large order of trematodes, synonymous to Echinostomida. They belong to the Digenea, a large subclass of flukes. This order contains relatively few significant parasites of humans.

The following families are placed here, organised by superfamily and suborder:

- Apocreadiata
  - Apocreadioidea Skrjabin, 1942
    - Apocreadiidae Skrjabin, 1942
- Bivesiculata
  - Bivesiculoidea
    - Bivesiculidae Yamaguti, 1934
- Bucephalata
  - Bucephaloidea Poche, 1907
    - Bucephalidae Poche, 1907
    - Nuitrematidae Kurochkin, 1975
- Echinostomata
  - Echinostomatoidea Looss, 1902
    - Caballerotrematidae Tkach, Kudlai & Kostadinova, 2016
    - Calycodidae Dollfus, 1929
    - Cyclocoelidae Stossich, 1902
    - Echinochasmidae Odhner, 1910
    - Echinostomatidae Looss, 1899
    - Fasciolidae Railliet, 1895
    - Himasthlidae Odhner, 1910
    - Philophthalmidae Looss, 1899
    - Psilostomidae Looss, 1900
    - Rhytidodidae Odhner, 1926
    - Typhlocoelidae Harrah, 1922
- Gymnophallata
  - Gymnophalloidea Odhner, 1905
    - Botulisaccidae Yamaguti, 1971
    - Fellodistomidae Nicoll, 1909
    - Gymnophallidae Odhner, 1905
    - Tandanicolidae Johnston, 1927
- Haploporata
  - Haploporoidea Nicoll, 1914
    - Atractotrematidae Yamaguti, 1939
    - Haploporidae Nicoll, 1914
- Haplosplanchnata
  - Haplosplanchnoidea Poche, 1925
    - Haplosplanchnidae Poche, 1926
- Hemiurata
  - Azygioidea Lühe, 1909
    - Azygiidae Lühe, 1909
  - Hemiuroidea Looss, 1899
    - Accacoeliidae Odhner, 1911
    - Bathycotylidae Dollfus, 1932
    - Derogenidae Nicoll, 1910
    - Dictysarcidae Skrjabin & Guschanskaja, 1955
    - Didymozoidae Monticelli, 1888
    - Gonocercidae Skrjabin & Guschanskaja, 1955
    - Hemiuridae Looss, 1899
    - Hirudinellidae Dollfus, 1932
    - Isoparorchiidae Travassos, 1922
    - Lecithasteridae Odhner, 1905
    - Ptychogonimidae Dollfus, 1937
    - Sclerodistomidae Odhner, 1927
    - Sclerodistomoididae Gibson & Bray, 1979
    - Syncoeliidae Looss, 1899
- Heronimata
  - Heronimoidea Ward, 1918
    - Heronimidae Ward, 1918
- Lepocreadiata
  - Lepocreadioidea Odhner, 1905
    - Aephnidiogenidae Yamaguti, 1934
    - Enenteridae Yamaguti, 1958
    - Gorgocephalidae Manter, 1966
    - Gyliauchenidae Fukui, 1929
    - Lepidapedidae Yamaguti, 1958
    - Lepocreadiidae Odhner, 1905
    - Lepocreadioidea incertae sedis
    - Liliatrematidae Gubanov, 1953
- Monorchiata
  - Monorchioidea Odhner, 1911
    - Deropristidae Cable & Hunninen, 1942
    - Lissorchiidae Magath, 1917
    - Monorchiidae Odhner, 1911
- Opisthorchiata
  - Opisthorchioidea Braun, 1901
    - Cryptogonimidae Ward, 1917
    - Heterophyidae Leiper, 1909
    - Opisthorchiidae Looss, 1899
- Pronocephalata
  - Paramphistomoidea Fischoeder, 1901
    - Cladorchiidae Fischoeder, 1901
    - Mesometridae Poche, 1926
    - Microscaphidiidae Looss, 1900
    - Paramphistomidae Fischoeder, 1901
  - Pronocephaloidea Looss, 1899
    - Labicolidae Blair, 1979
    - Notocotylidae Lühe, 1909
    - Nudacotylidae Barker, 1916
    - Opisthotrematidae Poche, 1926
    - Pronocephalidae Looss, 1899
    - Rhabdiopoeidae Poche, 1926
- Transversotremata
  - Transversotrematoidea Witenberg, 1944
    - Transversotrematidae Witenberg, 1944
- Xiphidiata
  - Brachycladioidea Odhner, 1905
    - Acanthocolpidae Lühe, 1906
    - Brachycladiidae Odhner, 1905
  - Gorgoderoidea Looss, 1901
    - Allocreadiidae Looss, 1902
    - Anchitrematidae Mehra, 1935
    - Braunotrematidae Yamaguti, 1958
    - Callodistomidae Odhner, 1910
    - Collyriclidae Ward, 1917
    - Dicrocoeliidae Looss, 1899
    - Encyclometridae Mehra, 1931
    - Gorgoderidae Looss, 1899
    - Mesocoeliidae Faust, 1924
    - Orchipedidae Skrjabin, 1913
  - Microphalloidea Ward, 1901
    - Diplangidae Yamaguti, 1971
    - Eucotylidae Skrjabin, 1924
    - Exotidendriidae Mehra, 1935
    - Faustulidae Poche, 1926
    - Lecithodendriidae Lühe, 1901
    - Microphallidae Ward, 1901
    - Pachypsolidae Yamaguti, 1958
    - Phaneropsolidae Mehra, 1935
    - Pleurogenidae Looss, 1899
    - Prosthogonimidae Lühe, 1909
    - Renicolidae Dollfus, 1939
    - Zoogonidae Odhner, 1902
  - Opecoelioidea Ozaki, 1925
    - Batrachotrematidae Dollfus & Williams, 1966
    - Opecoelidae Ozaki, 1925
    - Zdzitowieckitrema Sokolov, Lebedeva, Gordeev & Khasanov, 2019
  - Plagiorchioidea Lühe, 1901
    - Auridistomidae Lühe, 1901
    - Brachycoeliidae Looss, 1899
    - Cephalogonimidae Looss, 1899
    - Choanocotylidae Jue Sue & Platt, 1998
    - Echinoporidae Krasnolobova & Timofeeva, 1965
    - Leptophallidae Dayal, 1938
    - Macroderoididae McMullen, 1937
    - Meristocotylidae Fischthal & Kuntz, 1981
    - Ocadiatrematidae Fischthal & Kuntz, 1981
    - Orientocreadiidae Yamaguti, 1958
    - Plagiorchiidae Lühe, 1901
    - Styphlotrematidae Baer, 1924
    - Telorchiidae Looss, 1899
    - Thrinascotrematidae Jue Sue & Platt, 1999
  - Troglotrematoidea Odhner, 1914
    - Paragonimidae Dollfus, 1939
    - Troglotrematidae Odhner, 1914
