= Robert-Philippe Dollfus =

French zoologist and parasitologist

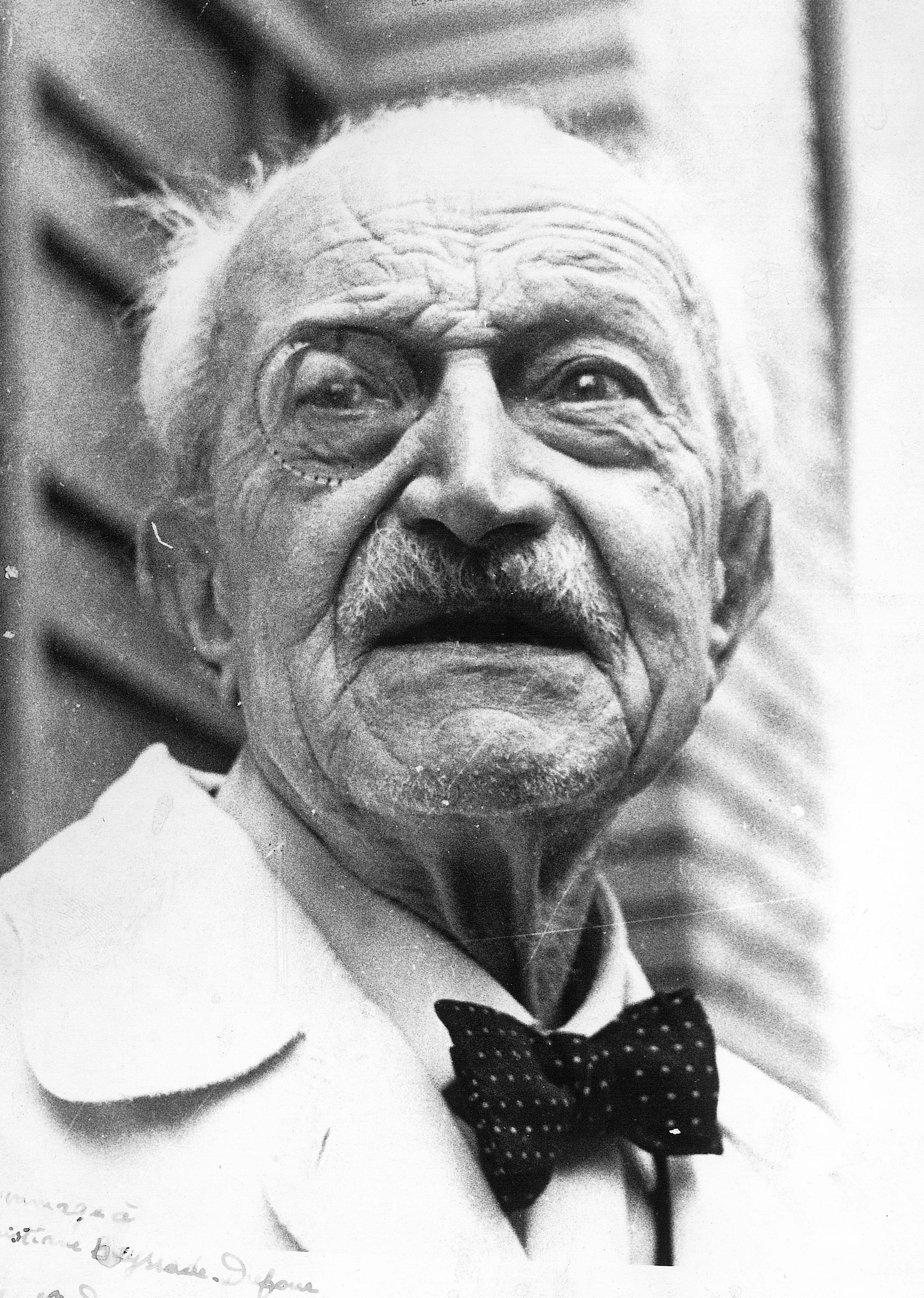
- Robert-Philippe Dollfus in 1975
- Born: July 20, 1887; Paris, France
- Died: February 19, 1976 (aged 88); Paris, France
- Citizenship: French
- Known for: Digenea, Cestoda, Acanthocephala, Nematoda
- Awards: Croix de Guerre, Legion of Honour
- Scientific career
- Fields: Parasitology, Helminthology, Zoology
- Workplaces: Muséum National d'Histoire Naturelle
- Thesis: Études critiques sur les Tétrarhynques du Muséum de Paris (1941)

Robert-Philippe Dollfus (20 July 1887 in Paris, France – 19 February 1976 in Paris, France) was a French zoologist and parasitologist.

== Career ==
Robert-Philippe Dollfus was born in Paris on July 20, 1887, in a family of Protestant tradition. His father was Gustave Frédéric Dollfus, a French geologist and malacologist.

Very early on, he attended the laboratories of Alfred Giard and that of Alfred Blanchard. As early as 1912, at the age of 25, he established the notion of metacercaria, a stage of the lifecycle of Digenea. In 1914, he was on an oceanographic mission aboard the Research Vessel Pourquoi-Pas under the orders of Jean-Baptiste Charcot. During the Second World War, he was a stretcher bearer and auxiliary doctor.

Between the wars, he worked as a "préparateur" in a laboratory of the National Museum of Natural History in Paris. However, he was able to carry out scientific expeditions in Morocco (1923-1928), the Red Sea (1928-1929) and in 1929-1930 in the Atlantic on the RV Pourquoi-Pas. He then studied fish and crustaceans, but began to study parasites, under the supervision of French parasitologist Émile Brumpt.

In 1941, he defended his thesis on Trypanorhyncha Cestodes, published in 1942. He was elected President of the Zoological Society of France in 1940. He then became Director of a laboratory at the École Pratique des Hautes Etudes in Paris. After the Second World War, he became a confirmed helminthologist and parasitologist, but never succeeded in obtaining a post of Professor at the National Museum of Natural History. In 1957, despite his retirement, he continued to work every day at the National Museum of Natural History, practically until his death in 1976. In 1962, he was elected President of the French Society of Parasitology.

Every spring, Robert-Philippe Dollfus went to Morocco, where his daughter lived, to work at the Institut Scientifique Chérifien. He produced articles on helminths and a Catalog of Fishes from the Atlantic Coast of Morocco.

Robert-Philippe Dollfus’s scientific collections are now in the National Museum of Natural History in Paris.

== Eponymous taxa ==
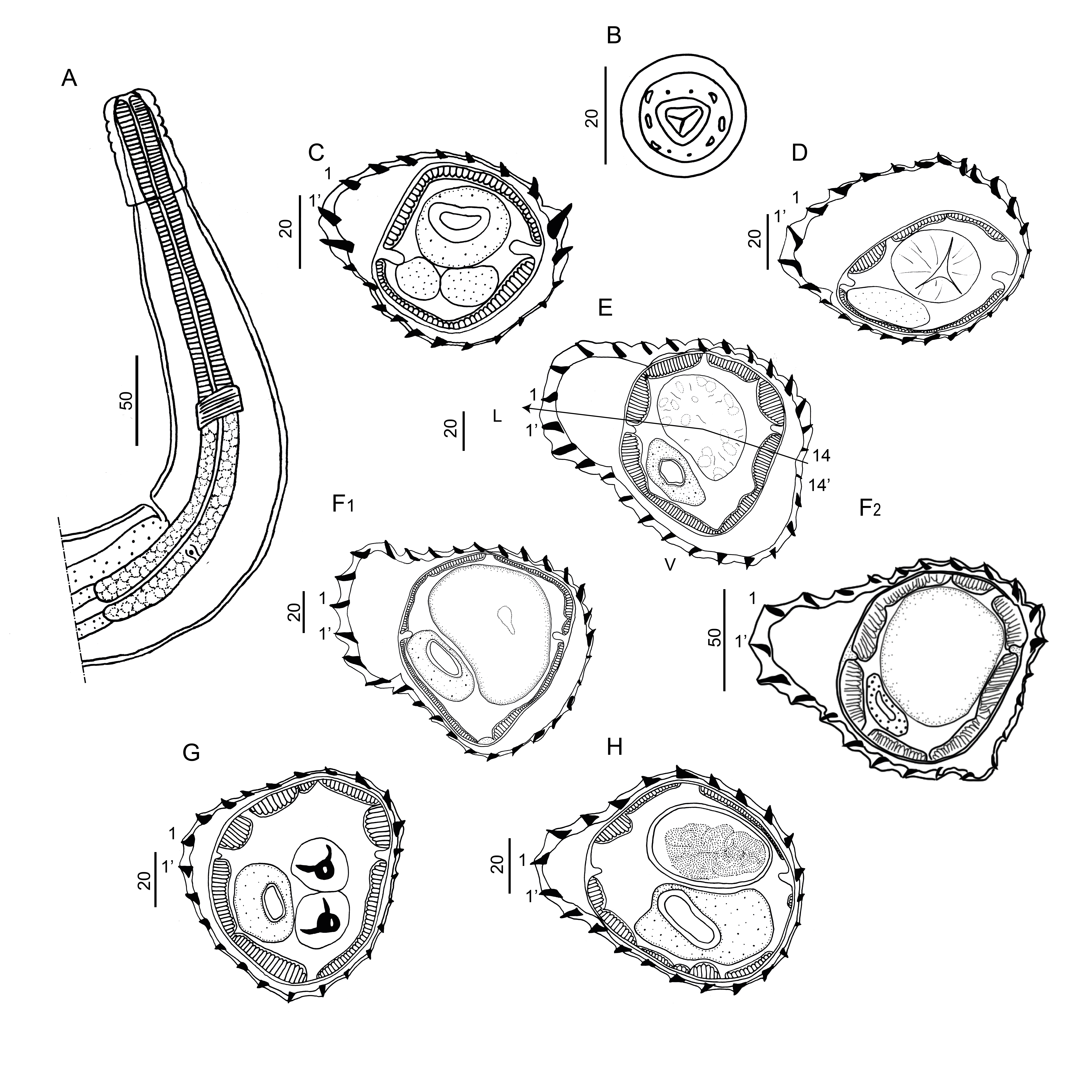
The nematode Hassalstrongylus dollfusi, an example of taxon named after Robert-Philippe Dollfus

A number of taxa, generally parasites, were named in his honour. Genera include the digenean Dollfustrema Eckmann, 1934, the cestode Dollfusiella Campbell & Beveridge, 1994, and the Acanthocephala Dollfusentis Golvan, 1969. Species include the nematode Hassalstrongylus dollfusi (Díaz-Ungría, 1963) Durette-Desset, 1971.

== Awards ==
- Croix de Guerre
- Legion of Honour (1953)

== Books ==
- Dollfus, R. P. (1942). Notes diverses sur les Tétrarhynques. Muséum national d'Histoire naturelle, Paris, 41p. (Mémoires du Muséum national d'Histoire naturelle - Nouvelle Série (1935-1950); 22 (5)).
- Dollfus R. P. 1946. Parasites (animaux et végétaux) des Helminthes. Hyperparasites, ennemis et prédateurs des Helminthes parasites et des Helminthes libres. Essai de compilation méthodique. Encyclopédie Biologique, volume XXVII. Paul Lechevalier, Paris, 483 pages.
- Dollfus, R. P. F. (1953). Aperçu général sur l'histoire naturelle des parasites animaux de la morue Atlanto-Arctique, Gadus callarias L. (Morhua L.) (Vol. 43). Paul Lechevalier, Paris.
- Dollfus, R. P. 1968. Les Trématodes de l’histoire naturelle des Helminthes de Félix Dujardin (1845). Muséum national d'Histoire naturelle, Paris, 77p. (Mémoires du Muséum national d'Histoire naturelle, Sér. A – Zoologie (1950-1992); 54 (3)).

== Selected works ==
- Dollfus, Robert Ph. (1974). "Énumération des Cestodes du plancton et des Invertébrés marins 8e Contribution avec un appendice sur le genre Oncomegas R.-Ph. Dollfus 1929". Annales de Parasitologie Humaine et Comparée. 49 (4): 381–410. doi:10.1051/parasite/1974494381.
- Dollfus, Robert Ph. (1973). "Du genre Monodhelmis R. Ph. Dollfus 1937 et de la famille Monodhelminthidae". Annales de Parasitologie Humaine et Comparée. 48 (2): 263–273. doi:10.1051/parasite/1973482263.
- Dollfus, Robert-Ph.; Golvan, Yves-J. (1963). "Sur un singulier Métacanthocéphale parasite d'insectivores (Tenrecinae) de Madagascar et des Comores". Annales de Parasitologie Humaine et Comparée. 38 (5): 793–806. doi:10.1051/parasite/1963385793.
- Dollfus, Robert-Ph. (1962). "Deux espèces de Trématodes monogénétiques, parasites du "Bluefin tuna" de Californie". Annales de Parasitologie Humaine et Comparée. 37 (4): 517–529. doi:10.1051/parasite/1962374517.
- Dollfus, Robert-Ph. (1965). "Mission Yves-J. Golvan et Jean-A. Rioux en Iran". Annales de Parasitologie Humaine et Comparée. 40 (1): 61–86. doi:10.1051/parasite/1965401061.
- Dollfus, Robert Ph. (1960). "Recherches expérimentales sur Nicolla gallica (R.-Ph. Dollfus 1941) R.-Ph. Dollfus 1958, sa cercaire cotylicerque et sa métacercaire progénétique. Observations sur la famille des Coitocaecidæ Y. Ozaki 1928, s.f. Coitocaecinæ F. Poche 1926 Trematoda Podocotyloidea et sur les cercaires cotylicerques d'eau douce et marines". Annales de Parasitologie Humaine et Comparée. 35 (1–2): 65–115. doi:10.1051/parasite/1960351065.
