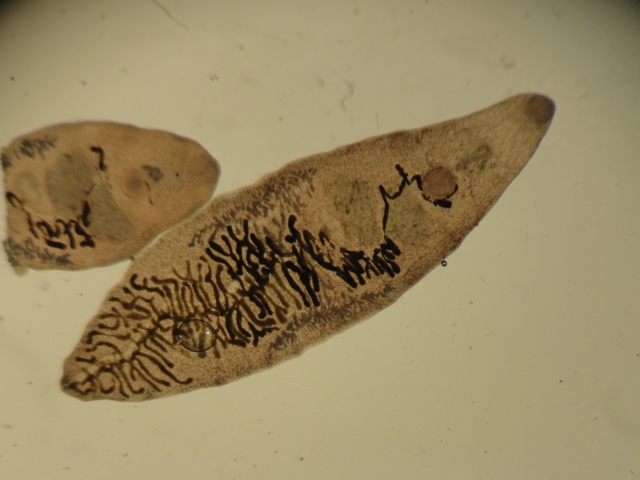

Scientific classification
- Kingdom: Animalia
- Phylum: Platyhelminthes
- Class: Trematoda
- Order: Plagiorchiida
- Suborder: Xiphidiata; Olson, Cribb, Tkach, Bray & Littlewood, 2003

= Xiphidiata =

Suborder of flukes

Xiphidiata is a suborder of Plagiorchiida, an order of parasitic flatworms (flukes).

The following superfamilies are in the suborder Xiphidiata:

- Brachycladioidea Odhner, 1905
- Gorgoderoidea Looss, 1901
- Microphalloidea Ward, 1901
- Opecoeloidea Ozaki, 1925
- Plagiorchioidea Lühe, 1901
- Troglotrematoidea Odhner, 1914

The genus Zdzitowieckitrema, with the single species Zdzitowieckitrema incognitum, described by Sokolov, Lebedeva, Gordeev, & Khasanov in 2017, is yet unplaced within the suborder Xiphidiata.
