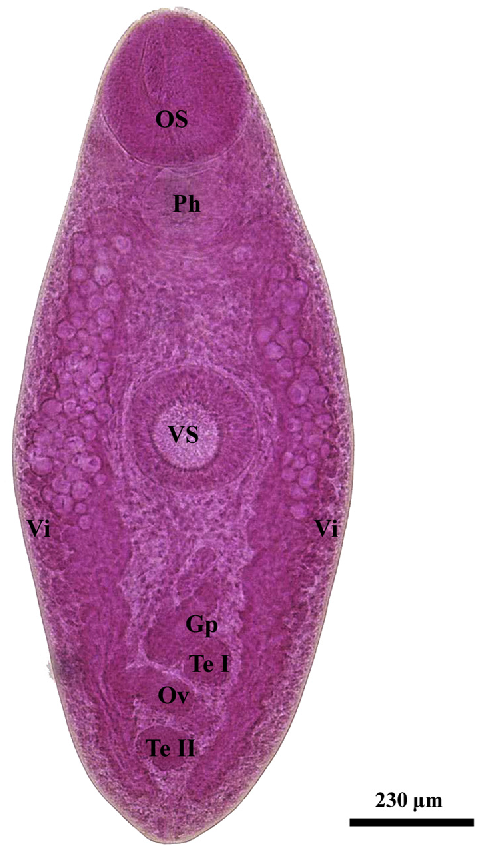

Scientific classification
- Kingdom: Animalia
- Phylum: Platyhelminthes
- Class: Trematoda
- Order: Diplostomida
- Family: Brachylaimidae
- Genus: Brachylaima; Dujardin, 1843

Species
- Brachylaima arcuate; Brachylaima cribbi; Brachylaima fuscata; Brachylaima mesostoma; Brachylaima virginianum

Synonyms
- Brachilaimus Dujardin, 1844; Brachylaema; Brachylaemus Blanchard, 1847; Brachylemus Diesing, 1850; Ectosiphonus; Entosiphonus; Harmostomum Braun, 1899

= Brachylaima =

Genus of flukes

Brachylaima is a genus of trematodes that can infect the gastrointestinal tract of human beings.

== Epidemiology and transmission ==
The first documented case of Brachylaima infestation (known as brachylaimiasis) in a human was in 1996, with 8 subsequent cases in the next 4 years. Diagnosis has spread from Australia to other parts of the world, such as the Spanish cities of Barcelona, Bilbao, Madrid, Tudela, Valencia, and Zaragoza. Snails in France are also infected by metacercariae of two species of Brachylaima. Moreover, a study in 2022, from the United Kingdom identified three Brachylaima (Brachylaima arcuate, B. fuscata and B. mesostoma) were present in wild terrestrial gastropod species in the city of Nottingham.

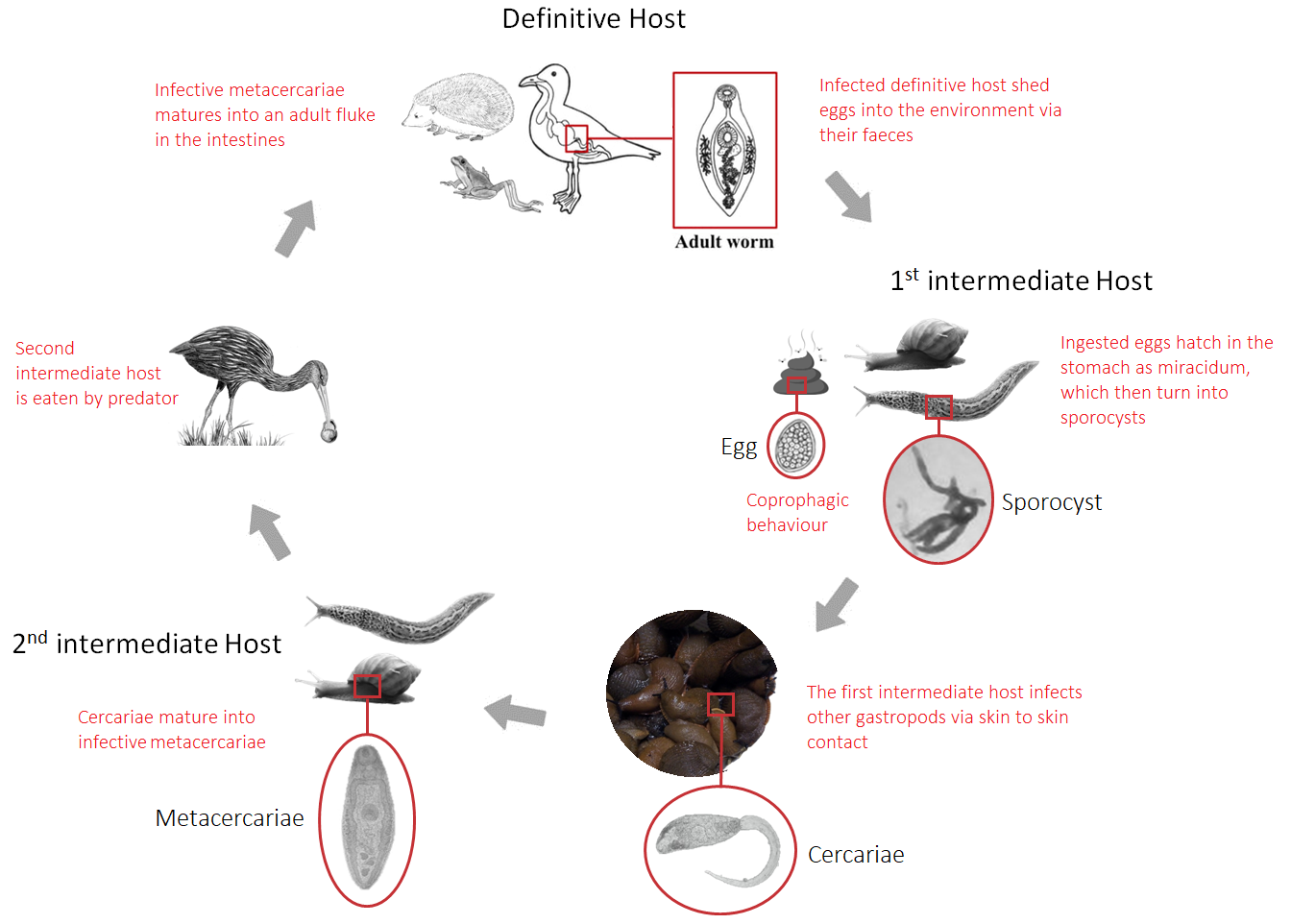
The transmission cycle of Brachylaimiasis

Transmission occurs via the ingestion of infected undercooked (or raw) terrestrial gastropods, such as Cornu aspersum (Pulmonata: Stylommatophora). Gastropods act as both the first and second intermediate host in the terrestrial life cycle of Brachylaima species. The first intermediate host harbors asexual sporocysts and produces cercaria through their mucous glands to infect other gastropods via skin to skin contact. The second intermediate host harbors unencysted metacercariae in their kidneys (e.g. Cochlicella acuta, Cernuella virgata and Theba pisana). Definitive hosts of this species include various species of amphibians, birds, mammals and reptiles. It was first believed that the infection of humans was from children who had purposely eaten the snails, and adults have accidentally ingested snails on vegetables and become infected. Though this may be the case in some parts of the world, it has been shown that humans actively ingest these snails as a source of food in some areas. One study showed that the Spanish city of Tudela had a very high prevalence of the parasite in the snails that were sold as food, though this prevalence fluctuates throughout the year, with the peak season being autumn. This prevalence has become a public concern in many Spanish countries due to the spread of brachylaimiasis. Eggs of this species can remain viable in feces/soil for up to twelve months. The sporocyst infection is 7–10 weeks after the eggs have been ingested.

== Clinical features ==
Clinical features have varied from recurrent short-lived episodic abdominal pain to recurrent severe watery diarrhea, which has a 5-10% mortality rate

Cardiac arrhythmias associated with heart failure refractory to treatment were present in a child infected and completely resolved with anti-helminthic treatment.

== Diagnosis ==
Diagnosis is by examination of stools, in search of the eggs of the parasite, but is highly dependent on the skill and technique of the laboratory worker, with previous diagnoses missed by other hospital labs and only noted after examination at The Queen Elizabeth Hospital in Woodville, Adelaide, South Australia.

== Treatment ==
Treatment with a round of praziquantel results in complete resolution of symptoms and clearance of eggs from stools.
