= Brachylaima virginianum =

Scientific classification
- Kingdom: Animalia
- Phylum: Platyhelminthes
- Class: Trematoda
- Order: Diplostomida
- Family: Brachylaimidae
- Genus: Brachylaima
- Species: B. virginianum

Binomial name
- Brachylaima virginianum (Dickerson, 1930)

Species of fluke

Brachylaima virginianum is a fluke of the genus Brachylaima that infects the Virginia opossum (Didelphis virginiana) throughout its range. It has also been found in young black bears (Ursus americanus) and in marsh rice rats (Oryzomys palustris), both from Florida, and from raccoons (Procyon lotor) in Kentucky.

== Literature cited ==
- Foster, G.W., Cunningham, M.W., Kinsella, J.M. and Forrester, D.J. 2004. Parasitic helminths of black bear cubs (Ursus americanus) from Florida (subscription required). The Journal of Parasitology 90(1):173–175.
- Kinsella, J.M. 1988. Comparison of helminths of rice rats, Oryzomys palustris, from freshwater and saltwater marshes in Florida. Proceedings of the Helminthological Society of Washington 55(2):275–280.
- Cole R.A. and Shoop W.L. 1987. Helminths of the raccoon (Procyon lotor) from Western Kentucky. The Journal of Parasitology 73(4):762-768.
