= Coleophora seriphidii =

Scientific classification
- Kingdom: Animalia
- Phylum: Arthropoda
- Class: Insecta
- Order: Lepidoptera
- Family: Coleophoridae
- Genus: Coleophora
- Species: C. seriphidii

Binomial name
- Coleophora seriphidii Falkovitsh, 1978

Species of moth

Coleophora seriphidii is a moth of the family Coleophoridae. It is found in Turkestan and Kyrgyzstan.

The larvae feed on the leaves of Artemisia turanica. Fully fed larvae estivate and hibernate.
