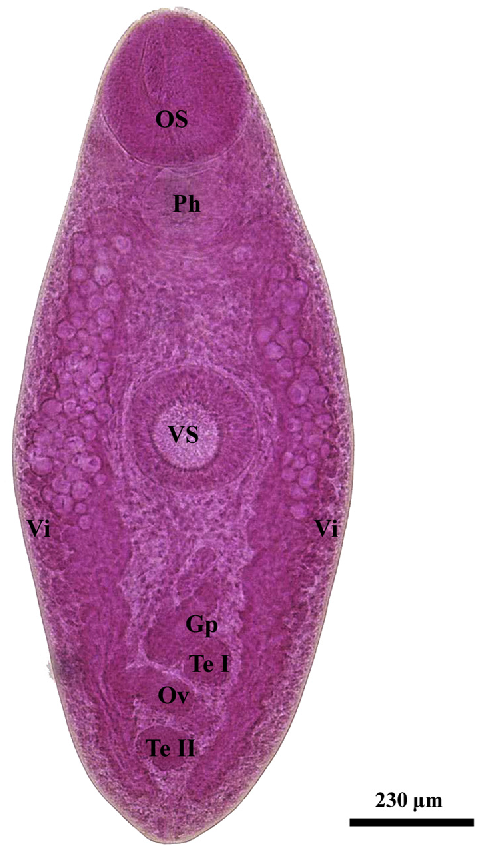

Scientific classification
- Kingdom: Animalia
- Phylum: Platyhelminthes
- Class: Trematoda
- Order: Diplostomida
- Family: Brachylaimidae
- Genus: Brachylaima
- Species: B. cribbi

Binomial name
- Brachylaima cribbi Butcher and Grove, 2001

= Brachylaima cribbi =

Species of fluke

Brachylaima cribbi is a species of terrestrial trematode parasites in the family Brachylaimidae. It is named after Thomas Cribb, a helminthologist at the University of Queensland.

== Life cycle ==
Intermediate hosts for Brachylaima cribbi are terrestrial gastropods, such as Cochlicella acuta, Cernuella virgata and Theba pisana. The terminal hosts are mammals (including humans), birds, and reptiles.

== Range ==
Brachylaima cribbi is known from Australia, but probably originates from Europe, like its intermediate hosts do.
