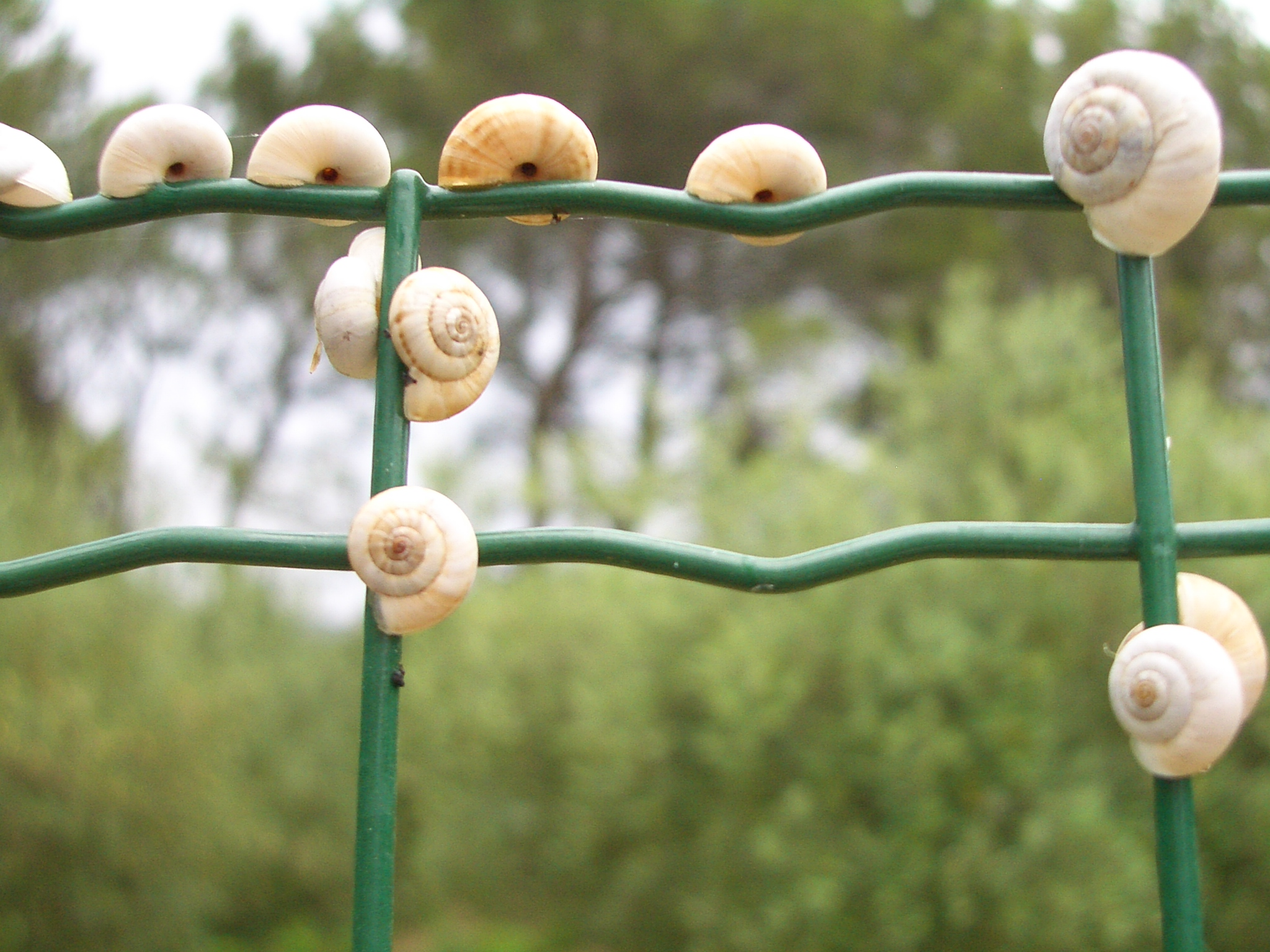
- Cernuella virgata aestivating on a fence in Provence.

Scientific classification
- Kingdom: Animalia
- Phylum: Mollusca
- Class: Gastropoda
- Order: Stylommatophora
- Family: Geomitridae
- Subfamily: Helicellinae
- Tribe: Cernuellini
- Genus: Cernuella; Schlüter, 1838

Type species
- Cochlea virgata Da Costa, 1778

Synonyms
- Cernuella (Cernuella) Schlüter, 1838· accepted, alternate representation; Cernuella (Xeroamanda) Monterosato, 1892· accepted, alternate representation; Cernuella (Xerocincta) Monterosato, 1892· accepted, alternate representation; Xeroampulla Monterosato, 1892; Xerocincta Monterosato, 1892; Xerofusca Monterosato, 1892; Xerolauta Monterosato, 1892; Xerolena Monterosato, 1892; Xerolissa Monterosato, 1892; Xerolutea Monterosato, 1892; Xerotropis Monterosato, 1892; Xerovaria Monterosato, 1892; Xerovera Monterosato, 1892

= Cernuella =

Genus of gastropods

Cernuella is a genus of small air-breathing land snails, pulmonate gastropod mollusks in the family Geomitridae, the hairy snails and their allies.

The native range of the genus is primarily Mediterranean.

Some species such as Cernuella virgata have become significant invasive species, agricultural pests, in parts of Australia.

This same species of the genus has been recovered in archaeological excavations from the Roman Empire occupation of Volubilis, an ancient habitation site in present-day Morocco.

Cernuella snails create and use love darts as part of their courtship and mating behavior.

== Species ==
Species within the genus Cernuella include:

- Cernuella aginnica (Locard, 1882)
- Cernuella amanda (Rossmässler, 1838)
- Cernuella aradasii (Pirajno, 1842)
- Cernuella caruanae (Kobelt, 1888)
- Cernuella cisalpina (Rossmässler, 1837)
- † Cernuella eustrongyla (Bourguignat, 1868)
- Cernuella hydruntina (Kobelt, 1883)
- Cernuella jonica (Mousson, 1854)
- † Cernuella koleensis (Bourguignat, 1862)
- Cernuella lampedusae (Kobelt, 1890)
- Cernuella neglecta (Draparnaud, 1805)
- † Cernuella palaeocastrensis (De Stefani in De Stefani et al., 1891)
- Cernuella rugosa (Lamarck, 1822)
- Cernuella selmaniana Brandt, 1959
- Cernuella tineana (Benoit, 1862)
- Cernuella virgata (Da Costa, 1778)

Synonyms

- Cernuella dobrogica Grossu, 1983: synonym of Cernuella cisalpina (Rossmässler, 1837) (junior synonym)
- Cernuella metabola (Westerlund, 1889): synonym of Theba pisana (O. F. Müller, 1774) (junior synonym)
- Cernuella zilchi Brandt, 1959: synonym of Alteniella zilchi (Brandt, 1959) (original
