= Critical thermal maximum =

Biological measurement in zoology

Critical thermal maximum, in zoology, is the temperature for a given species above which most individuals respond with unorganized locomotion, subjecting the animal to likely death. This concept is particularly relevant in periods of aestivation or quiescence, in which circumstances an organism experiences limited mobility and lacks the ability to seek a microhabitat of reduced thermal stress.

== See also ==
- Aestivation
- Physiology
- Torpor
