= Cernuella aginnica =

Scientific classification
- Kingdom: Animalia
- Phylum: Mollusca
- Class: Gastropoda
- Order: Stylommatophora
- Family: Geomitridae
- Subfamily: Helicellinae
- Tribe: Cernuellini
- Genus: Cernuella
- Species: C. aginnica

Binomial name
- Cernuella aginnica (Locard, 1894

Synonyms
- Cernuella (Cernuella) aginnica (Locard, 1882) · alternate representation; Helix aginnica Locard, 1882 (original combination)

Species of gastropod

Cernuella aginnica is a species of small air-breathing land snail, a terrestrial pulmonate gastropod mollusk in the family Geomitridae.

== Distribution ==
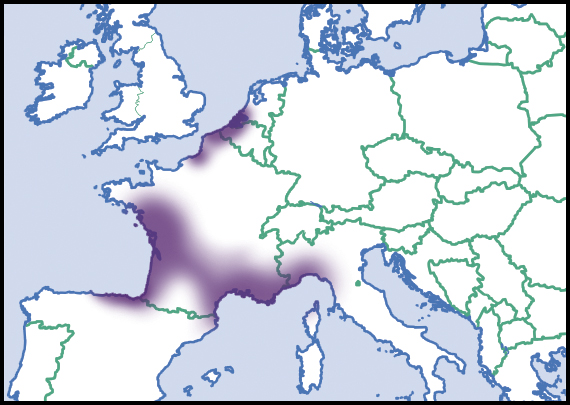
Distribution of Cernuella aginnica

This species is known to occur in a number of countries and islands including:

- Great Britain
- The Netherlands
- France
- Italy
- Gibraltar
- Spain
