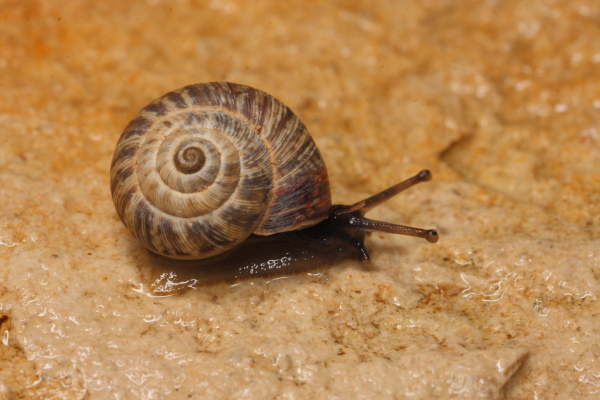

Scientific classification
- Domain: Eukaryota
- Kingdom: Animalia
- Phylum: Mollusca
- Class: Gastropoda
- Order: Stylommatophora
- Family: Geomitridae
- Subfamily: Helicellinae
- Tribe: Cernuellini
- Genus: Cernuella
- Species: C. cisalpina

Binomial name
- Cernuella cisalpina (Rossmässler, 1837)

Synonyms
- Candidula profuga (Rossmässler, 1854) (superseded generic combination); Cernuella (Cernuella) cisalpina (Rossmässler, 1837) · alternate representation; Cernuella dobrogica Grossu, 1983 (junior synonym); Helicella (Candidula) profuga (Rossmässler, 1854) (junior subjective synonym); † Helicella (Candidula) profuga supralevantina Wenz, 1927 (junior subjective synonym); Helix arnusiaca Fagot, 1884 junior subjective synonym; Helix balteata Pollonera, 1892 junior homonym (not G. B. Sowerby I, 1841); Helix brundusiana Fagot, 1884 junior subjective synonym; Helix castertana Bourguignat, 1887 junior subjective synonym; Helix cisalpina Rossmässler, 1837 (original combination); Helix colosseana Fagot, 1884 junior subjective synonym; Helix comnena Retowski, 1889 junior subjective synonym; Helix profuga A. Schmidt, 1854 (junior synonym; replacement name...); Helix tringa Fagot, 1884 (junior synonym)

= Cernuella cisalpina =

Species of gastropod

Cernuella cisalpina, sometimes known as the "maritime gardensnail", is a species of small air-breathing land snail, a terrestrial pulmonate gastropod mollusk in the family Geomitridae.

This is a small snail with a white and brown striped shell.

This species creates and uses love darts as part of its mating behavior.

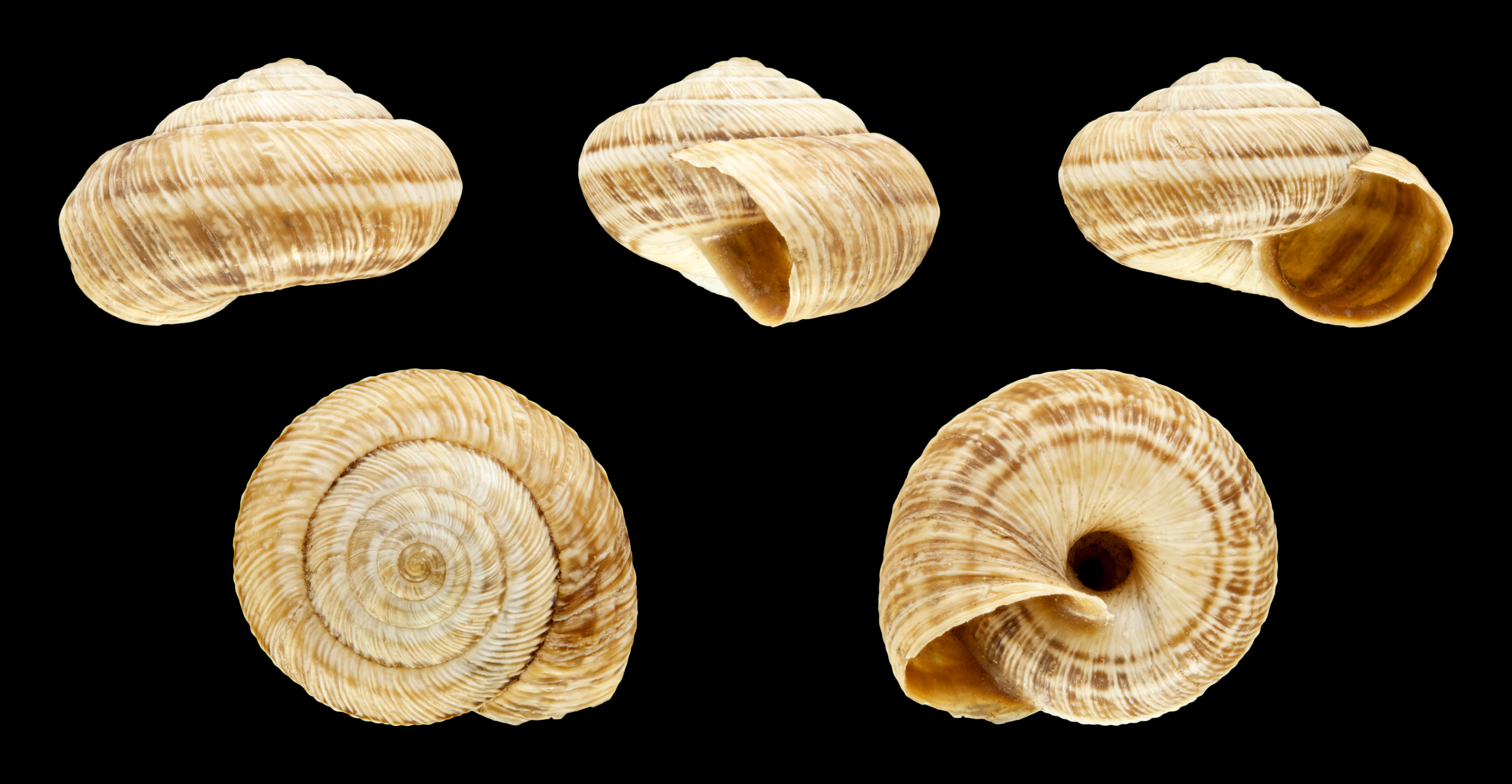
Shell
