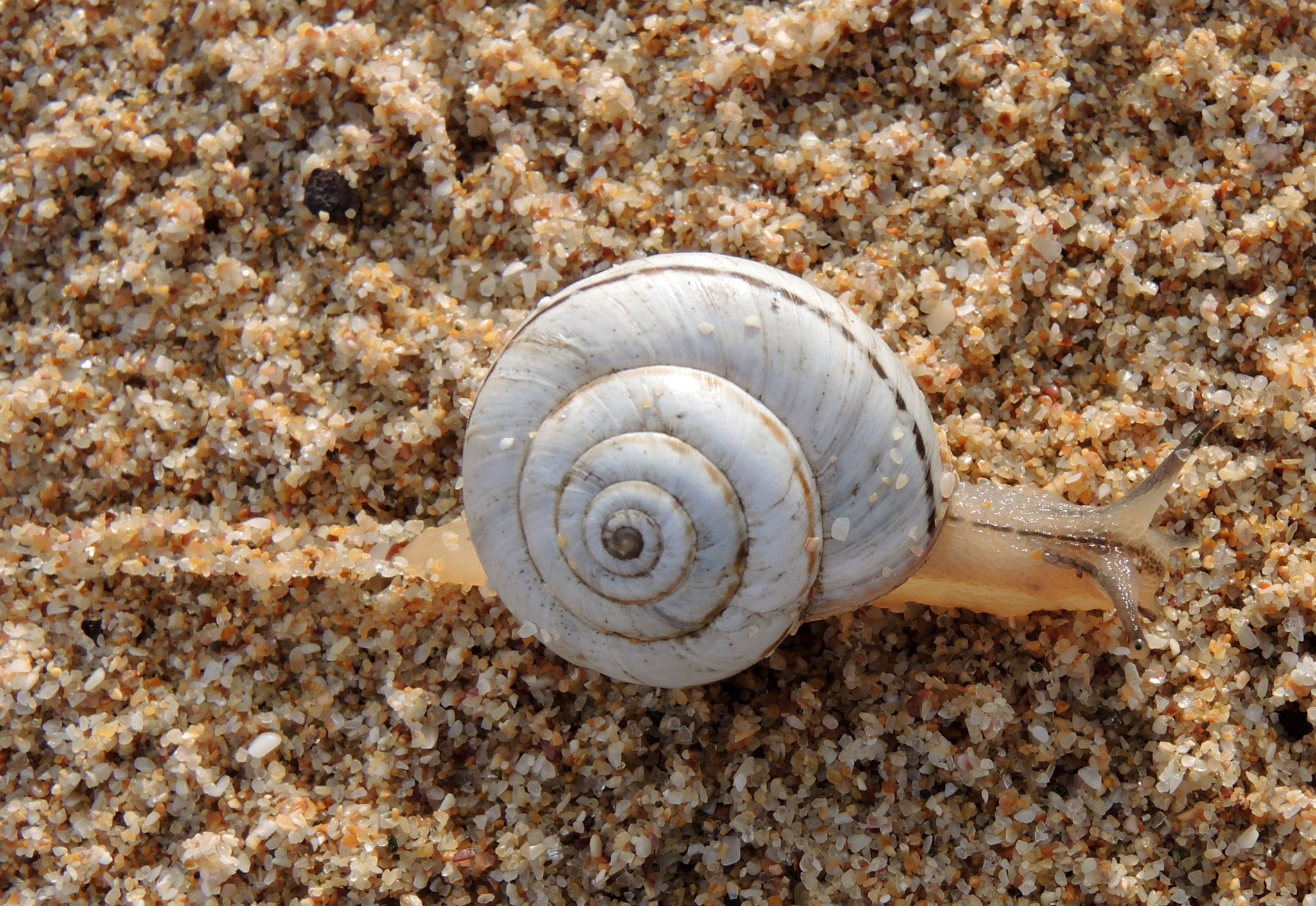

Conservation status
- Secure (NatureServe)

Scientific classification
- Kingdom: Animalia
- Phylum: Mollusca
- Class: Gastropoda
- Order: Stylommatophora
- Family: Geomitridae
- Genus: Cernuella
- Subgenus: Cernuella subg. Cernuella
- Species: C. virgata

Binomial name
- Cernuella virgata (Da Costa, 1778)

Synonyms
- See list

= Cernuella virgata =

Species of gastropod

Cernuella virgata, also known as Helicella virgata and commonly known as the vineyard snail, is a species of small, air-breathing land snail, a pulmonate gastropod mollusc in the family Geomitridae.

This species of snail makes and uses love darts.

== Shell description ==
The shell is from 6 to 19 mm in height and 8 to 25 mm in width.

The coloration of the shell is quite variable, but there is often a creamy-white background, with a variable number of pale to darker brown markings. Some shells are banded at the periphery and on the underside.

== Technical description ==
For terms see gastropod shell

The 15 x 12–23 mm. shell has 4.5–5.5 convex whorls. The last whorl is initially angulated or rounded. The aperture is rounded with a whitish or reddish lip inside and margin is not reflected, The umbilicus is always open, 1/10-1/6 of shell diameter and sometimes slightly excentric. The colour of the periostracum is whitish or yellowish, sometimes with red hue and usually with two brown colour bands on the upper side and 3–4 narrower bands on the lower side, initially finely ribbed, weakly striated at lower whorls.

== Distribution ==
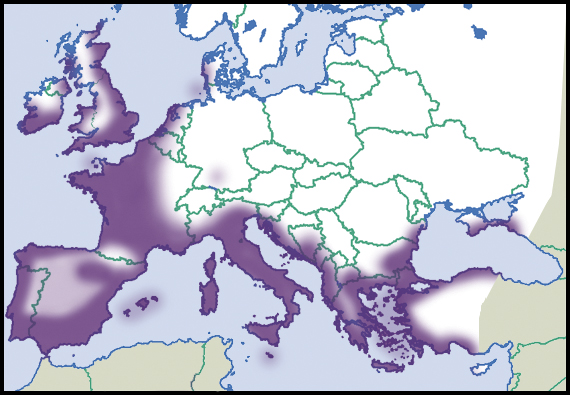
Distribution

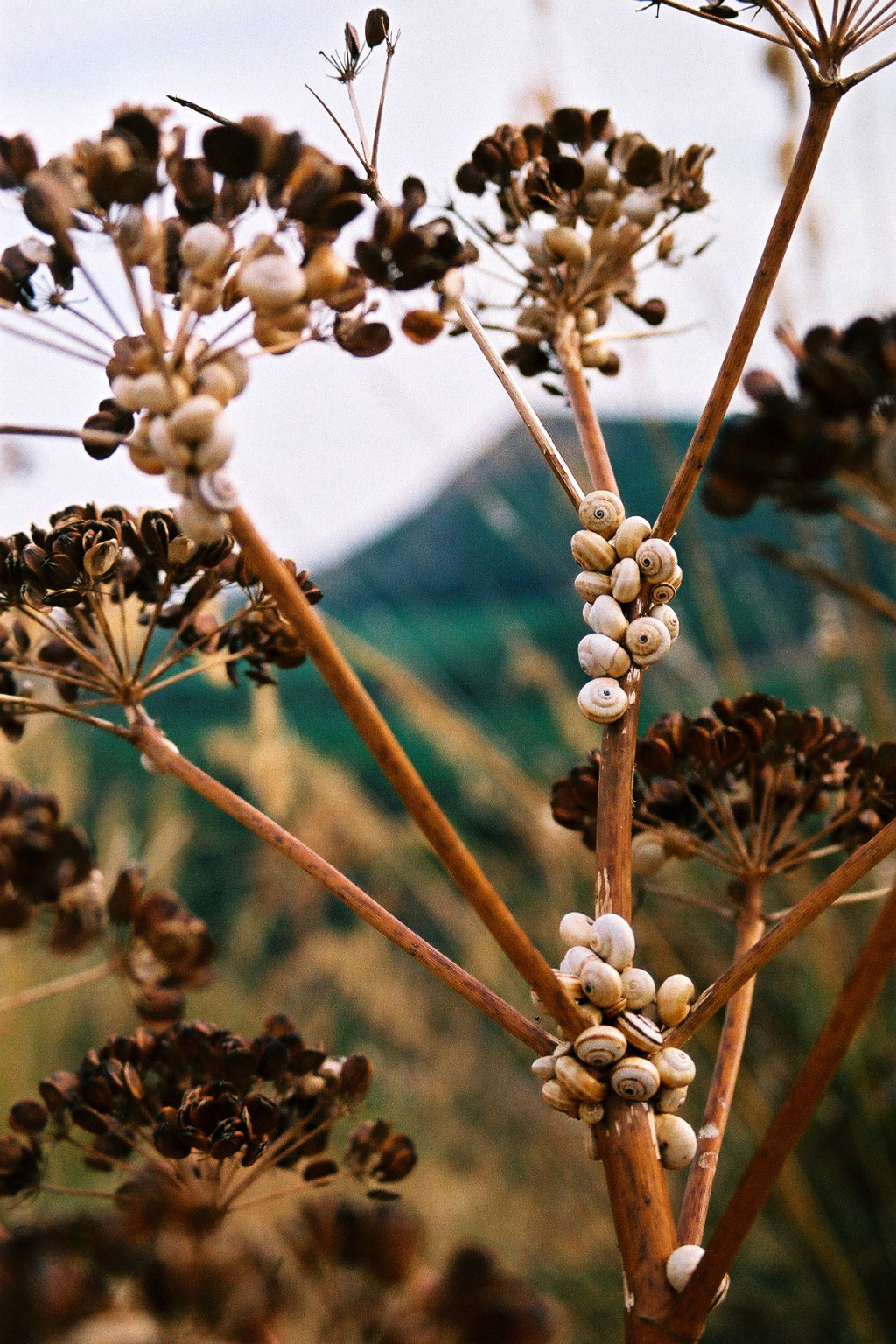
Cernuella virgata estivating on plant stems near the temple of Segesta, Italy

This snail is native to Mediterranean and Western Europe, including the British Isles. This species has been recovered from the Roman occupation of Volubilis, an archaeological site in present-day Morocco.

Cernuella virgata is an invasive species and an agricultural pest in parts of Australia, where it arrived around 1920. In Australia it is known as the common white snail.

Another land snail which is present as an invasive in Australia, and which is sometimes confused with C. virgata is the species Theba pisana. It is somewhat similar in appearance, and lives under similar circumstances. Theba pisana is however a larger species with a more inflated shell, lower spire and a nearly covered umbilicus.

Comparison between shells of C. virgata and T. pisana:

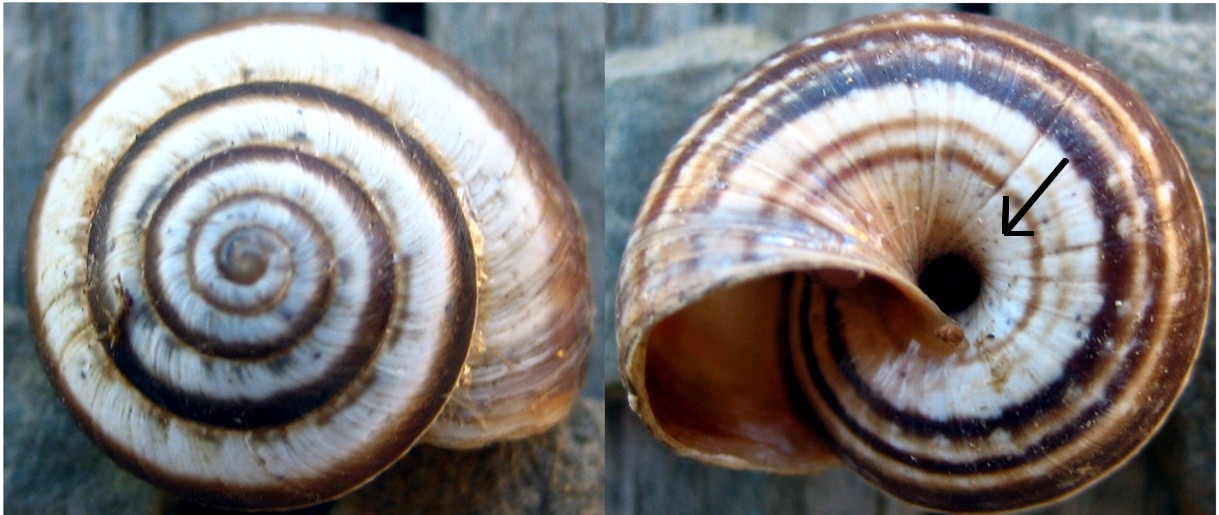
Cernuella virgata, showing the "open" umbilicus

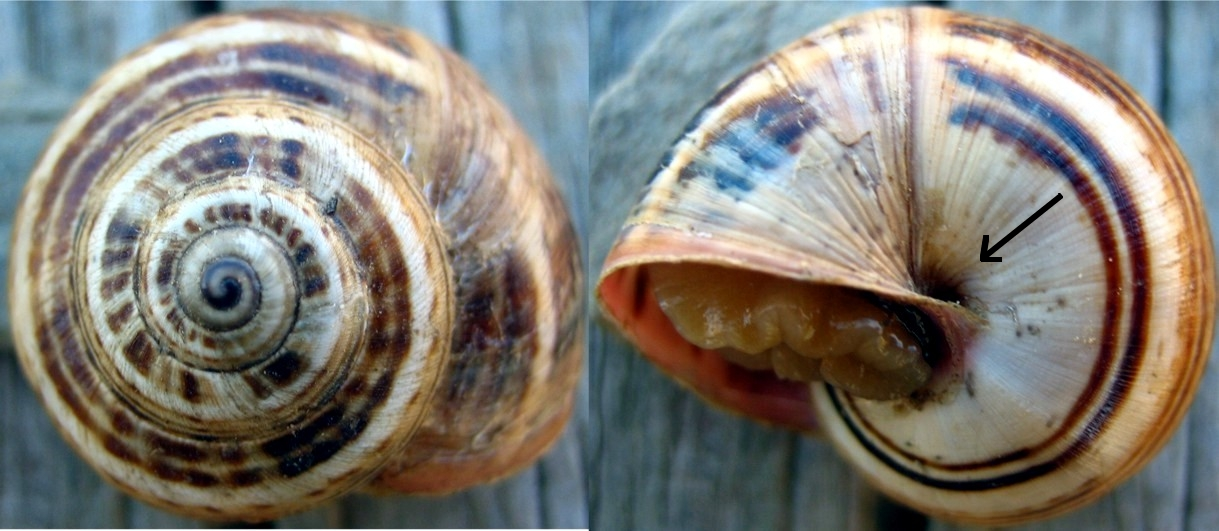
Theba pisana with nearly "closed" umbilicus

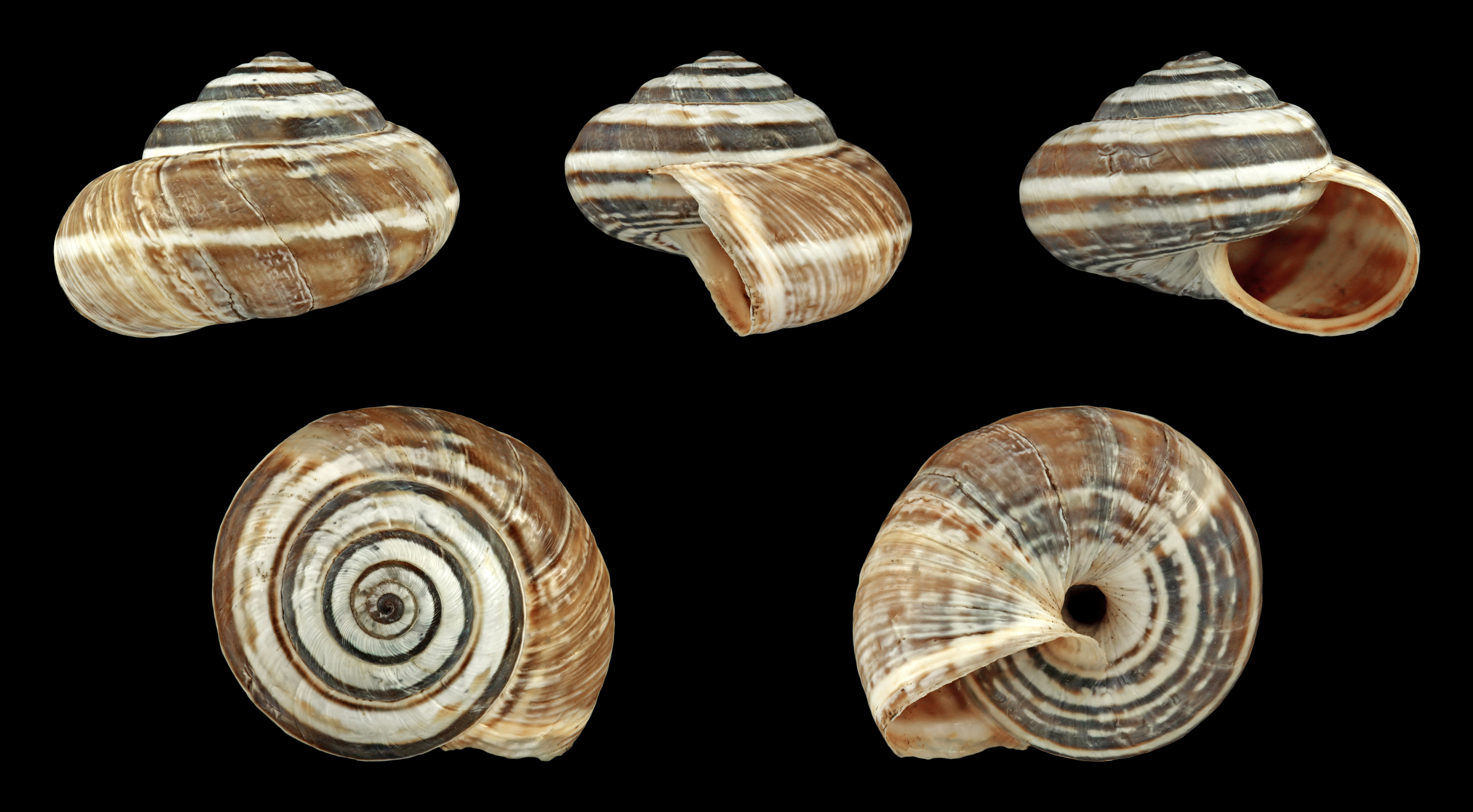
Five views of a shell

== Behavior and human relevance ==
This species aestivates after climbing to the top of vegetation (or fences). This habit is problematic for farmers engaged in crop harvesting, because numerous snails are collected along with the crop.

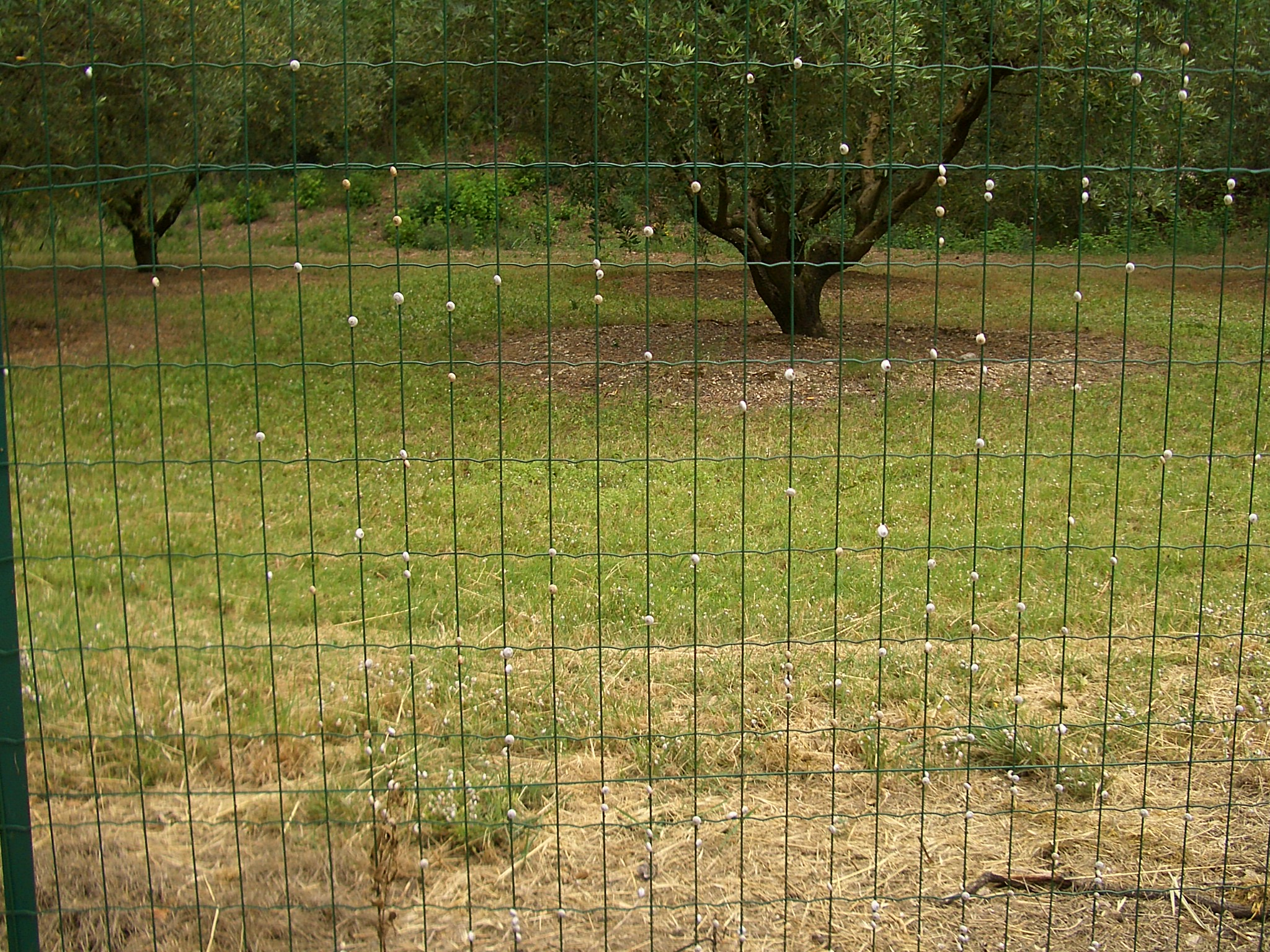
Over a hundred Cernuella virgata on a small section of fence in Provence, France

== Life cycle ==
The size of the egg is 1.5 mm.

== Parasites ==
This species is an intermediate host for the terrestrial trematode parasite Brachylaima cribbi.

== Gastronomy ==
Cernuella virgata, with T. pisana, is consumed in Spain as a "tapa" in the bars, especially in Andalusia, where snails are known as "Chichos" snails.

== Synonyms ==
- Cernuella (Cernuella) virgata (Da Costa, 1778) · alternate representation
- Cochlea virgata Da Costa, 1778 · (original name)
- Helicella (Heliomanes) lineata (Olivi, 1792) · (junior synonym)
- Helicella (Jacosta) jentteri Lindholm, 1926 ·
- Helicella (Xerocincta) neglecta M. R. Alonso, 1975 · (junior synonym)
- Helicella (Xeromagna) submeridionalis M. R. Alonso, 1975 · (junior synonym)
- Helicella virgata (da Costa, 1778) · (superseded generic combination)
- Helix (Helicella) lauta R. T. Lowe, 1831 · (junior synonym)
- Helix (Xerophila) amblia Westerlund, 1893 · (junior synonym)
- Helix (Xerophila) lineata Olivi, 1792 · (superseded combination)
- Helix aglaometa J. Mabille, 1882 · (junior synonym)
- Helix alluvionum Servain, 1880 · (junior synonym)
- Helix aradasii Pirajno, 1842 · (junior synonym)
- Helix blasi Servain, 1880 · (junior synonym)
- Helix canovasiana Servain, 1880 · (junior synonym)
- Helix castroiana Servain, 1880 · (junior synonym)
- Helix edetanorum Servain, 1880 · (junior synonym)
- Helix finitimus Locard, 1899 · (junior synonym)
- Helix grannonensis Bourguignat in Servain, 1880 · (junior synonym)
- Helix hamilcaris Kobelt, 1877 · (junior synonym)
- Helix lineata Olivi, 1792
- Helix lululenta Locard, 1899 · (junior synonym)
- Helix luteata L. Pfeiffer, 1857 · (junior synonym)
- Helix luteola var. minor Servain, 1880 · (junior synonym)
- Helix mendranoi Servain, 1880 · (junior synonym)
- Helix parva L. Pfeiffer, 1848 · (junior synonym)
- Helix phryganophila J. Mabille, 1882 · (junior synonym)
- Helix rufolabris L. Pfeiffer, 1856 · (junior synonym)
- Helix solanoi Servain, 1880 · (junior synonym)
- Helix subluteata Servain, 1880 · (junior synonym)
- Helix tergestina Rossmässler, 1837 · (junior synonym)
- Helix terrosa Locard, 1899 · (junior synonym)
- Helix uberta Locard, 1899 · (junior synonym)
- Helix virgata (da Costa, 1778) · (superseded combination)
- Helix virgata var. alba J. W. Taylor, 1883 · (invalid; name preoccupied)
- Helix virgata var. leucozona J. W. Taylor, 1883 · (invalid; not C. Pfeiffer, 1828)
- Helix virgata var. major J. W. Taylor, 1883 · (invalid; name preoccupied)
- Helix virgata var. minor J. W. Taylor, 1883 · (invalid; name preoccupied)
- Helix xalonica Servain, 1880 · (junior synonym)
- Xerophila virgata (Da Costa, 1778)
- Xerophila virgata croatiae Kormos, 1906 · (suspected synonym)

== See also ==
- Cernuella neglecta
