= Cernuella hydruntina =

Scientific classification
- Kingdom: Animalia
- Phylum: Mollusca
- Class: Gastropoda
- Order: Stylommatophora
- Family: Geomitridae
- Subfamily: Helicellinae
- Tribe: Cernuellini
- Genus: Cernuella
- Species: C. hydruntina

Binomial name
- Cernuella hydruntina (Kobelt, 1884)

Synonyms
- Cernuella (Cernuella) hydruntina (Kobelt, 1883) · alternate representation

Species of gastropod

Cernuella hydruntina is a species of small air-breathing land snail, a terrestrial pulmonate gastropod mollusk in the family Geomitridae.

This species creates and uses love darts in its mating behavior.

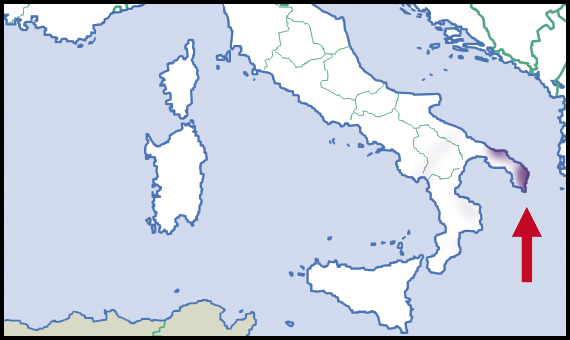
distribution
