= Aestivation =

State of animal or plant dormancy in the summer

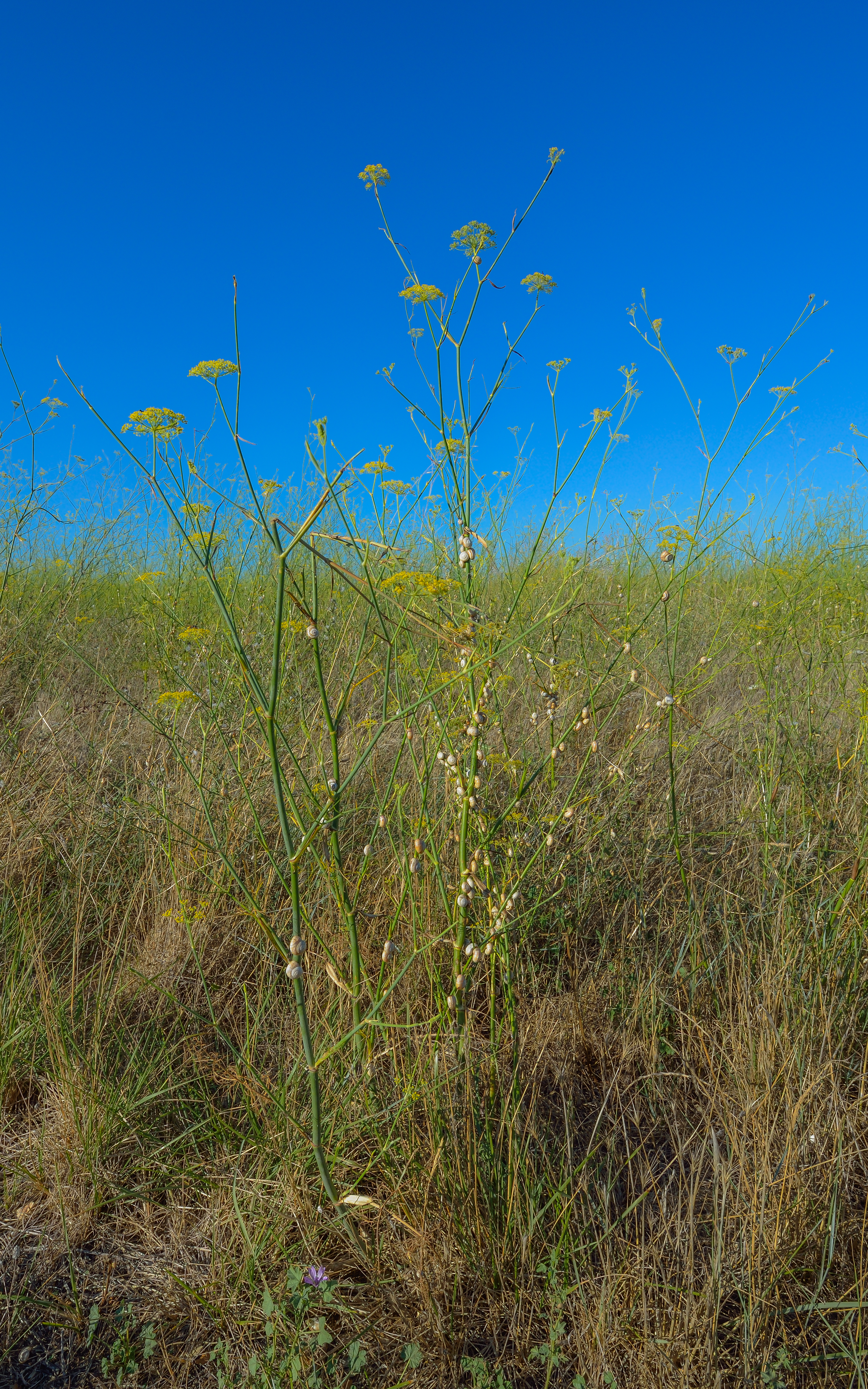
Theba pisana snails aestivating on Foeniculum vulgare in Montbazin, France

Aestivation (Latin: aestas (summer); also estivation in American English) is a state of animal or plant dormancy, similar to hibernation, although taking place in the summer rather than the winter. Aestivation is characterized by inactivity and a lowered metabolic rate, that is entered in response to high temperatures and arid conditions. It takes place during times of heat and dryness, which are often the summer months.

Invertebrate and vertebrate animals enter an aestivating state to avoid damage from high temperatures and the risk of desiccation. Both land-dwelling and aquatic animals undergo aestivation, as do many plants, such as Cyclamen, which have foliage and flowers in the winter, and become dormant in the summer. Fossil records suggest that aestivation may have evolved several hundred million years ago.

== Physiology ==
Organisms that aestivate appear to be in a fairly "light" state of dormancy, as their physiological state can be rapidly reversed, and the organism can quickly return to a normal state.

The primary physiological and biochemical concerns for an aestivating animal are to conserve energy, retain water in the body, ration the use of stored energy, handle the nitrogenous end products, and stabilize bodily organs, cells, and macromolecules. This can be quite a task as hot temperatures and arid conditions may last for months, in some cases for years. The depression of metabolic rate during aestivation causes a reduction in macromolecule synthesis and degradation. To stabilise the macromolecules, aestivators will enhance antioxidant defenses and elevate chaperone proteins. This is a widely used strategy across all forms of hypometabolism. These physiological and biochemical concerns appear to be the core elements of hypometabolism throughout the animal kingdom. In other words, animals which aestivate appear to go through nearly the same physiological processes as animals that hibernate.

== Plants ==
Aestivation is common in plants, particularly among autumn, winter, or early spring flowering bulb-producing plants like snowdrops and daffodils, and tuberous plants like cyclamens, in areas with Mediterranean climates; these all become dormant during the hot, dry summers characteristic of this climate.

== Invertebrates ==
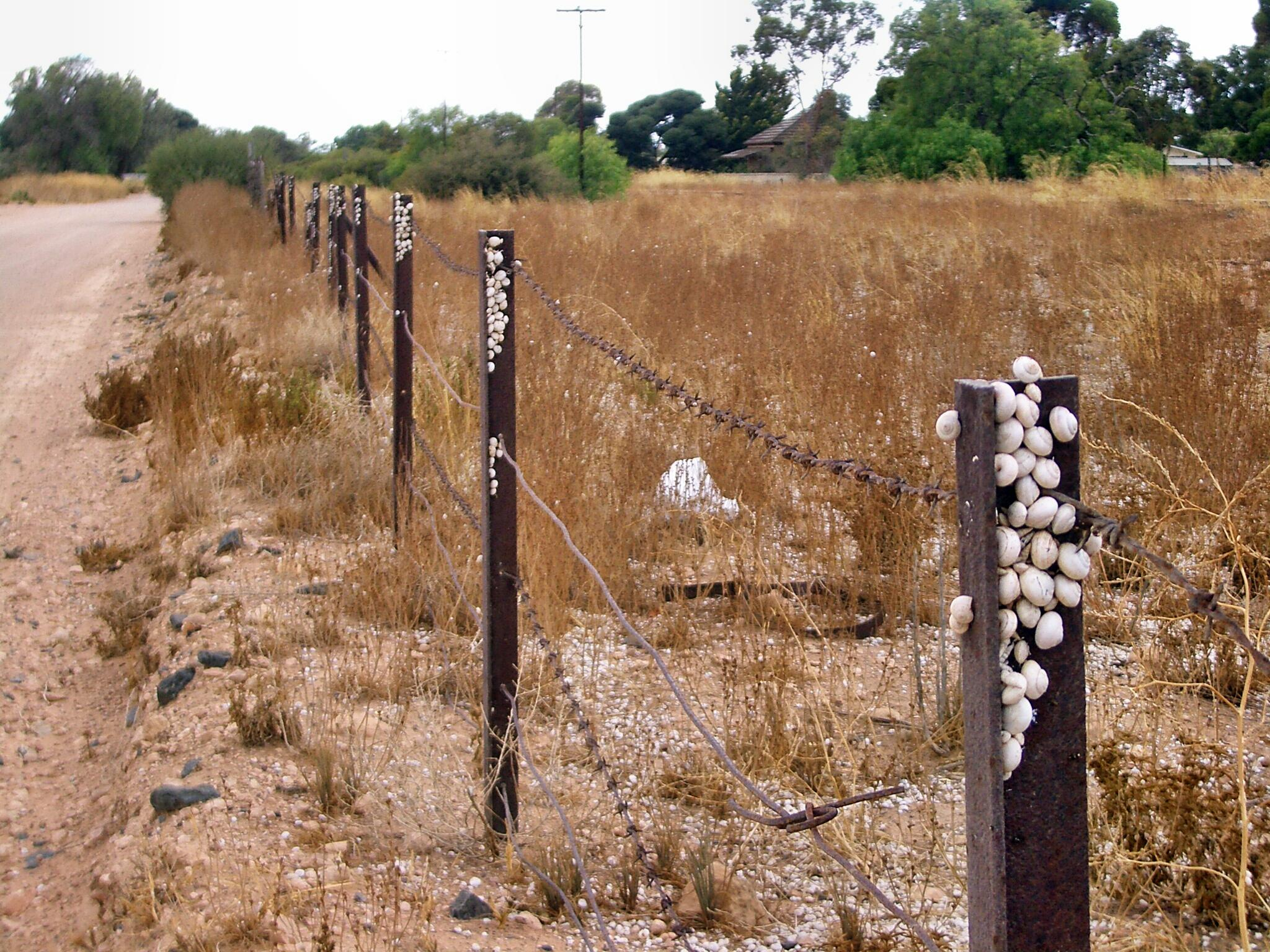
Introduced Theba pisana snails aestivating on a row of fence posts in Kadina, South Australia

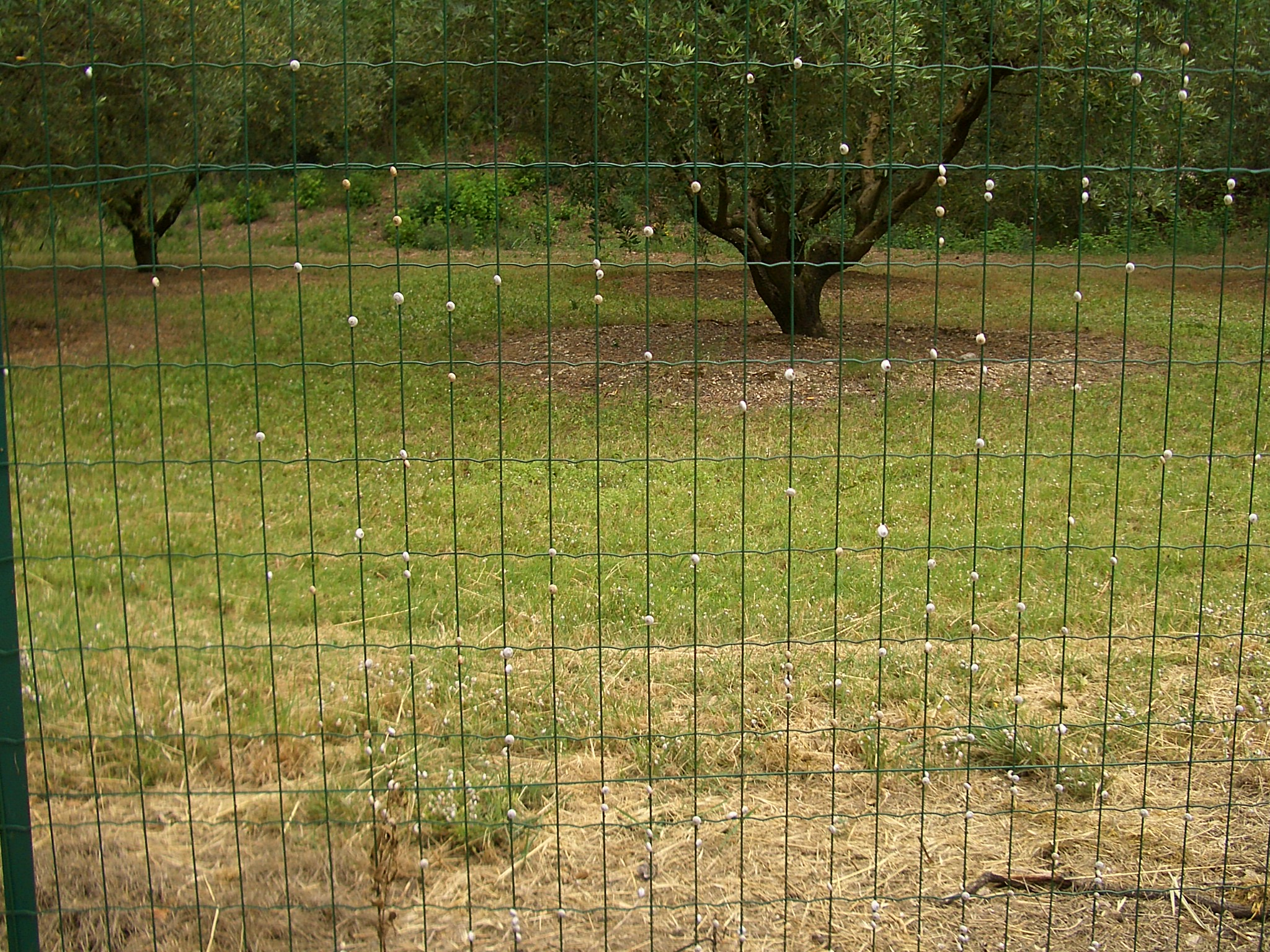
Numerous individuals of the snail Cernuella virgata aestivating on a wire fence near Glanum, in the south of France.

=== Mollusca ===
Some air-breathing land snails, including species in the genera Helix, Cernuella, Theba, Helicella, Achatina and Otala, commonly aestivate during periods of heat. Some species move into shaded vegetation or rubble. Others climb up tall plants, including crop species as well as bushes and trees, and will also climb human-made structures such as posts, fences, etc.

Their habit of climbing vegetation to aestivate has caused more than one introduced snail species to be declared an agricultural nuisance.

To seal the opening to their shell to prevent water loss, pulmonate land snails secrete a membrane of dried mucus called an epiphragm. In certain species, such as Helix pomatia, this barrier is reinforced with calcium carbonate, and thus it superficially resembles an operculum, except that it has a tiny hole to allow some oxygen exchange.

There is a decrease in metabolic rate and reduced rate of water loss in aestivating snails like Rhagada tescorum, Sphincterochila boissieri and others.

=== Arthropoda ===
Lady beetles (Coccinellidae) aestivate. Another type of beetle (Blepharida rhois) also aestivates. They usually do so when the temperature is warmer and will re-emerge in the late summer or early fall. Mosquitoes also are reported to undergo aestivation. False honey ants are well known for being winter active and aestivate in temperate climates. Bogong moths will aestivate over the summer to avoid the heat and lack of food sources. Adult alfalfa weevils (Hypera postica) aestivate during the summer in the southeastern United States, during which their metabolism, respiration, and nervous systems show a dampening of activity.

An example of a crustacean undergoing aestivation is with the Australian crab Austrothelphusa transversa, which undergoes aestivation underground during the dry season.

== Vertebrates ==
=== Reptiles and amphibians ===
Aestivation has been put forward as the most likely explanation why this therapsid cynodont Thrinaxodon liorhinus shared its burrow with a temnospondyl amphibian, Broomistega putterilli.

Non-mammalian vertebrates that aestivate include North American desert tortoises, crocodiles, and salamanders. Some amphibians (e.g. the cane toad and greater siren) aestivate during the hot dry season by moving underground where it is cooler and more humid. The California red-legged frog may aestivate to conserve energy when its food and water supply is low.

The water-holding frog has an aestivation cycle. It buries itself in sandy ground in a secreted, water-tight mucus cocoon during periods of hot, dry weather. Australian Aboriginals discovered a means to take advantage of this by digging up one of these frogs and squeezing it, causing the frog to empty its bladder. This dilute urine—up to half a glassful—can be drunk. However, this will cause the death of the frog which will be unable to survive until the next rainy season without the water it had stored.

The western swamp turtle aestivates to survive hot summers in the ephemeral swamps it lives in. It buries itself in various media which change depending on location and available substrates.

=== Fish ===
African lungfish aestivate, as can salamanderfish.

=== Mammals ===
Although relatively uncommon, a small number of mammals aestivate. Animal physiologist Kathrin Dausmann of Philipps University of Marburg, Germany, and coworkers presented evidence in a 2004 edition of Nature that the Malagasy fat-tailed dwarf lemur hibernates or aestivates in a small tree hole for seven months of the year. According to the Oakland Zoo in California, four-toed hedgehogs are thought to aestivate during the dry season.

== See also ==
- Critical thermal maximum
- Hibernation induction trigger
- Siesta
- Torpor
- Splooting
