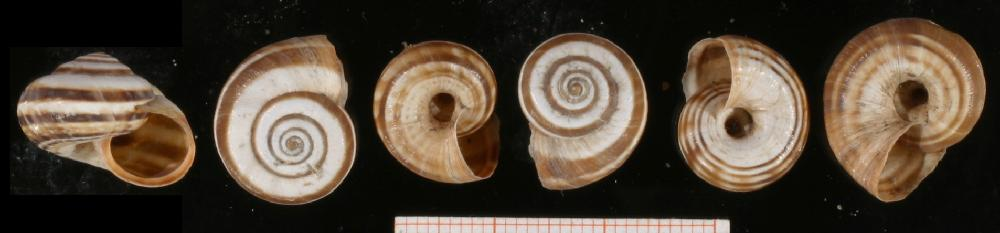
- Cernuella neglecta shells

Conservation status
- Least Concern (IUCN 3.1)

Scientific classification
- Kingdom: Animalia
- Phylum: Mollusca
- Class: Gastropoda
- Order: Stylommatophora
- Family: Geomitridae
- Genus: Cernuella
- Species: C. neglecta

Binomial name
- Cernuella neglecta (Draparnaud, 1805)

Synonyms
- Cernuella (Xerocincta) neglecta (Draparnaud, 1805)· accepted, alternate representation; Helicella (Xerocincta) ammonis (Strobel, 1857) (junior synonym); Helicella (Xerocincta) ammonis acrenoica Haas, 1936 (junior synonym); Helix (Xerophila) neglecta Draparnaud, 1805 (superseded combination); Helix ammonis Strobel, 1857(junior synonym); Helix bononiensis De Stefani, 1883 (junior synonym); Helix discrepans Tiberi, 1878 (invalid; not L. Pfeiffer, 1863); Helix mendica Pollonera, 1892 (invalid; not Slavík, 1869); Helix neglecta Draparnaud, 1805 (original combination); Helix nerusia Pollonera, 1892 (junior synonym); Helix samnitum Westerlund, 1889 (junior synonym); Helix trepidulina Pollonera, 1892 (junior synonym); Xerocincta neglecta (Draparnaud, 1805) (superseded combination)

= Cernuella neglecta =

Species of gastropod

Cernuella neglecta, the dune snail, is a species of small air-breathing land snail, a terrestrial pulmonate gastropod mollusc in the family Geomitridae.

This is a small snail with a white and brown striped shell. It lives on chalk banks.

== Distribution and conservation status ==
This species is listed in IUCN red list - Least concern (LC)

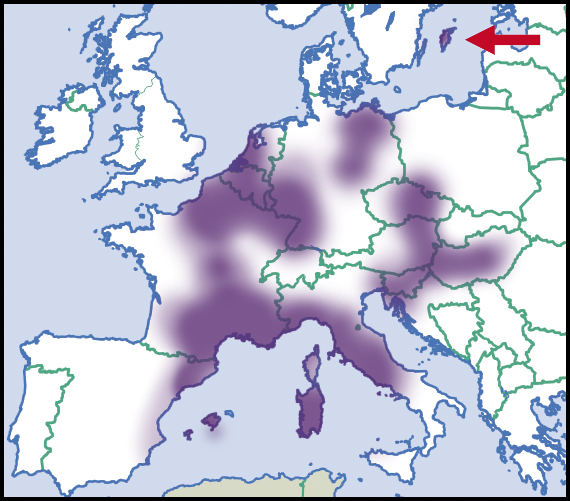
Distribution

This snail lives in European countries and islands including:

- Czech Republic - Bohemia
- Great Britain - extirpated
- Netherlands
- Poland
- Spain
