= Brachylaimidae =

Scientific classification
- Kingdom: Animalia
- Phylum: Platyhelminthes
- Class: Trematoda
- Order: Diplostomida
- Suborder: Diplostomata
- Superfamily: Brachylaimoidea
- Family: Brachylaimidae; Joyeux & Foley, 1930

Genera
- Brachylaima Dujardin, 1843; Glaphyrostomum Braun, 1901

Family of worms

Brachylaimidae is a family of parasitic flukes in the sub-class Digenea. Adults are usually found within the digestive tracts and other organs of mammals or birds and have a complex three-stage life cycle.

== Characteristics ==
The adult body is elongate or occasionally oval or subglobular, sometimes with fine spines. The suckers are well-developed and usually at the anterior end. There is usually a prepharynx, the pharynx is muscular, the oesophagus, if present, is short and the caeca long, terminating near the posterior end. The gonads are posterior to the ventral sucker and the genital pore opens on the ventral surface.

== Hosts ==
Adult flukes in this family are found in mammals, birds and occasionally amphibians. There are two intermediate hosts, both terrestrial molluscs. The cercariae leave the first intermediate host with easily shed, rudimentary tails and the metacercariae in the second intermediate host may or may not be encysted.
