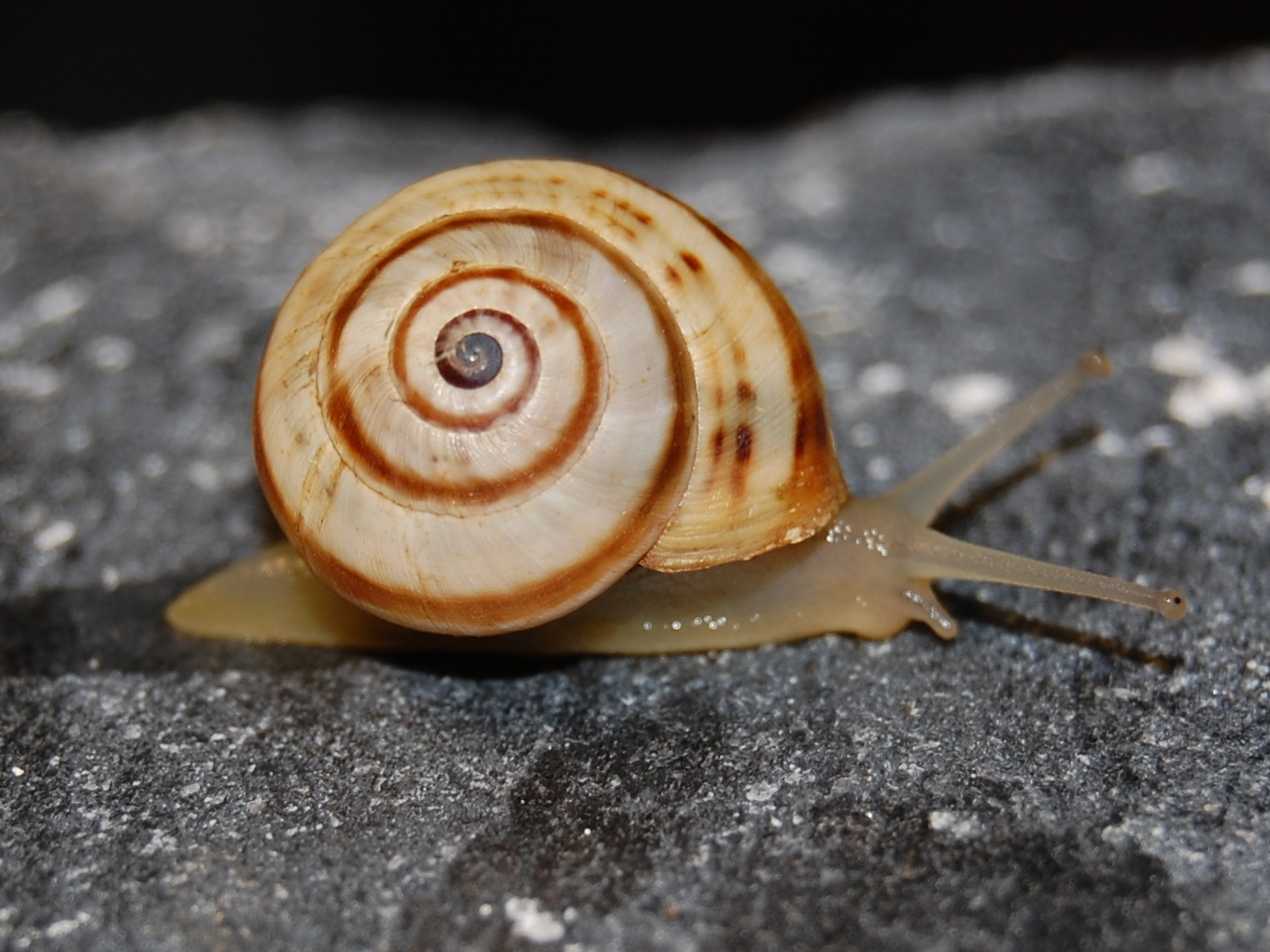
- A live and active individual of Theba pisana

Conservation status
- Least Concern (IUCN 3.1)

- Secure (NatureServe)

Scientific classification
- Kingdom: Animalia
- Phylum: Mollusca
- Class: Gastropoda
- Order: Stylommatophora
- Family: Helicidae
- Genus: Theba
- Species: T. pisana

Binomial name
- Theba pisana (Müller, 1774)

Synonyms
- Helix Albella Linnaeus, 1758; Helix pisana Müller, 1774; Eupharypha pisana (Müller)

= Theba pisana =

Species of gastropod

Theba pisana, common names the white garden snail, sand hill snail, white Italian snail, Mediterranean coastal snail, and simply just the Mediterranean snail, is an edible species of medium-sized, air-breathing land snail, a terrestrial pulmonate gastropod mollusk in the family Helicidae, the typical snails.

This species is native to the Mediterranean region, but it has become an invasive species in many other countries. Theba pisana is a well-known agricultural pest in numerous parts of the world. The shell color varies from white to yellow-brown with light brown spiral markings.

== Distribution ==
The species is native to the Mediterranean region. The type locality is Italy.

The distribution of T. pisana includes the Mediterranean region and adjacent Atlantic coasts from central Morocco to north western Europe:

- Morocco
- Portugal
- In Spain occasionally also in the interior. It is introduced to Menorca. - A subspecies, T. pisana arietina, from coastal habitats in Spain and Portugal, is on the Red List as Endangered.
- Italy
- Malta
- Greece
- Israel
- Egypt
- Algeria
- Belgium
- Central Atlantic islands

The species has been introduced to numerous other areas, including:

- southwestern England and south Wales, Great Britain: - introduced since at least the 1700s
- eastern and southern Ireland - introduced since at least the 1700s and it is still spreading along frost-free coastal localities.
- Netherlands - non-indigenous
- the United States in California
- parts of Africa
- Asia
- southeastern Australia, southwestern Australia and Tasmania
- South Africa - It was introduced into South Africa prior to 1881. It has invaded the fynbos biome in South Africa. Given the very high densities that T. pisana can attain at some sites, plus their apparently not particular feeding habits, their potential impact on the vegetation is cause for concern and should be further investigated.

In many of these places T. pisana has become a problematic invasive species and a serious agricultural pest.

This species is already established in the US, and is considered to represent a potentially serious threat as a pest, an invasive species which could negatively affect agriculture, natural ecosystems, human health or commerce. Therefore, it has been suggested that this species be given top national quarantine significance in the USA.

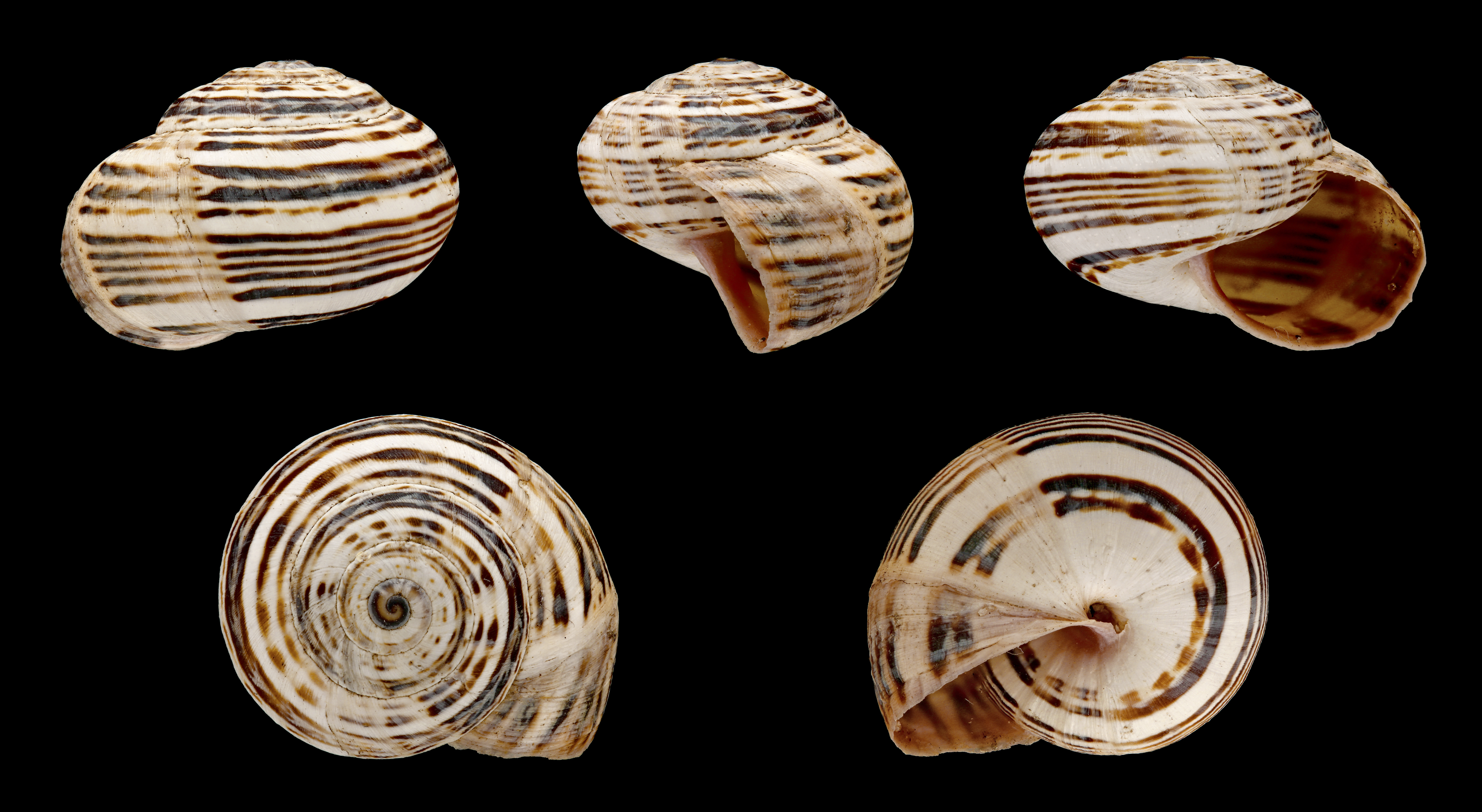
Theba pisana pisana

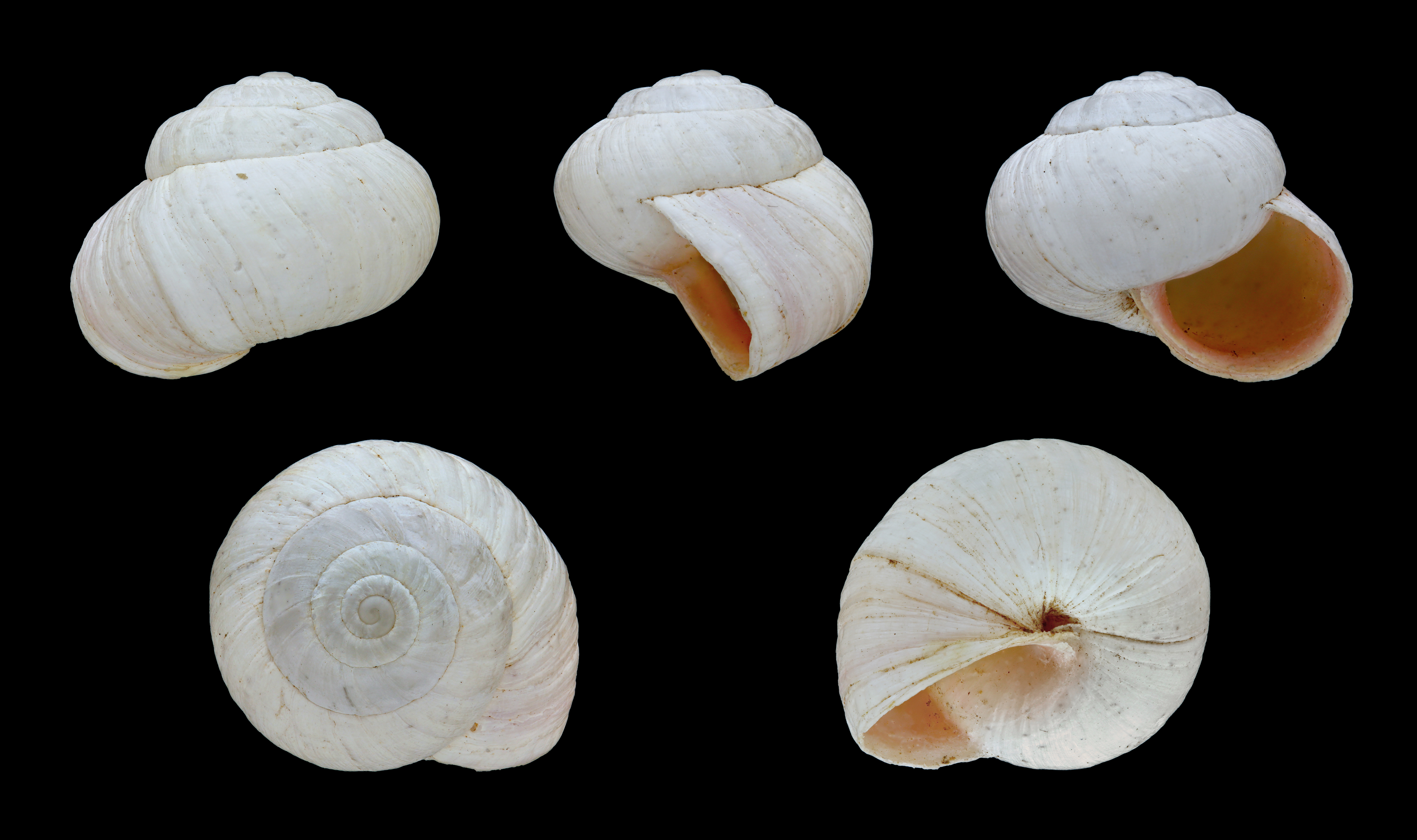
Theba pisana pisana

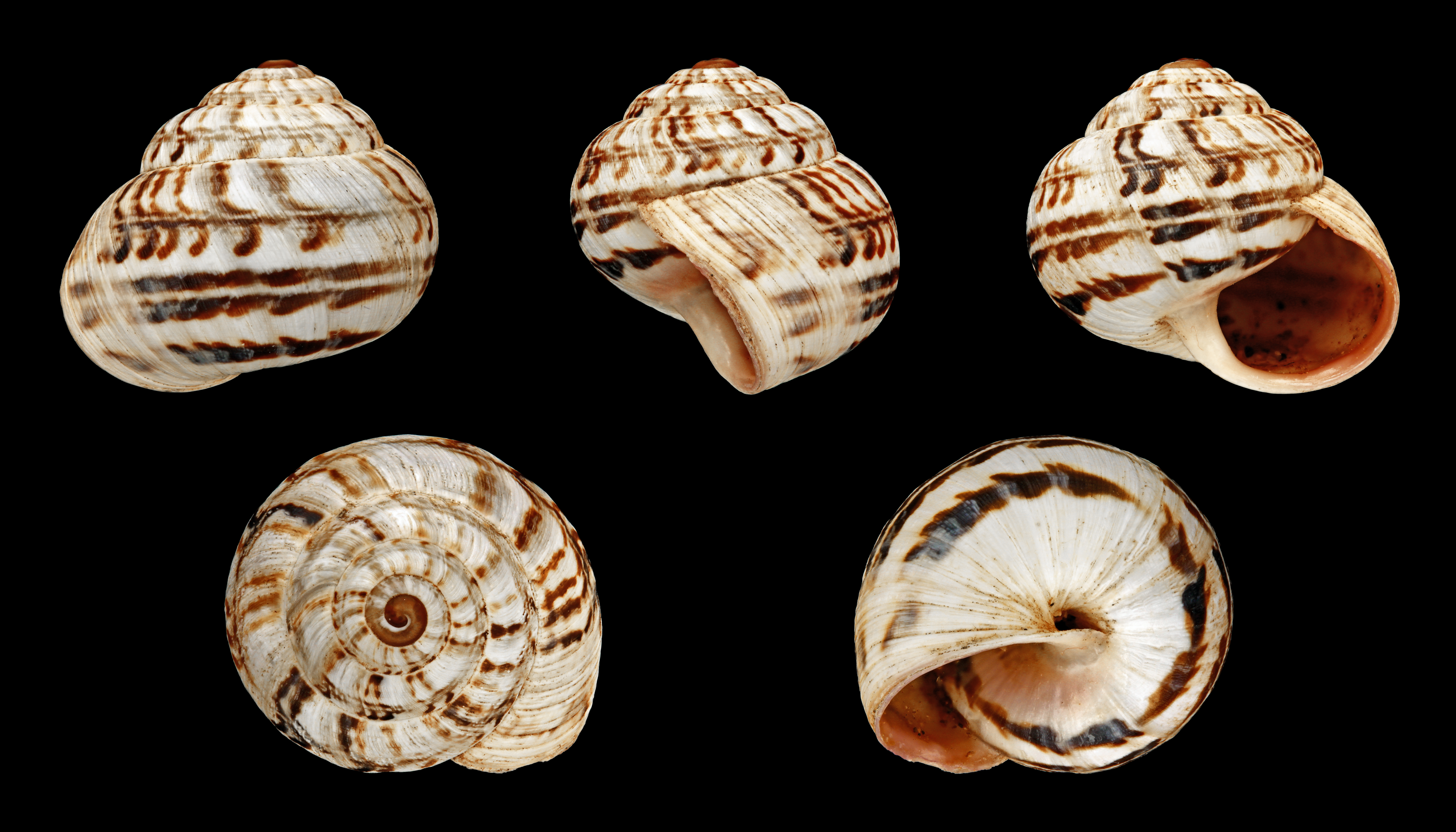
Theba pisana ampullacea

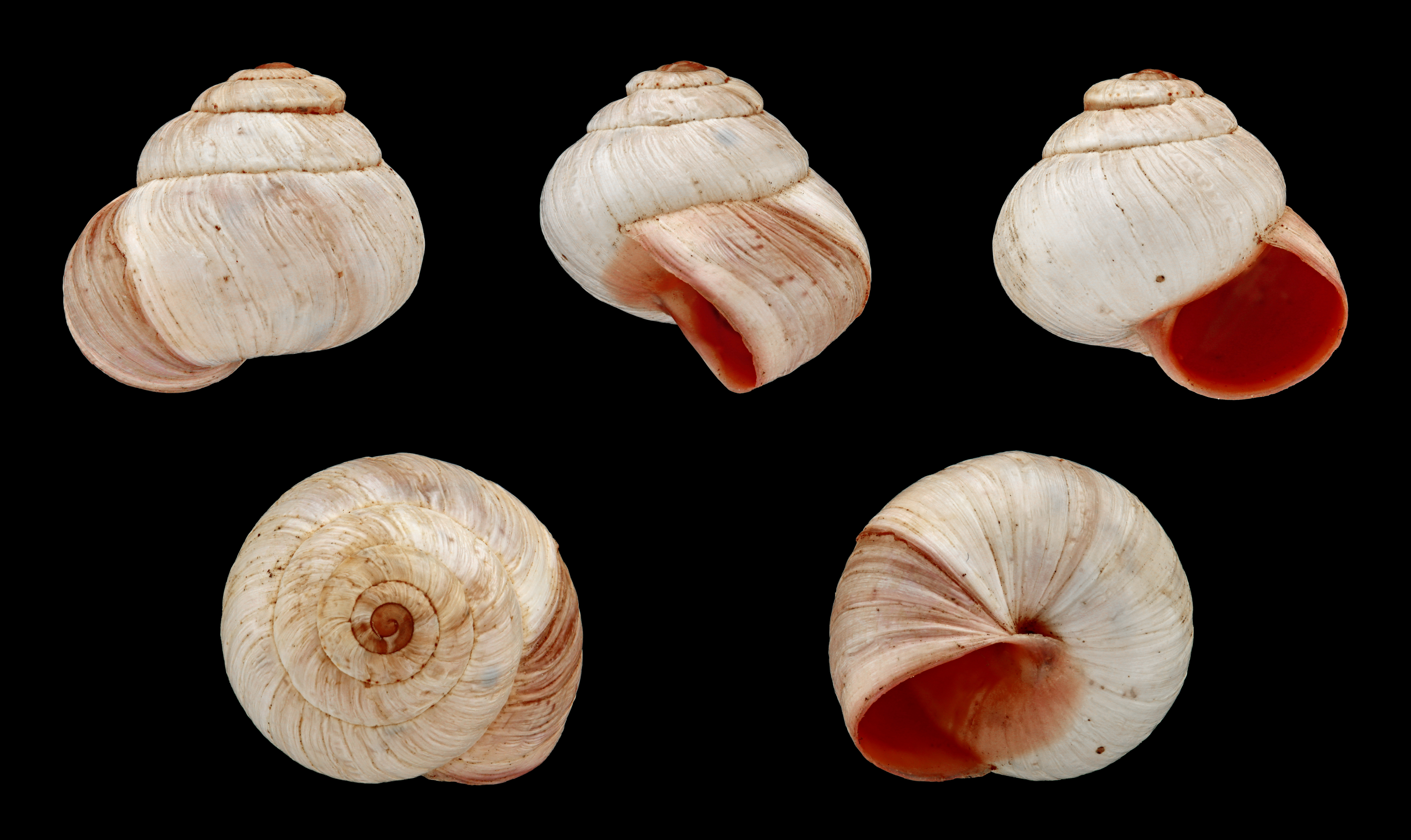
Theba pisana ampullacea

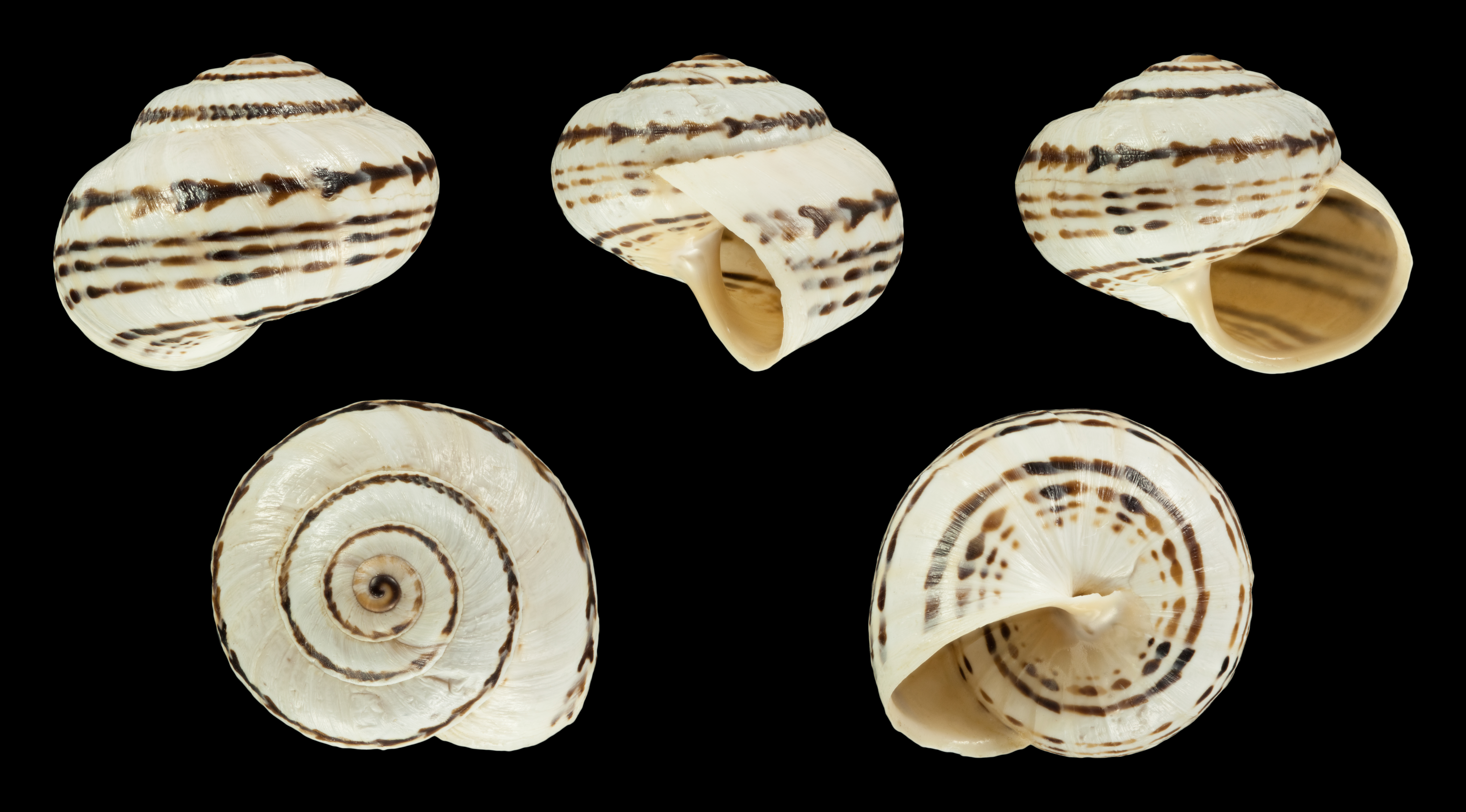
Theba pisana carpiensis

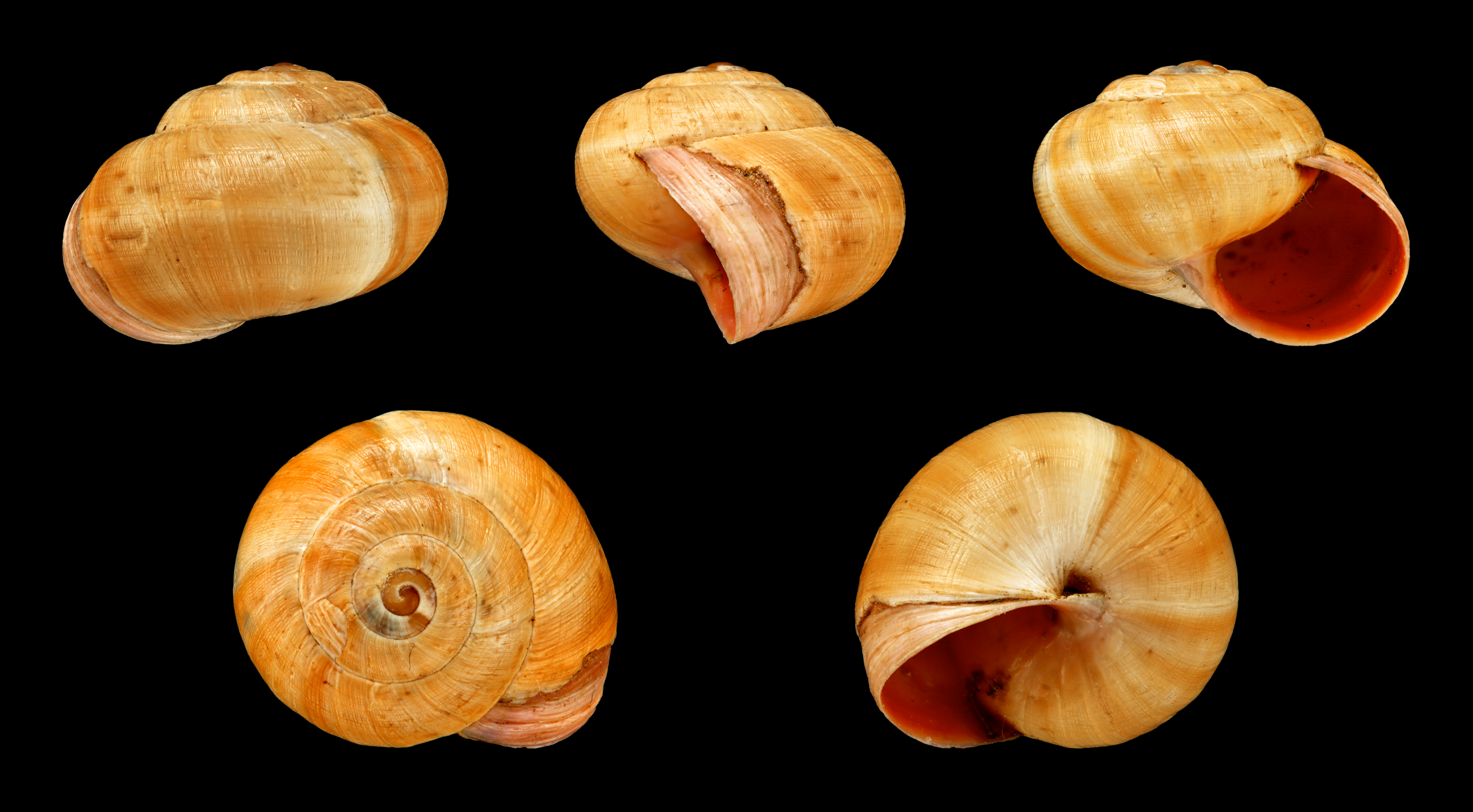
Theba pisana concolor

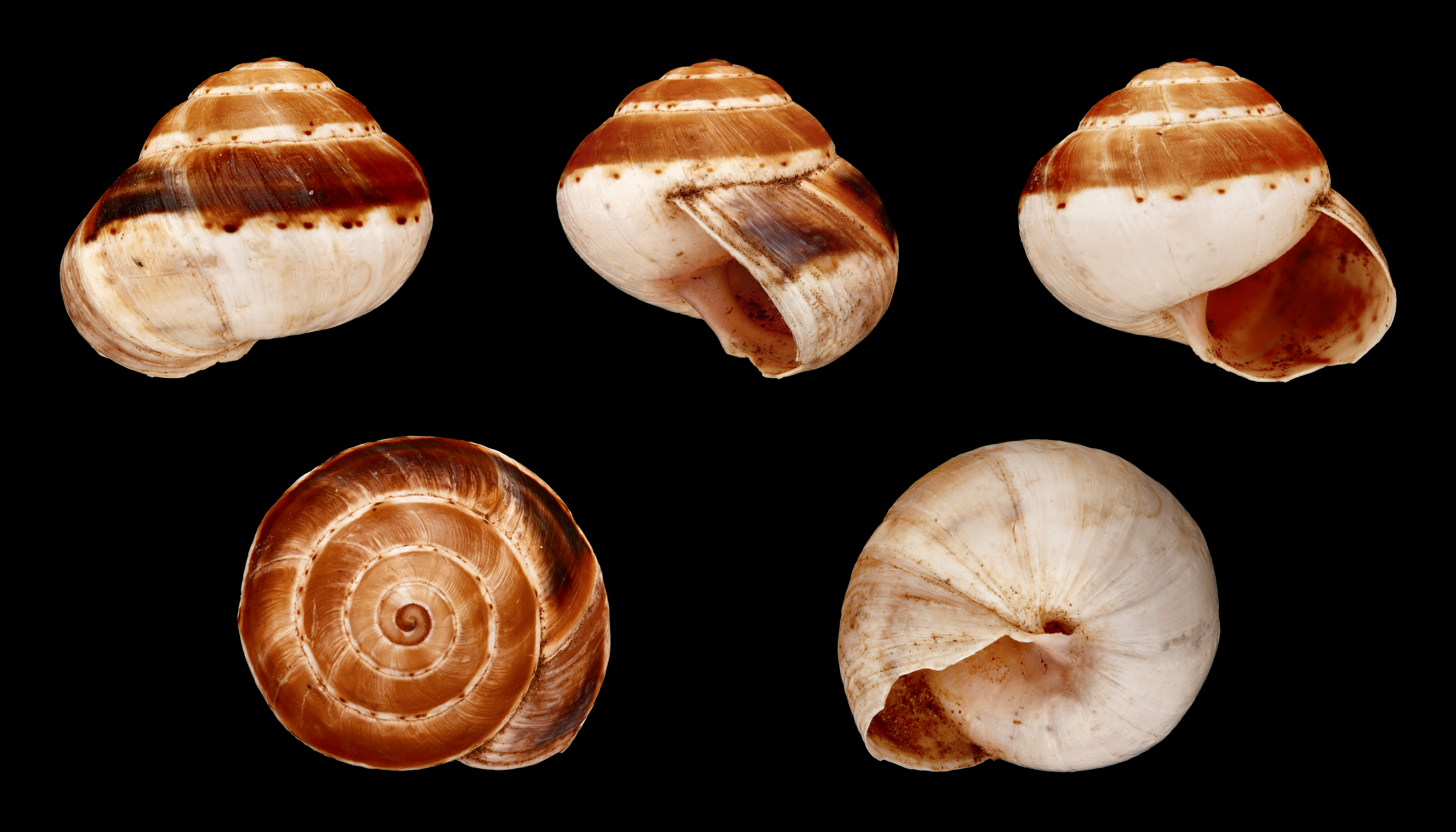
Theba pisana dermoi

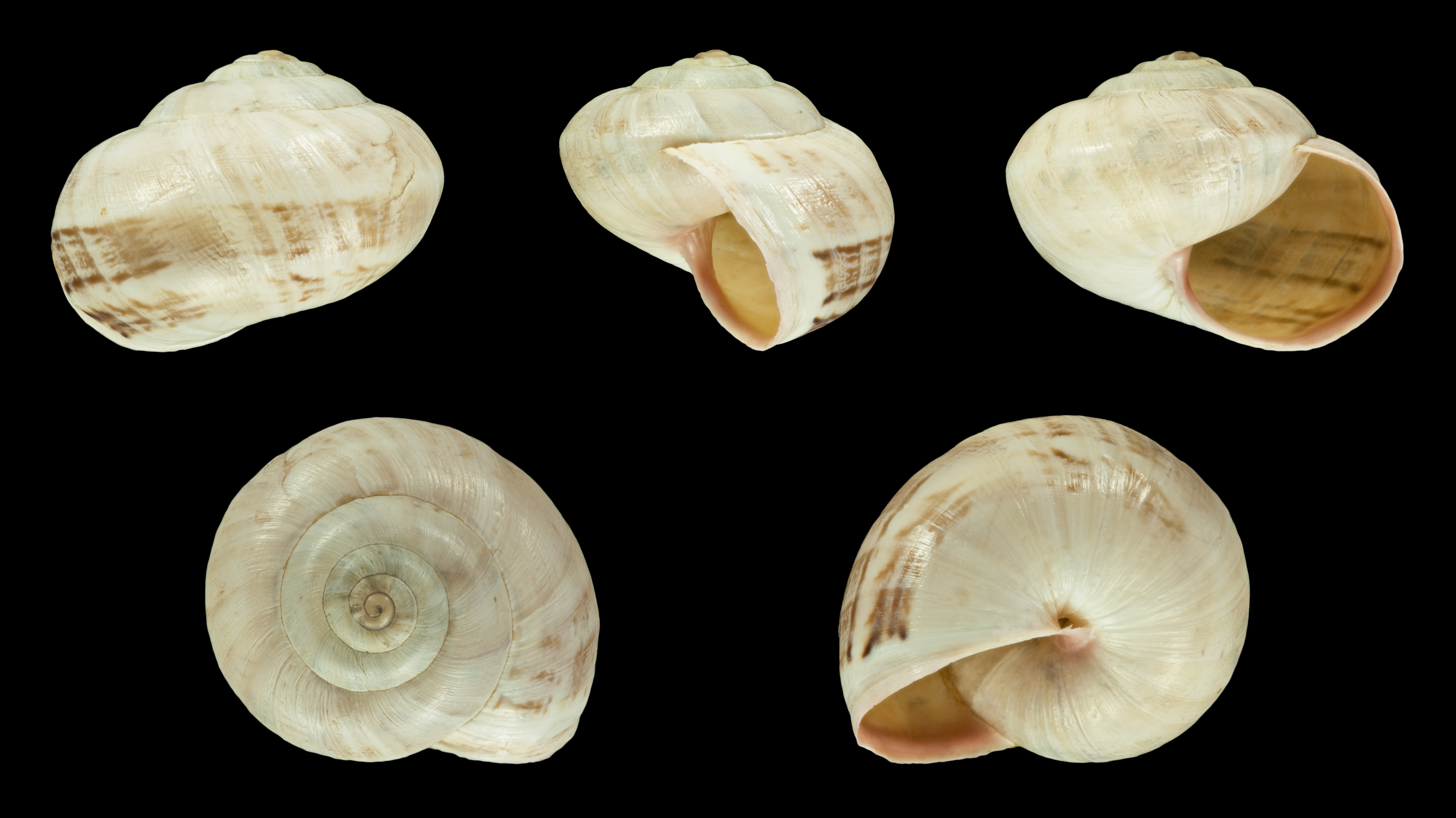
Theba pisana fauxrosea

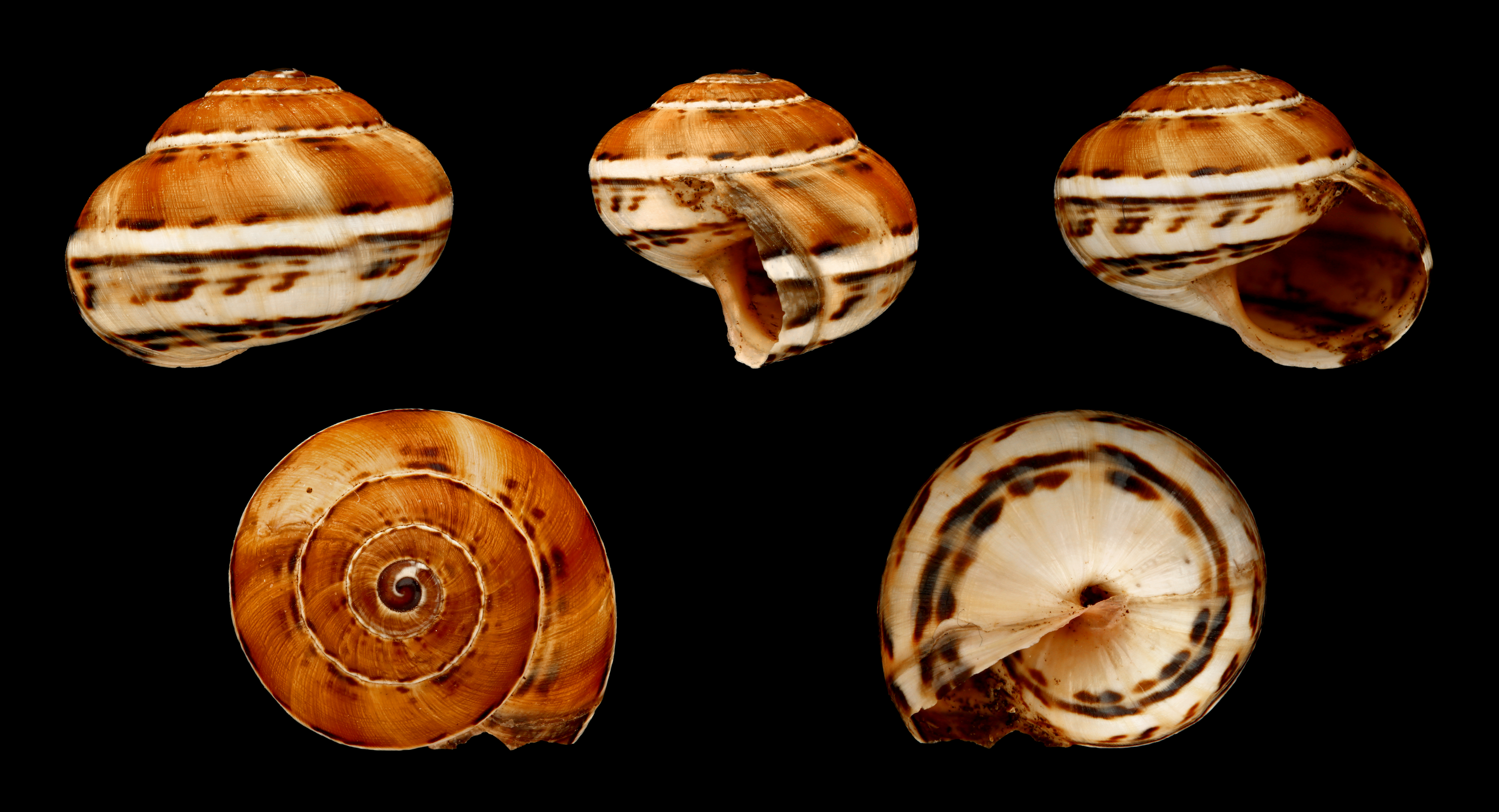
Theba pisana ferruginea

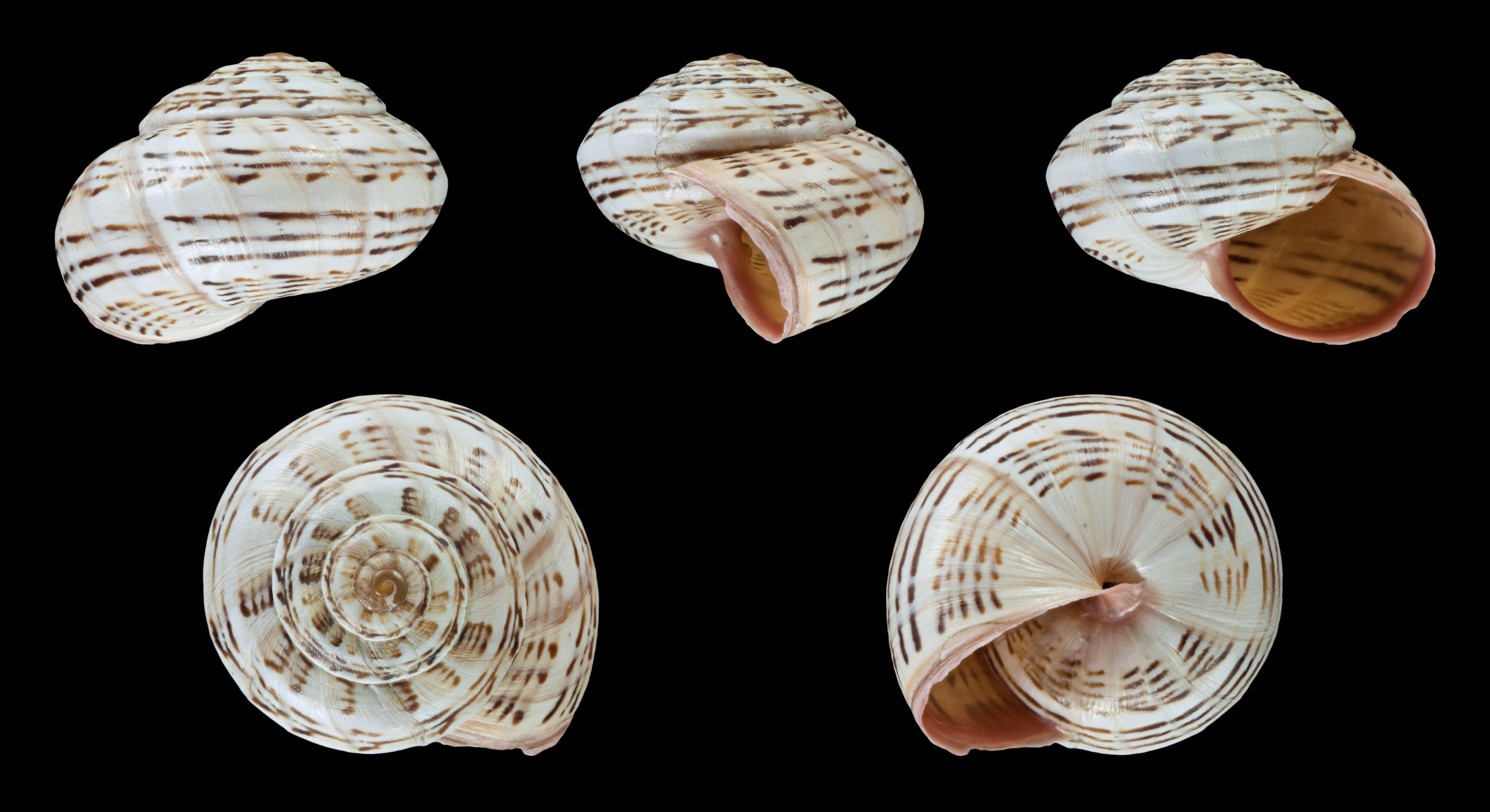
Theba pisana lineolata

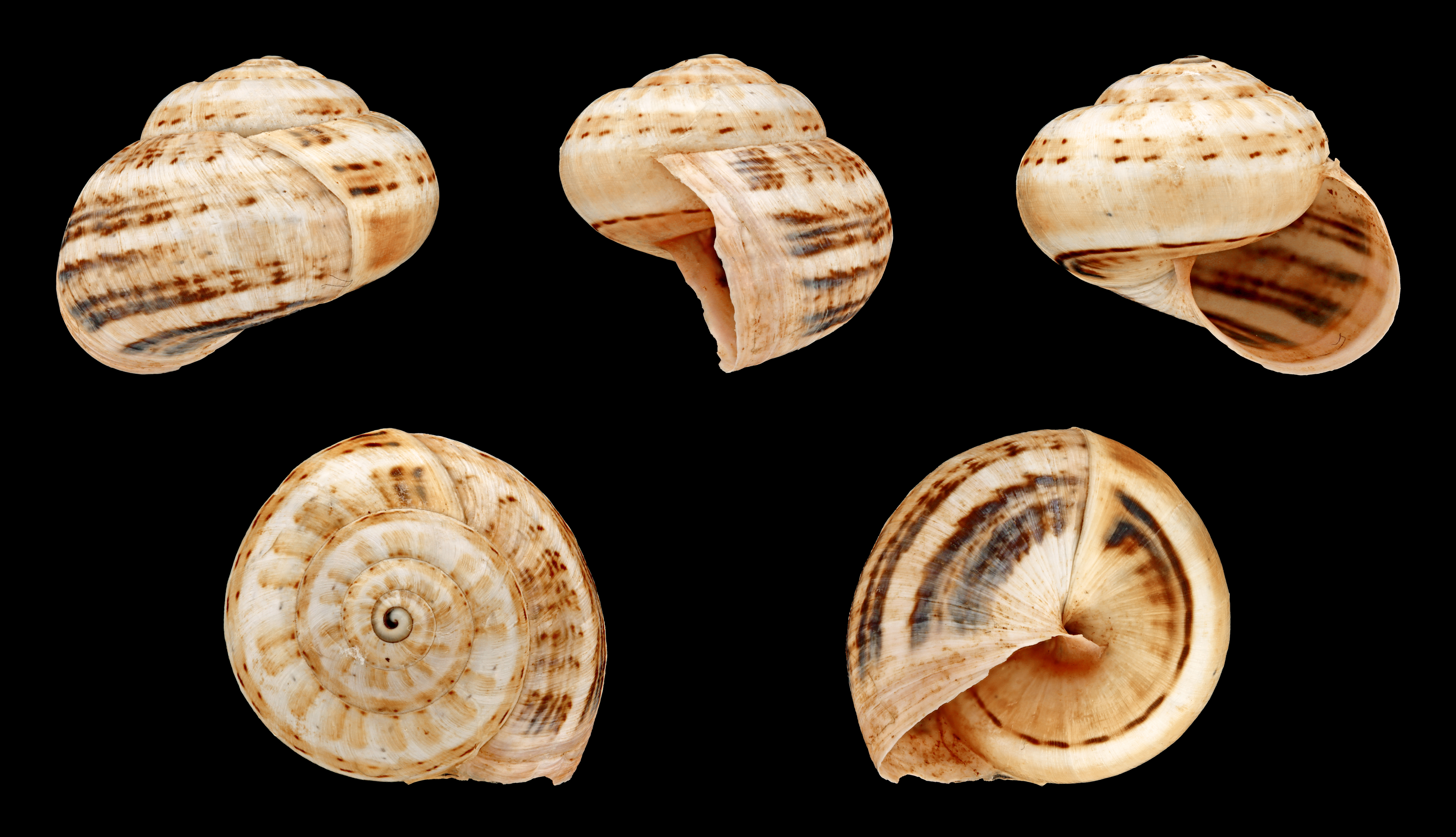
Theba pisana major

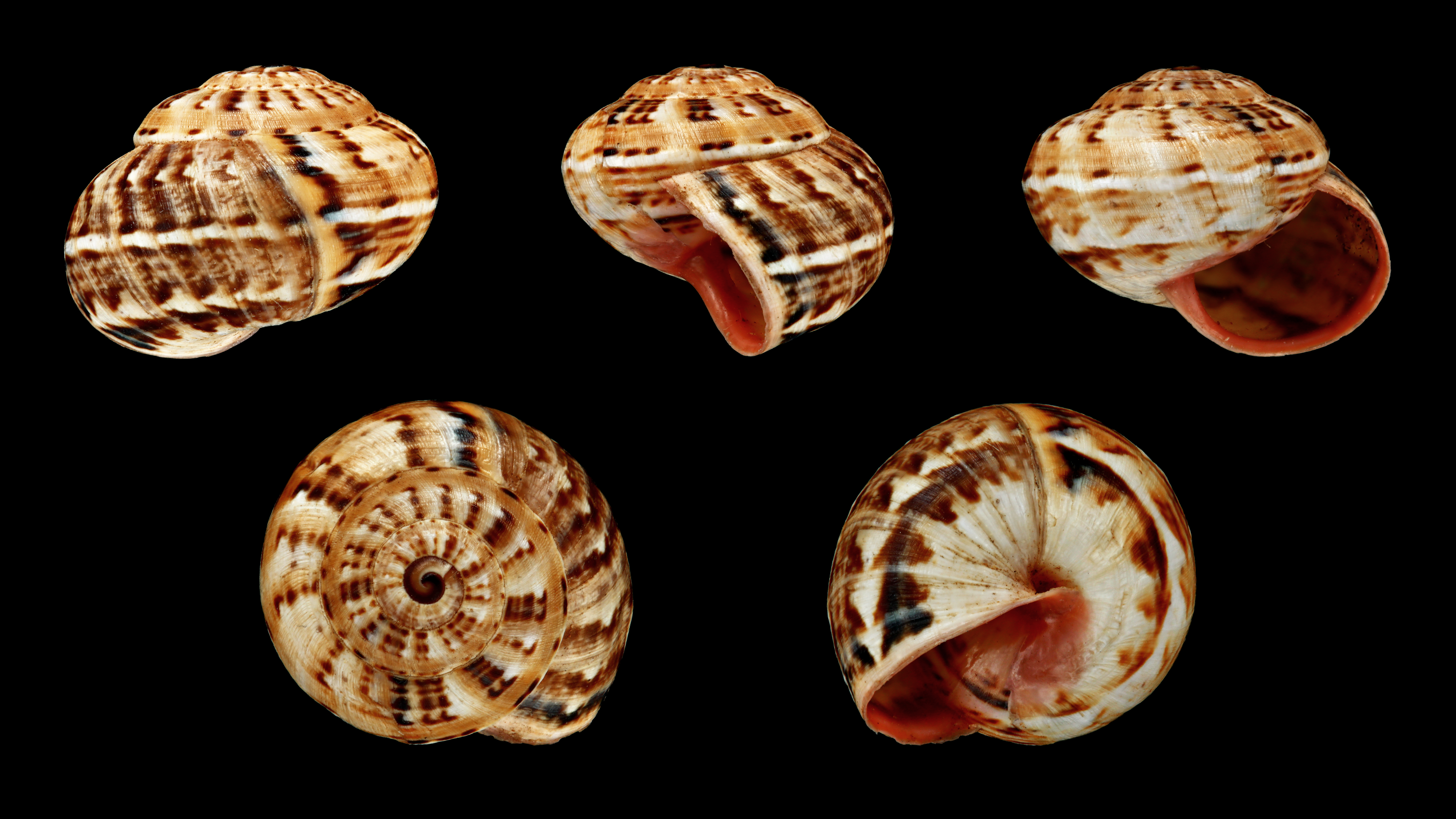
Theba pisana minor

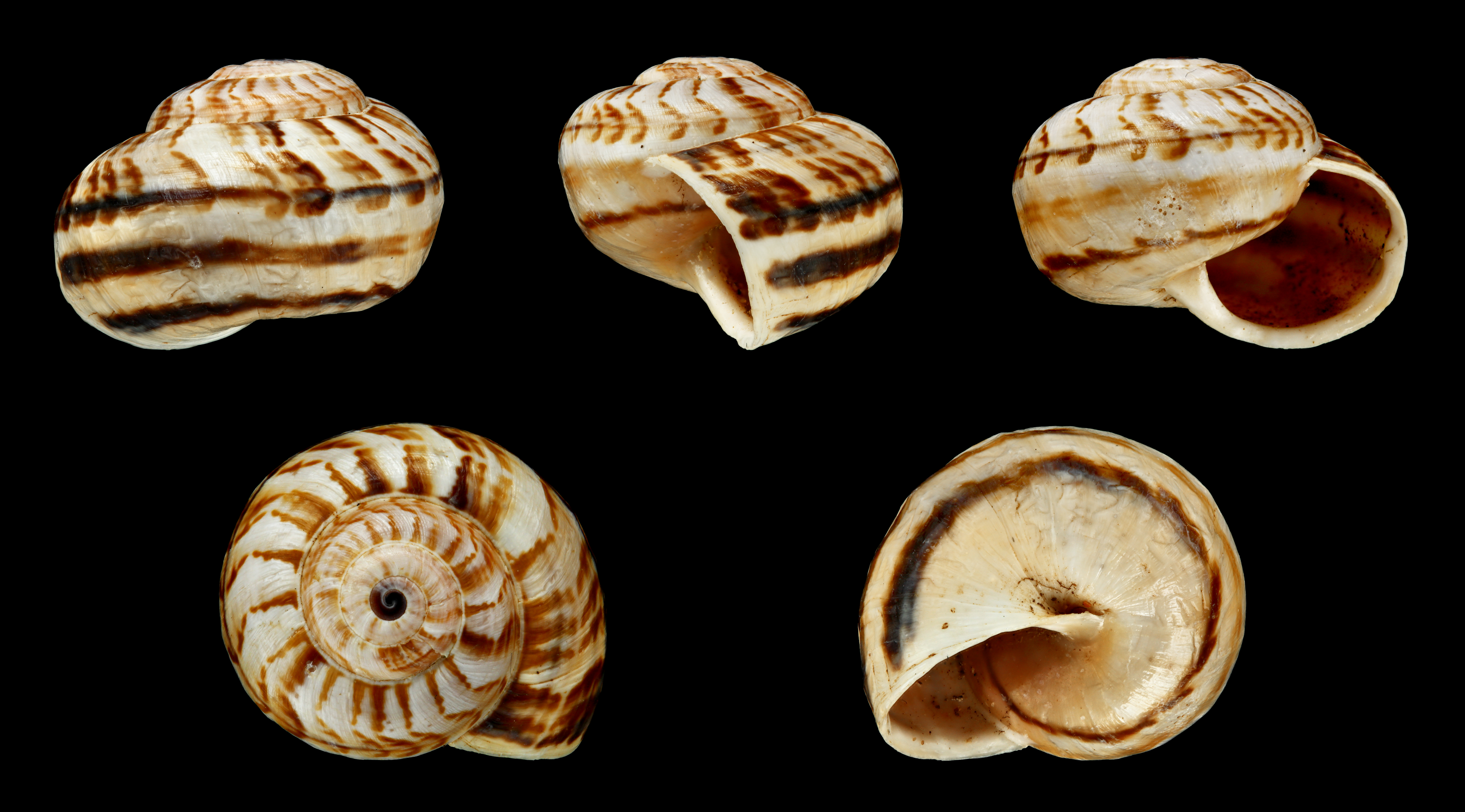
Theba pisana musica

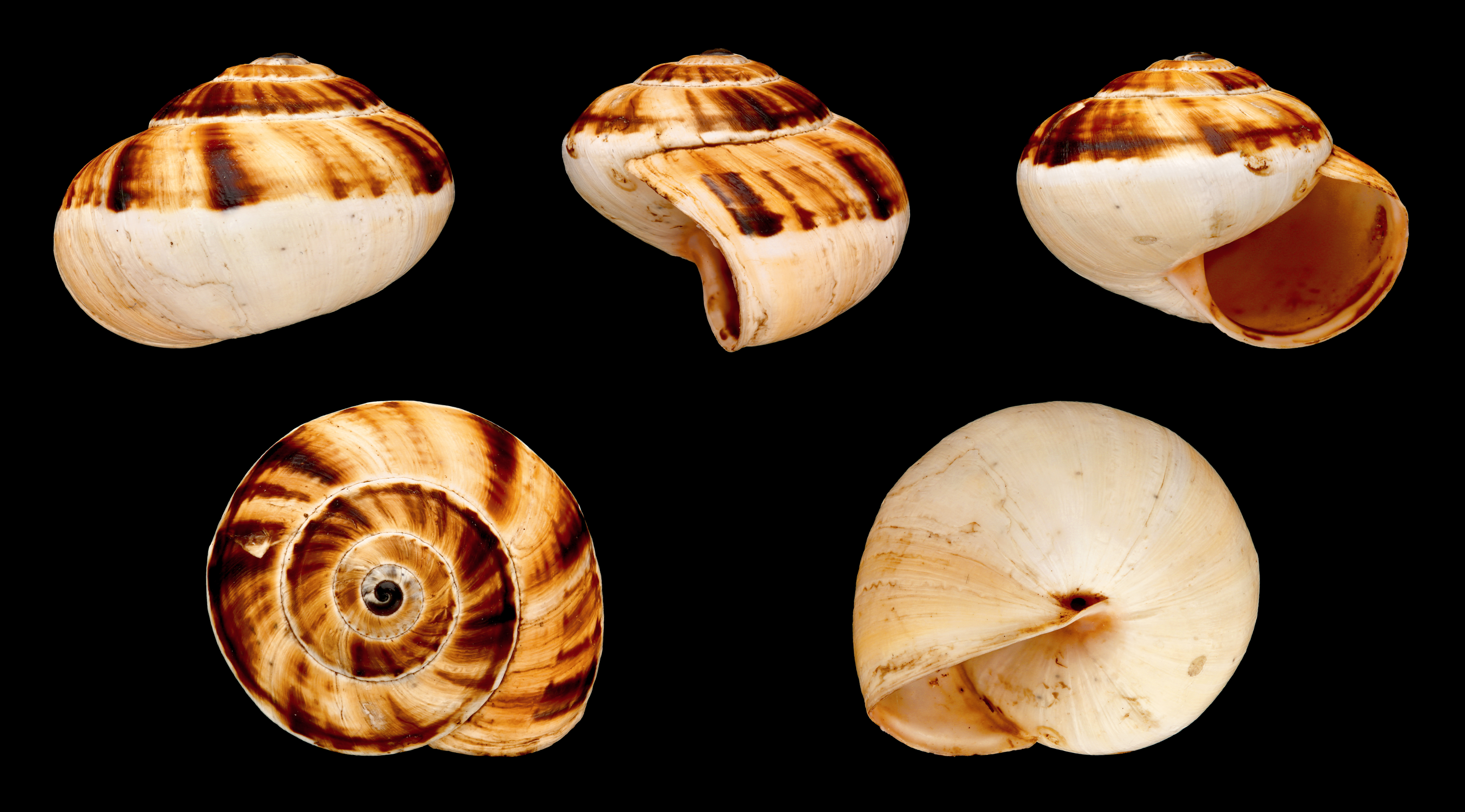
Theba pisana semifulva

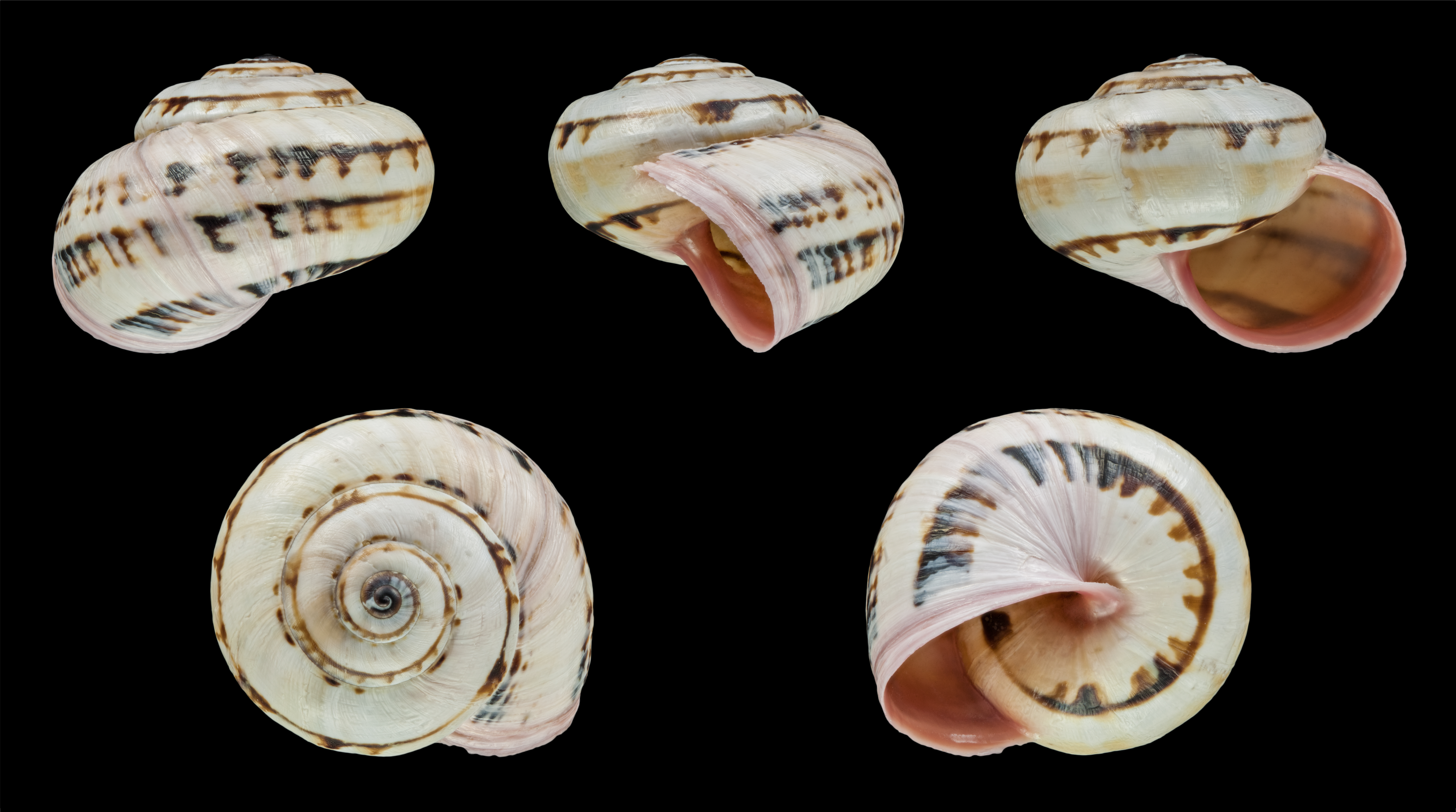
Theba pisana sertum

== Description ==
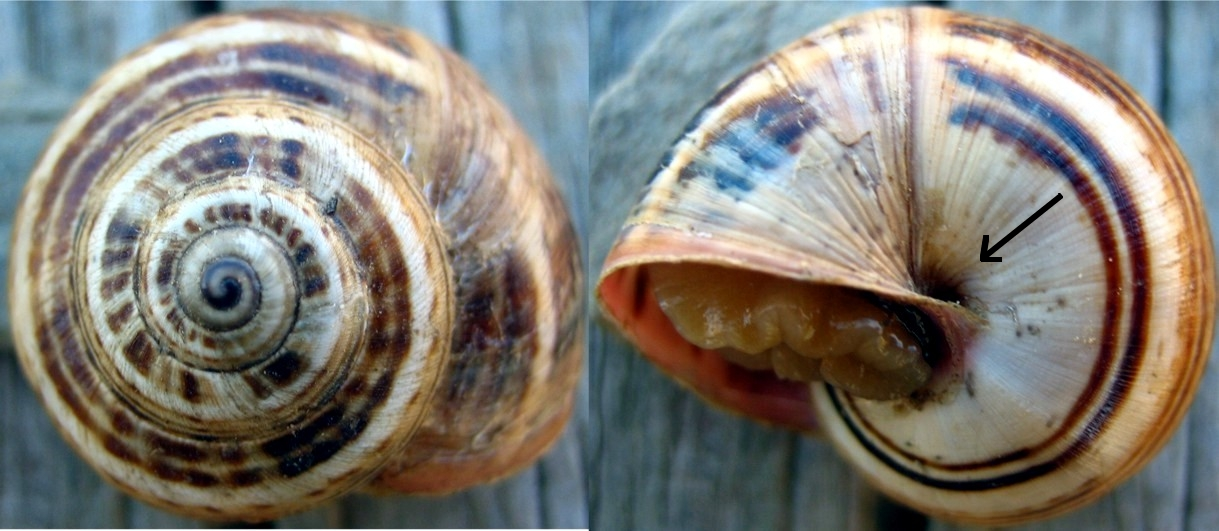
Apical and apertural view of a shell, with an arrow marking the half-colvered umbilicus

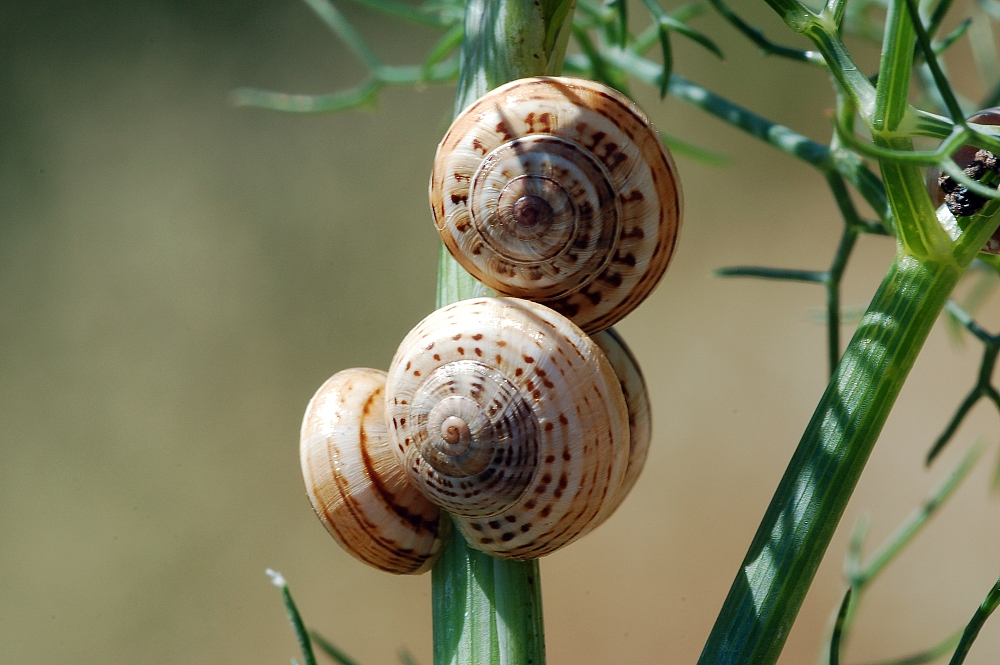
Theba pisana

The shell background color is a creamy white. Different individuals may have shells with varying degrees of pale to dark brown markings. The markings, when present, may be in the form of uninterrupted spiral bands, spiral dotted lines, or small radial smudges.

The shell can be found in various colour variants, but is basically yellow or white with dark color bands or spots and often a dark bluish grey apex. The shells of juveniles are sharply keeled, however the keel is not present on the final adult whorl. The aperture often has a lip that is light reddish on the inside, and the lip margin is only reflected at columellar side. The umbilicus is narrow and half covered by the reflected columellar margin. The apex has a characteristic size in the eastern Mediterranean when compared with other species, where there are no other Theba species. The umbilicus is also rarely seen in other species. Juveniles of Eobania vermiculata have a considerably larger apex.

The width of the shell is 12–25 mm, but in Greece the adult shells are usually below 15 mm in width. The height of the shell is 9–20 mm. The visible soft parts are very light yellowish with dark colour bands running from the sides to the upper tentacles; the tentacles are very long.

This snail is sometimes confused with Cernuella virgata, a species with a much smaller and less inflated shell.

== Ecology ==
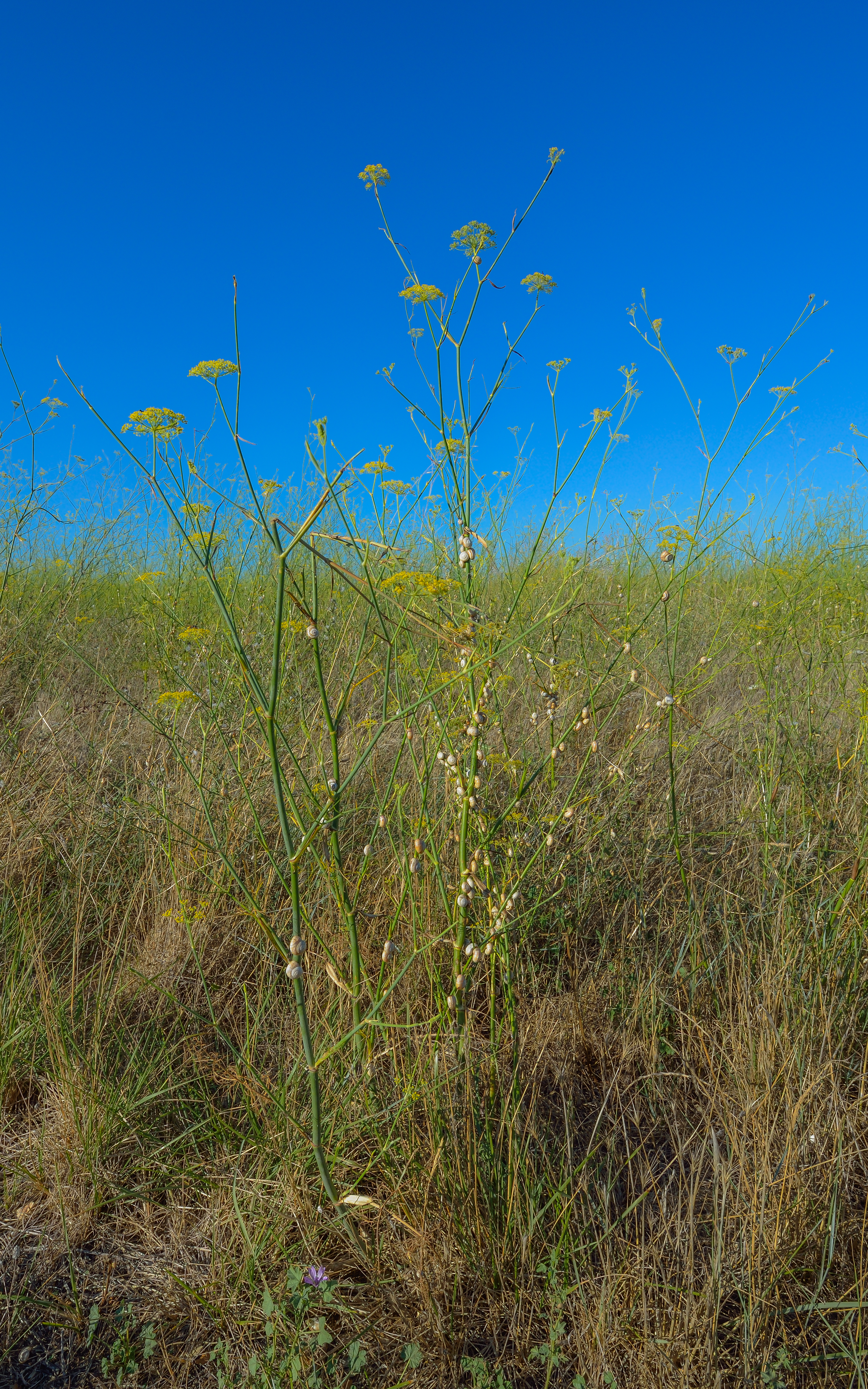
Theba pisana snails aestivate on fennel Foeniculum vulgare in Montbazin, France.

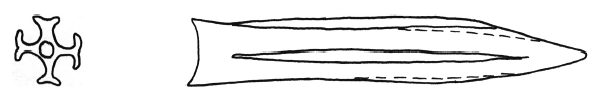
Drawing of love dart of Theba pisana.

Theba pisana usually lives in coastlands, in or near sandy habitats. In hot climates it aestivates often directly exposed to the sun, attached to grasses, shrubs or succulent plants, fence posts, tall weeds, and so on. It is common near beaches. In dunes it can live on nearly bare sand that is poorly fixed in place by grasses. In colder regions the snails do not aestivate, but they do climb on plants in dry weather. This snail does not survive serious winter frosts.

Theba pisana is often associated with two other land snail species Cochlicella acuta and Cernuella virgata, but it can live slightly deeper inside pure sandy habitats, and is usually more common than Cochlicella acuta. It is one of the most common snails in coastal regions from south Portugal to Greece.

In South Africa, a study showed that these snails were most abundant along roadsides; densities decreased dramatically with distance from roads. The snails were observed to be living on a variety of endemic and introduced plant species; these snails appear to be able to eat an unusually wide range of different food sources. Theba pisana is also a significant pest of citrus, vines, legume crops and cereals in South Africa. In Australia, it feeds on a range of agricultural plants.

Most T. pisana snails have an annual life cycle, breeding in summer and autumn, but a few also take 2 years to mature. In aestivating T. pisana populations in Israel some individuals retain an immature size and shape and a rudimentary status of the genital system, defined as 'infantiles'; the populations of T. pisana may be self-regulated by the mechanism of infantilism or controlled by humidity or, perhaps, by both. In South Africa, T. pisana appear to have an annual lifecycle, breeding in autumn to winter and growing to adult size of about 14 mm diameter by the end of the following summer. Maturity is reached at half maximum shell size after 1 year. Maximum shell size is attained after 2 years. This species of snail makes and uses love darts. The size of the egg is 2.2 mm. In South Africa, the population density can reach up to 300-700 snails m^{2}.

In South Africa, these snails are active mostly at night and especially during periods of high humidity, irrespective of temperature.

=== Parasites ===
Theba pisana is an intermediate host for the terrestrial trematode parasite Brachylaima cribbi.

== Impact of invasions ==
In addition to the direct negative effect of T. pisana feeding on agricultural crops, it also has several other additional effects. It uses the stalks of cereals as aestivating sites, which in turn clogs machinery and fouls produce during mechanical harvesting.

According to Quick (1952)Theba pisana has been responsible for the extermination of native snail species as a result of competition for available food.

In their report on the status and potential impacts of alien invasive organisms in the fynbos biome, MacDonald & Jarman (1984) predicted that T. pisana would have very little impact on ecosystem processes, such as nutrient cycling, energy flow and sediment dynamics or on the germination and succession processes of the plant community itself. However, the snail could seriously impact directly on fynbos plants, by feeding on them, and also displace native herbivores by competing with them for resources, and these effects have not been studied.
