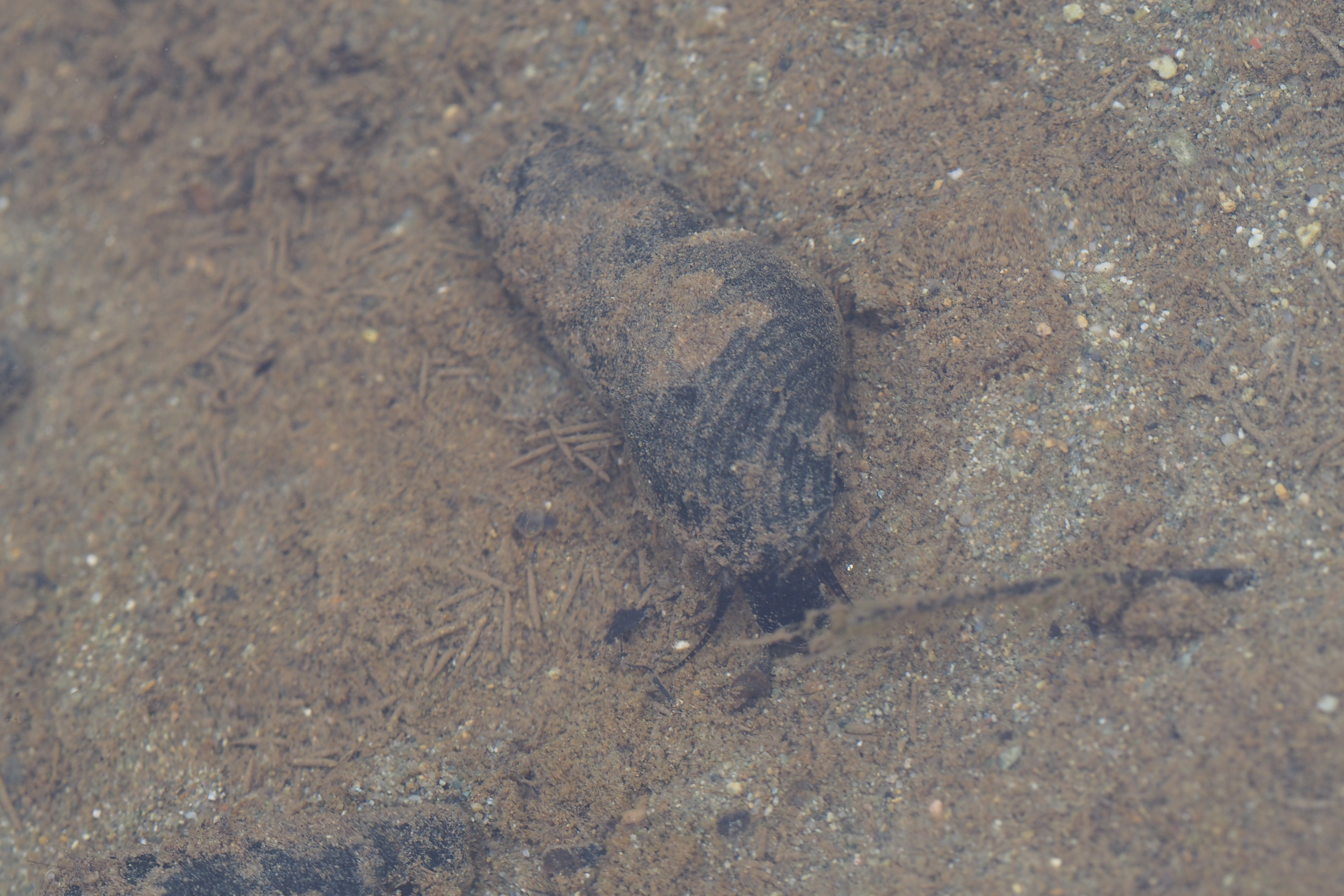
- S. libertina partially covered by detritus, but showing its basal cords, an important identifying feature
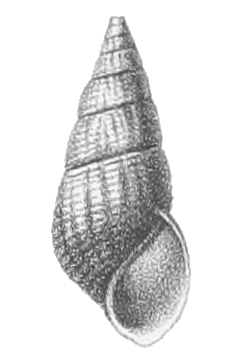
- Drawing of an apertural view of an S. libertina shell

Conservation status
- Least Concern (IUCN 3.1)

Scientific classification
- Kingdom: Animalia
- Phylum: Mollusca
- Class: Gastropoda
- Subclass: Caenogastropoda
- Order: incertae sedis
- Family: Semisulcospiridae
- Genus: Semisulcospira
- Species: S. libertina

Binomial name
- Semisulcospira libertina (Gould, 1859)
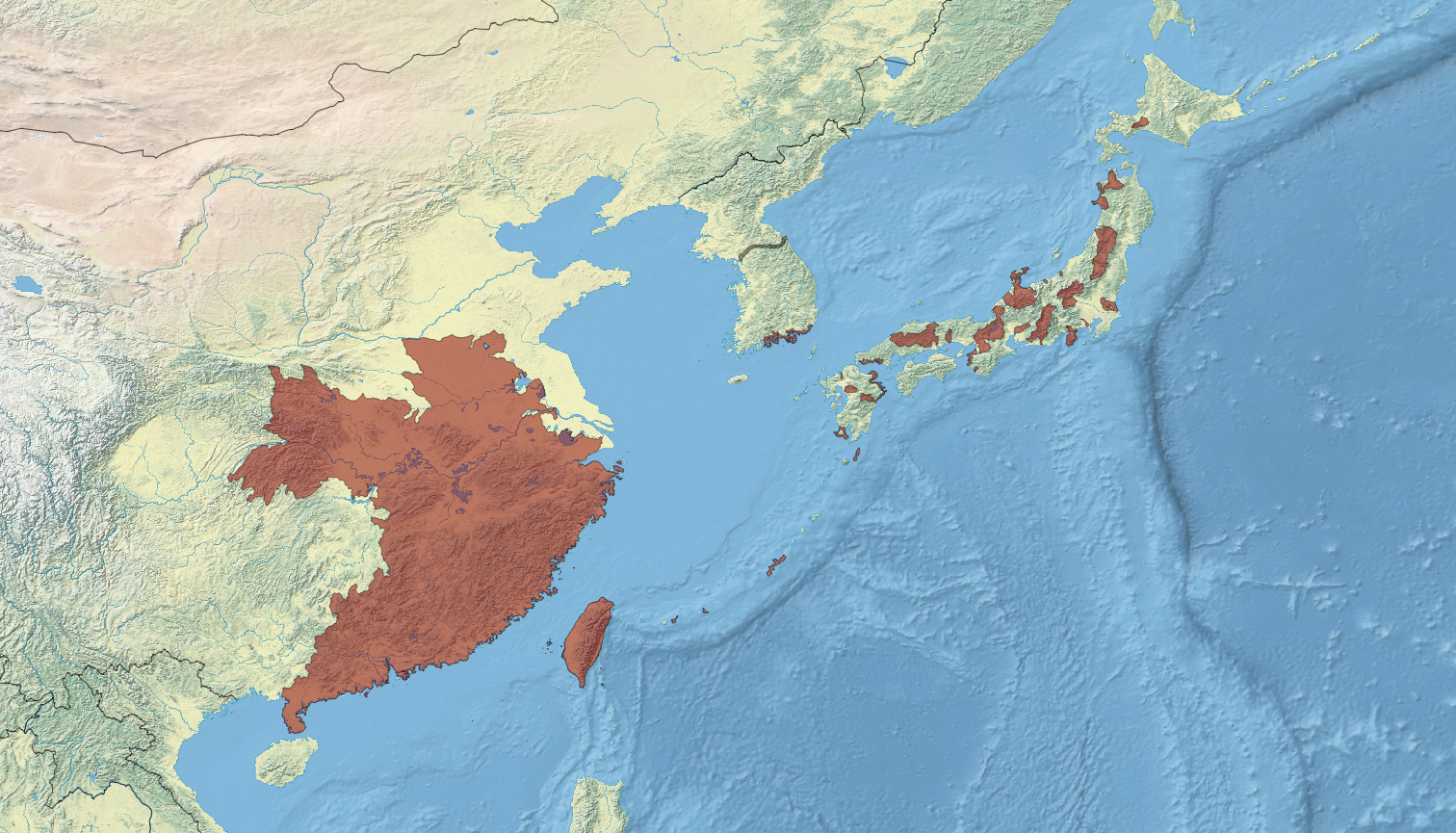
- Distribution map of Semisulcospira libertina

Synonyms
- Melania libertina Gould, 1859; Melanoides libertinus Semisulcospira toucheana

= Semisulcospira libertina =

Semisulcospira libertina Temporal range: Late Pleistocene-Recent

Species of gastropod

Semisulcospira libertina is a species of freshwater snail with an operculum, an aquatic gastropod mollusc in the family Semisulcospiridae. Widespread in east Asia, it lives in China, Taiwan, Korea, Japan, and the Philippines. In some countries it is harvested as a food source. It is medically important as a vector of clonorchiasis, paragonimiasis, metagonimiasis and others.

== Taxonomy ==
The type specimens were collected by American scientist William Stimpson during the North Pacific Exploring and Surveying Expedition (1853–1856). This species was originally described under the name Melania libertina by American malacologist Augustus Addison Gould in 1859. The specific name libertina is from Latin language and means a "freedwoman". Semisulcospira libertina is the type species of the genus Semisulcospira by subsequent designation.

Kuroda (1963) and Habe (1965) considered S libertina a synonym of Semisulcospira bensoni.

The "S. libertina species complex" consist of three species: S. libertina, S. reiniana and S. kurodai, according to Davis (1969). Placement of S. kurodai within this species complex was confirmed by Oniwa and Kimura in 1986.

== Distribution ==
This species occurs in:

- South Korea: continental South Korea and Jeju Island.
- Central China: Hubei, East China: Anhui, Fujian, Jiangxi, Zhejiang and South China: Guangdong.
- Taiwan
- widespread in Japan It is the most common freshwater snail in Japan.
- This species was also reported from the Philippines.

The type locality was listed as "Simoda and Ousima" by Gould in 1859, that means two localities: Shimoda City in Honshu and Amami Ōshima in Ryukyu Islands. Davis (1979) identified the presumed type locality Inozawa River, Inozawa Section, Shimoda City, Izu Peninsula, Shizuoka Prefecture, Honshu.

Miura et al. (2013) studied mitochondrial haplotypes of Semisulcospira libertina from Korea and from Japan. Mixed haplotypes in Korea suggest long-distance palaeo-migration across the Korea Strait from Japan to Korea.

Shells of Semisulcospira libertina were also found in the Nojiri-ko Formation at the Lake Nojiri in Central Japan from the age of 27,000 years BP.

== Description ==
The shell has 4–6 whorls, while the apex of the shell is usually eroded. The spire is long. The aperture is continuous and the apertural lip is simple. Umbilicus is closed. The shell of Semisulcospira libertina is very variable. There are seven or more (up to 12) basal cords (spiral sculptures at the base of the body whorl). There are sometimes transverse ribs present on the shell sculpture: 12–18 ribs per penultimate whorl. Periostracum is smooth. The color of the shell is usually light yellow, but it can be light brown very rarely. The spire is darker yellowish-brown. Number of shells is banded with purple brown spiral bands, either with one band, two bands, or three bands.

The average width of the shell of Semisulcospira libertina is 11.0 millimetres (0.43 in) – 13.0 millimetres (0.51 in). The average height of the shell is 26.0 millimetres (1.02 in) – 28.6 millimetres (1.13 in) in Japan.

In Korea, the average width of the shell of Semisulcospira libertina is 12.55–19.37 mm (0.494–0.763 in). The average height of the shell is 6.44–9.2 mm (0.254–0.362 in). The average total wet weight is 0.24–0.86 g (0.0085–0.0303 oz). The average weight of the shell is 0.16–0.62 g (0.0056–0.0219 oz). The average weight of the meat is 0.09–0.39 g (0.0032–0.0138 oz).

The extrema dimensions were measured in another locality in Korea: The total wet weight ranges from 0.3 g (0.011 oz) (shell height 9.87 mm (0.389 in)) to 1.55 g (0.055 oz) (shell height 22.57 mm (0.889 in)).

Mineral composition of the shell of this species is as follows: 52.9% CaO, 0.77% SiO_{2}, 0.36% Na_{2}O, 0.06% Al_{2}O_{3}, 0.05% Fe_{2}O_{3}, 0.01% MgO and 0.01% P_{2}O_{5}. There is 45.44% of citrulline of free amino acids (amino acids in blood).

Nelson Annandale depicted the operculum and radula of this species in 1924. Ko et al. (2001) described the radula of this species in detail. The shape of the operculum is ovate and the profile of the shape of the operculum is flat. Coiling of the operculum is paucispiral. Nucleus of the operculum is eccentric.

Cephalic tentacles are short (approximately the same size as the length of the snout).

The reproductive system in a male has the following parts: testis, vas deferens, the spermatophore organ. There is no penis. The reproductive system in a female has the following parts: ovary, the pallial oviduct, the spermatophore bursa, the seminal receptacle and the brood pouch.

The diploid chromosome number of Semisulcospira libertina is 2n=36. The complete mitochondrial genome of Semisulcospira libertina is known since 2015. Its length is 15,432 bp. It was the first mitochondrial genome resolved within the whole superfamily Cerithioidea.

Semisulcospira reiniana is very similar species: its embryos are larger and embryos are with ribs, adult shells are more slender, 2n=40.

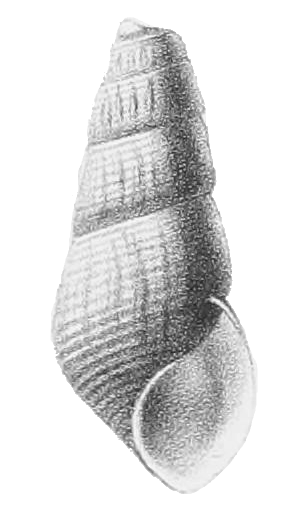
Drawing of an apertural view of a shell of Semisulcospira libertina.

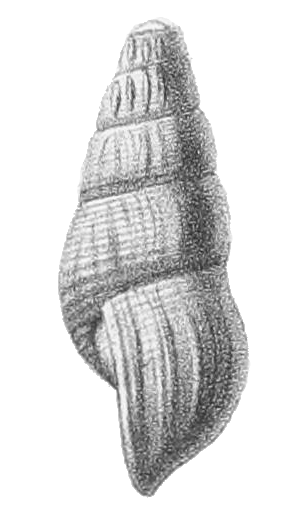
Drawing of a lateral view of a shell of Semisulcospira libertina.

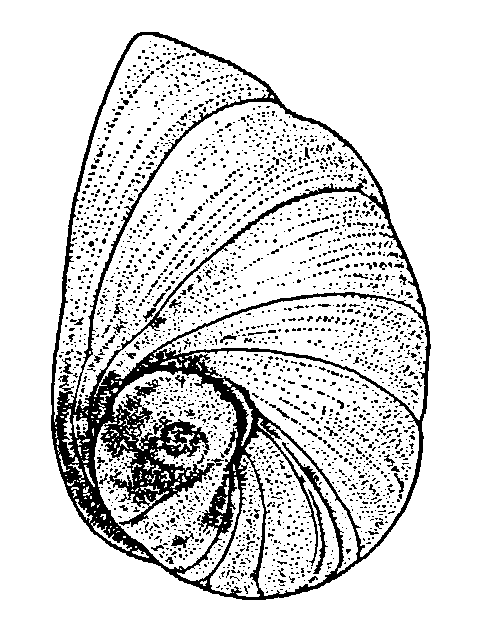
Drawing of an operculum of Semisulcospira libertina.

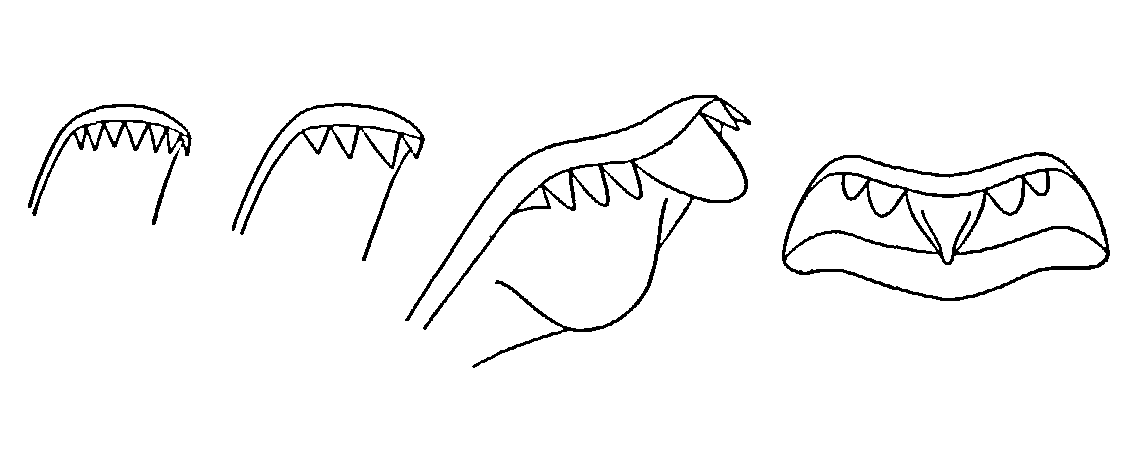
Drawing of radular teeth of Semisulcospira libertina

== Ecology ==
=== Habitat ===
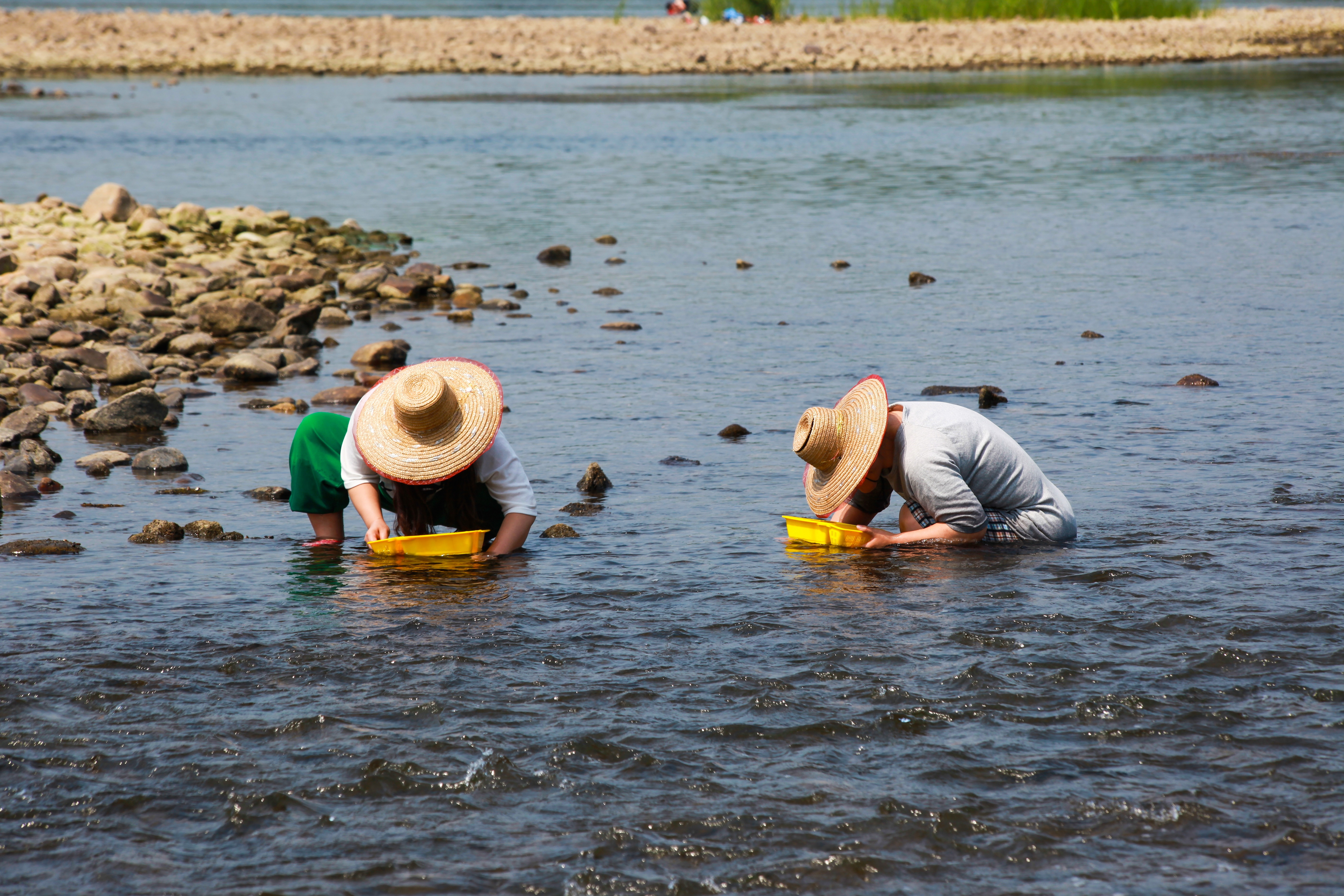
People gathering Semisulcospira libertina by hand at Chungju Lake, Namhan River, Korea

Habitats of Semisulcospira libertina include pools, slow flowing rivers, drainage ditches, rice paddies, streams. Kim (1970) studied the habitat of Semisulcospira libertina in Korea. The water temperature is 1.3–22.5 °C.

The pollution tolerance value is 3 (on scale 0–10; 0 is the best water quality, 10 is the worst water quality).

High concentration of cadmium may affect behavior of this species.

=== Feeding habits ===
Semisulcospira libertina is polyphagous species and a grazer. It feeds mainly on phytoplankton and detritus. Chemoautotrophic bacteria are probable food source of Semisulcospira libertina, because δ^{13}C and δ^{34}S values were lower than in other invertebrates on the site.

There are 0.032 mg/g of carotenoids in the body of Semisulcospira libertina (shell exclude). Carotenoids composition include: β-Carotene 45%, lutein 13%, zeaxanthin 12%, canthaxanthin 6.5%, (3S,3'S)-astaxanthin 6.5%, (3S)-adonirubin, echinenone 3%, α-Carotene 2%, (3S,3'R)-adonixanthin 1%, fritschiellaxanthin 0.5%, traces of diatoxanthin, fucoxanthin, fucoxanthinol, and other carotenoids 4.5%. Beta-carotene is probably originated from green algae and from cyanobacteria. Lutein is from green algae. Zeaxanthin is from cyanobacteria. Other non-trace carotenoids are probably their oxidative metabolites.

=== Life cycle ===
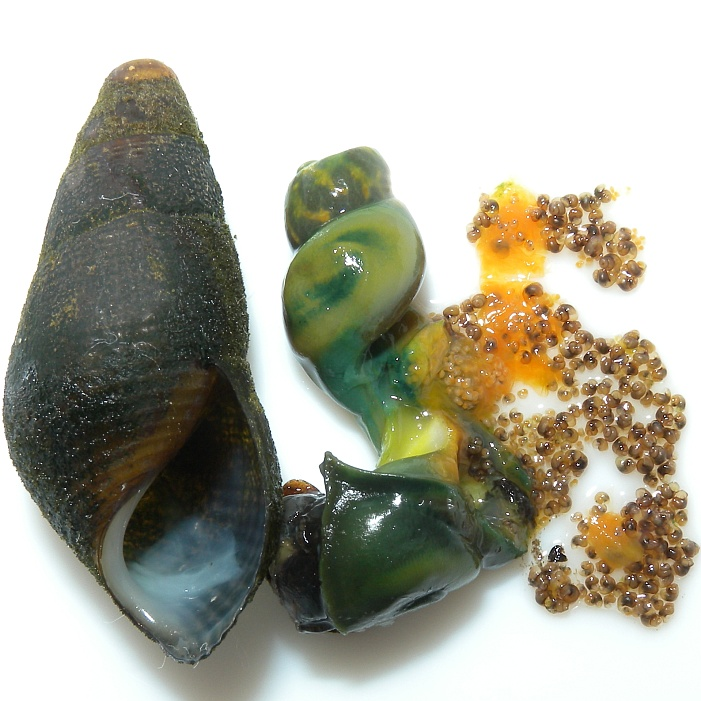
Semisulcospira libertina can have hundreds of embryos.

Semisulcospira libertina is gonochoristic, which means that each individual animal is distinctly male or female. Semisulcospira libertina is ovoviviparous. The whole larval development occur in the brood pouch of the female. Egg develops into the trochophore, preveliger, veliger, and to the juvenile. There is much of yolk in the embryo. The development from the egg to the veliger lasts 17 days in the temperature 25 °C. The full development lasts about 8 months in winter and about 2 months in summer. Embryos are without ribs on the shell, but they usually have 1–2 spiral cords. The color of embryo is brown, sometimes yellow.

The female has over 80 small embryos in its brood pouch. Average number of embryos is 58–124 embryos in July. Average number of embryos is 222–570 embryos in November. A single female will usually gave birth to about 607–858 during one year. Recorded maximum was 1535 newborn snails in one year.

Female gave birth to newborn snails in temperature from 12 to 24 °C (54 to 75 °F). Birth of snails occur mainly in two periods: in March–May and in September–October. Newborn snails have a width of the shell 0.60–0.99 mm (maximum 1.22 mm). The height of a shell of a newborn snail is up to 1.73 mm. The shell of newborn snails has 2.0–3.5 whorls. The life span is about 2 years.

=== Parasites ===
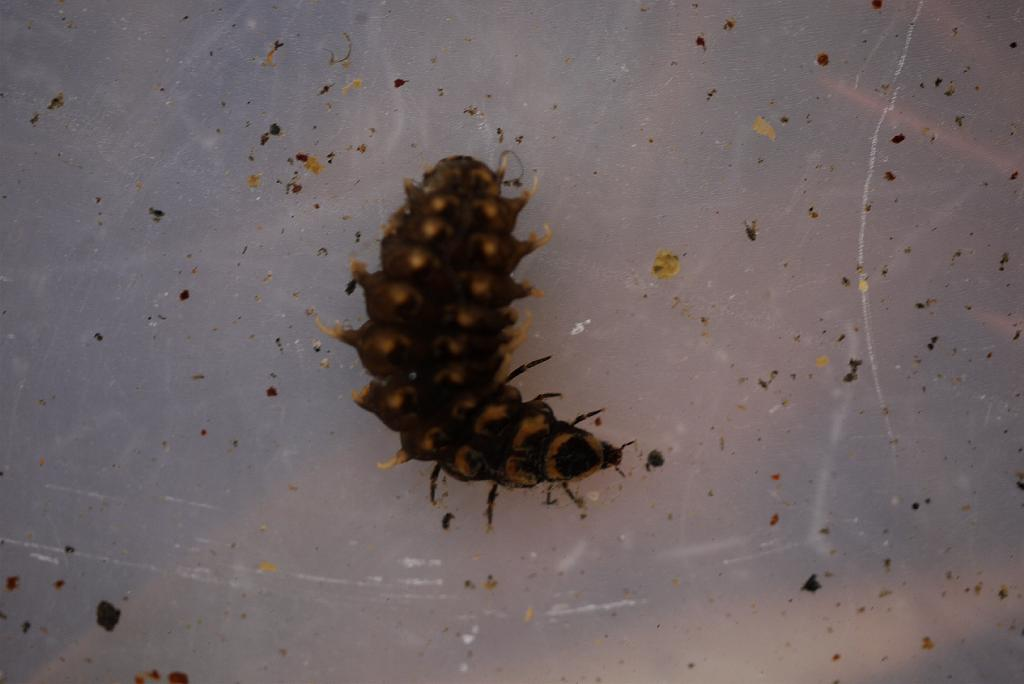
Larva of Japanese firefly Luciola cruciata is a predator of Semisulcospira libertina.

Parasites of Semisulcospira libertina include the following flukes. Some of them are medically important:

- Opisthorchiidae: Semisulcospira libertina serves as the first intermediate host for Clonorchis sinensis in China.
- Paragonimidae: Semisulcospira libertina serves as the first intermediate host for Paragonimus westermani.
- Heterophyidae: Semisulcospira libertina serves as the first intermediate host for Metagonimus miyatai and Metagonimus yokogawai.
- Heterophyidae: Semisulcospira libertina serves as the first intermediate host for Centrocestus armatus and Centrocestus formosanus.
- Philophthalmidae: Cercariae of Philophthalmus sp. were found in Semisulcospira libertina in Japan.
- Liolopidae: Semisulcospira libertina serves as the first intermediate host for Liolope copulans.
- Derogenidae: Cercariae of Genarchopsis goppo were found in Semisulcospira libertina in Japan.
- Lecithodendriidae: Semisulcospira libertina serves as the first intermediate host for Acanthatrium hitaensis.

Shinagawa et al. (2001) studied the metabolism and activity of Semisulcospira libertina infected by trematodes.

Bacteria Neorickettsia risticii was detected in cercaria from Semisulcospira libertina in Korea.

=== Predators ===
Predators of Semisulcospira libertina include fireflies, such as aquatic larvae of firefly Luciola cruciata.

== Human use ==
=== Culinary ===
Semisulcospira libertina
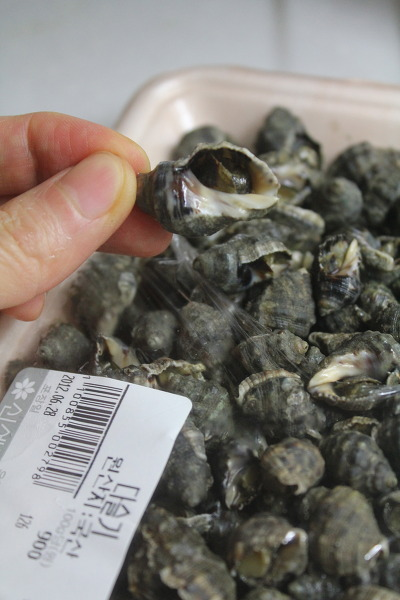
- Pre-packaged Semisulcospira libertina snails sold in Korea

Nutritional value per 100 g (3.5 oz)
- Fat
- Saturated: 28.7% of fat
- Monounsaturated: 35.5% of fat
- Polyunsaturated: 35.8% of fat
- Protein: % of amino acids / % of free amino acids
Amino acids
Tryptophan	0.22% / 0.22%
Threonine	5.4% / 1.87%
Isoleucine	4.6% / 0.06%
Leucine	8.6% / 6.96%
Lysine	6.9% / 2.87%
Methionine	2.1% / 0.25%
Cystine	1.2% / 1.92%
Phenylalanine	4.4% / 0.0%
Tyrosine	3.0% / 0.96%
Valine	5.4% / 0.68%
Arginine	7.0% / 0.82%
Histidine	2.4% / 0.35%
Alanine	6.9% / 9.39%
Aspartic acid	11.1% / 0.0%
Glutamic acid	14.9% / 0.06%
Glycine	6.6% / 2.77%
Proline	5.1% / 0.52%
Serine	4.4% / 0.09%
- Vitamins: Quantity %DV^{†}
- Vitamin A equiv. beta-Carotene lutein zeaxanthin: 249% 2240 μg 13% 1440 μg 800 μg
- Minerals: Quantity %DV^{†}
- Calcium: 15% 194.5 mg
- Iron: 6% 1.1 mg
- Phosphorus: 1% 16.4 mg
- Other constituents: Quantity
- Water: 81.0 g
- Crude fat: 1.2 g
- Crude protein: 11.9 g
- Crude ash: 1.9 g
- Chlorophyll: 170 mg
- For 100 g of meat there would be need ~250–1000 snails.
- ^{†}Percentages estimated using US recommendations for adults.

==== Japan ====
This species is used in Japanese cuisine.

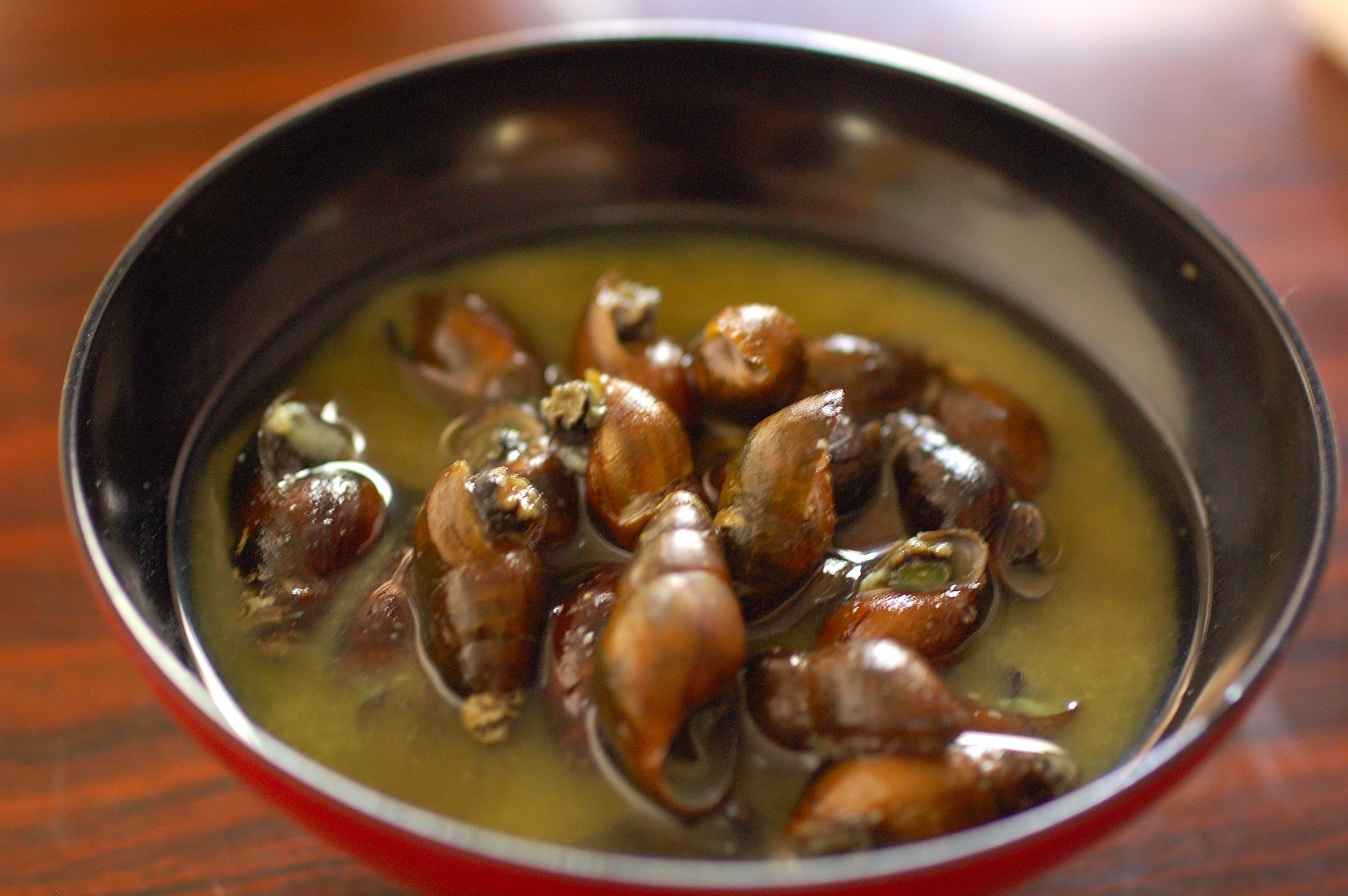
Japanese food with Semisulcospira libertina

==== Korea ====
In Korean cuisine, daseulgi-guk (다슬기국) is a type of guk (soup) made with Semisulcospira libertina.

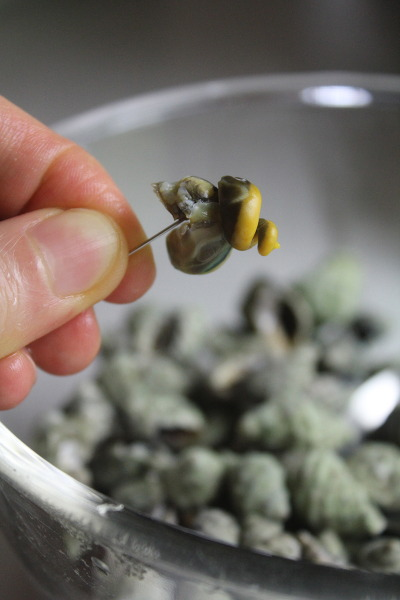
Blanched daseulgi

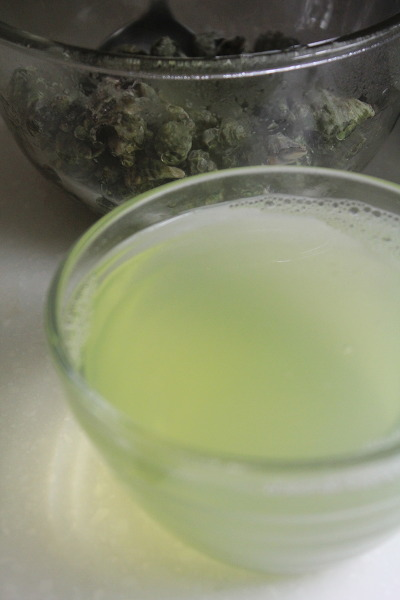
Daseulgi broth

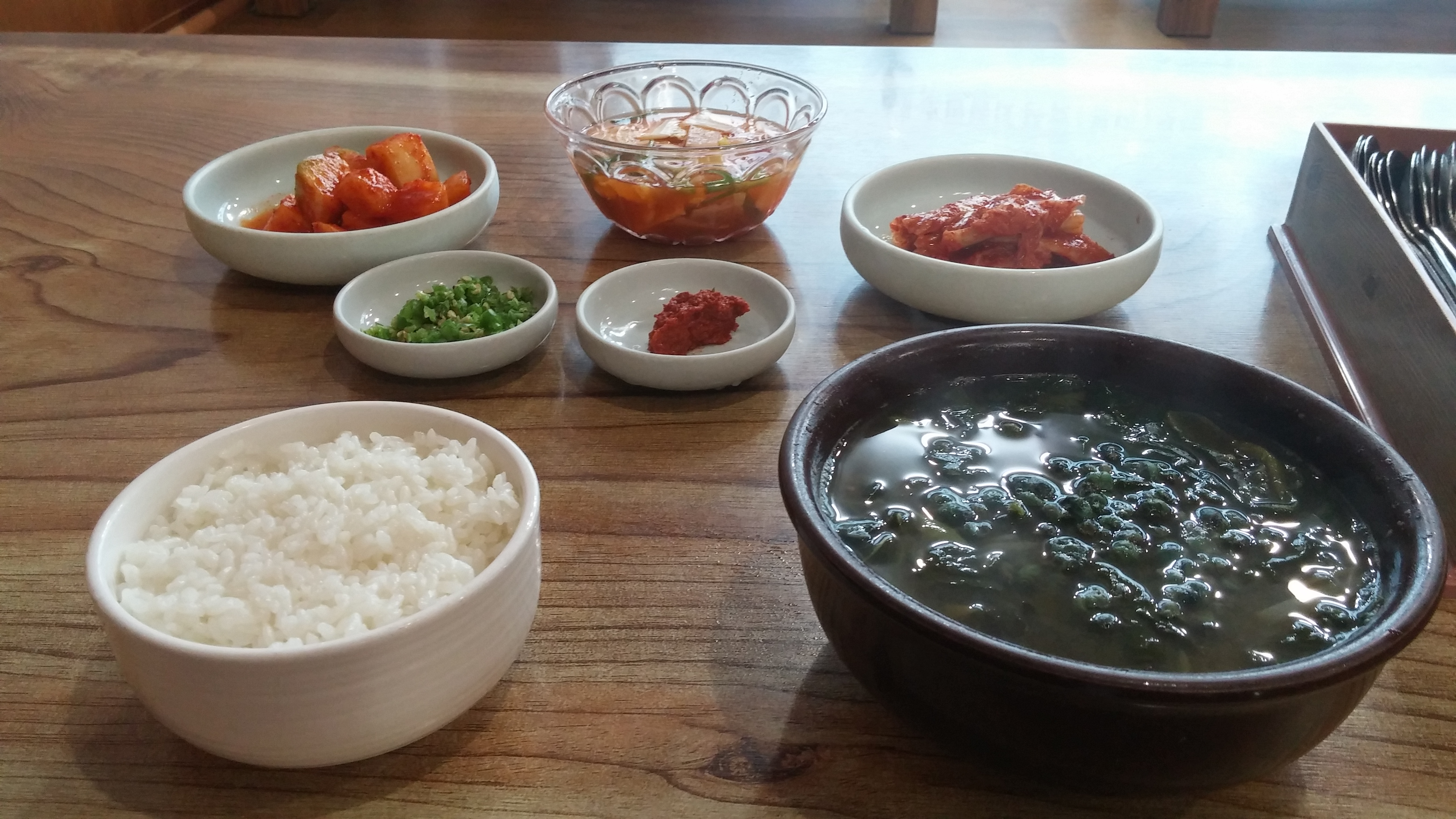
Daseulgi-guk (soup)

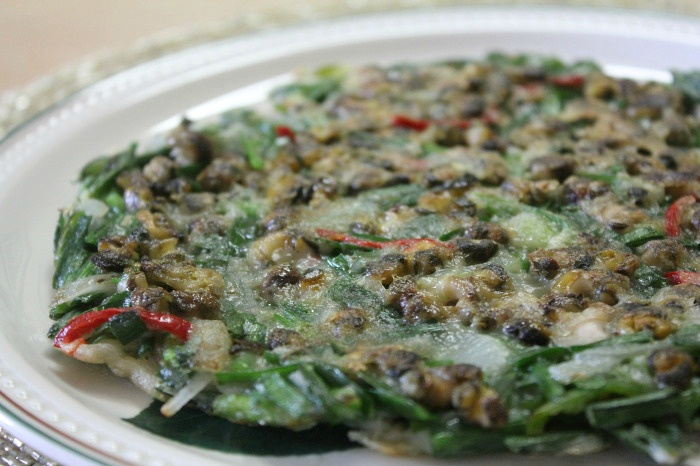
Daseulgi-buchimgae (pancake)

=== Medicinal ===
==== Korea ====
This species is used as medicinal species in traditional medicine practices on gastrointestinal disorders in Korea. Juice, panbroiled, powder, and simmer from the whole Semisulcospira libertina is used for cure of gastroenteric trouble in Jirisan National Park, Korea. Simmer from the whole Semisulcospira libertina is used for cure of indigestion in Jirisan National Park. Semisulcospira libertina is also used as clear soup with flour dumplings, infusion, juice, soup or as simmer for cure liver-related ailments in traditional medicine in the Southern Regions of Korea.

The non-intentional exposure to shell powder from this species caused the first reported silicosis of such origin in 2012.
