= Semisulcospira diminuta =

Conservation status
- Data Deficient (IUCN 3.1)

Scientific classification
- Kingdom: Animalia
- Phylum: Mollusca
- Class: Gastropoda
- Subclass: Caenogastropoda
- Order: incertae sedis
- Family: Semisulcospiridae
- Genus: Semisulcospira
- Species: S. diminuta

Binomial name
- Semisulcospira diminuta Gredler, 1887

Species of gastropod

Semisulcospira diminuta is a species of freshwater snail with an operculum, an aquatic gastropod mollusc in the family Semisulcospiridae.

== Distribution ==
This species occurs in Hunan Province, China.
