= Semisulcospira decipiens =

Conservation status
- Vulnerable (IUCN 3.1)

Scientific classification
- Kingdom: Animalia
- Phylum: Mollusca
- Class: Gastropoda
- Subclass: Caenogastropoda
- Order: incertae sedis
- Family: Semisulcospiridae
- Genus: Semisulcospira
- Species: S. decipiens

Binomial name
- Semisulcospira decipiens (Westerlund, 1883)

Synonyms
- Melania niponica var. decipiens Westerlund, 1883

Species of gastropod

Semisulcospira decipiens is a species of freshwater snail with an operculum, an aquatic gastropod mollusc in the family Semisulcospiridae.

== Taxonomy ==
Type specimen were collected during the Vega Expedition led by Adolf Erik Nordenskiöld in 1878–1880. This species was originally described under the name Melania niponica var. decipiens by Swedish malacologist Carl Agardh Westerlund in 1883.

Semisulcospira decipiens belong to the Semisulcospira niponica species group.

== Distribution ==
This species occurs in Lake Biwa and in the Yodo River, Japan.

The type locality is Lake Biwa.
