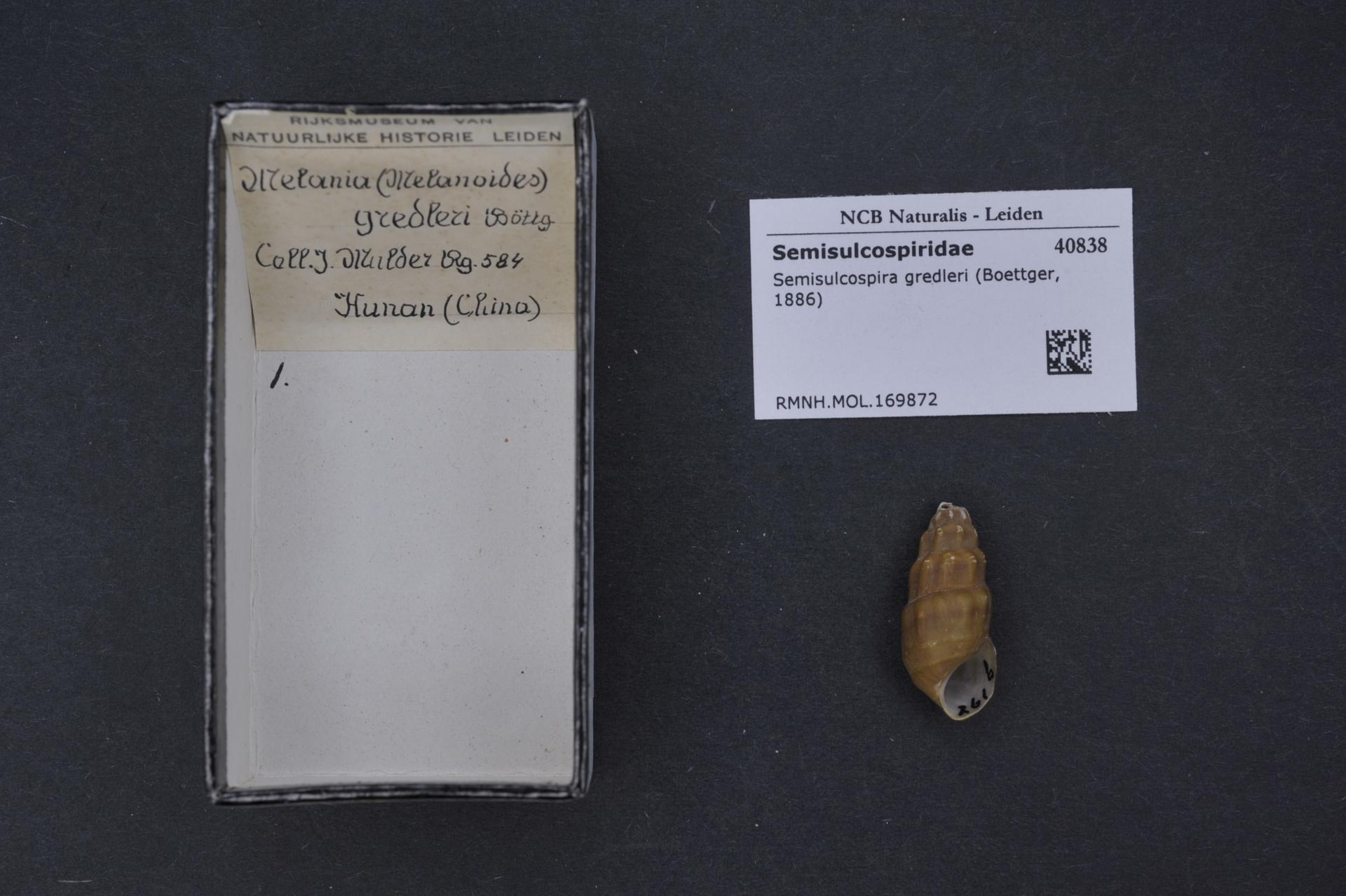
- Semisulcospira gredleri shell

Scientific classification
- Kingdom: Animalia
- Phylum: Mollusca
- Class: Gastropoda
- Subclass: Caenogastropoda
- Family: Semisulcospiridae
- Genus: Semisulcospira
- Species: S. gredleri

Binomial name
- Semisulcospira gredleri (Boettger, 1886)

= Semisulcospira gredleri =

Species of gastropod

Semisulcospira gredleri is a species of freshwater snail with an operculum, an aquatic gastropod mollusk in the family Semisulcospiridae.

The specific name gredleri is in honor of Vinzenz Maria Gredler.

== Distribution ==
This species occurs in Jiangsu Province, China.

== Description ==
The female reproductive system was described by Prozorova & Rasshepkina in 2005.
