= Cephalouterina decamptodoni =

Scientific classification
- Kingdom: Animalia
- Phylum: Platyhelminthes
- Class: Trematoda
- Order: Plagiorchiida
- Family: Lecithodendriidae
- Genus: Cephalouterina
- Species: C. decamptodoni

Binomial name
- Cephalouterina decamptodoni

Species of fluke

Cephalouterina decamptodoni is a species of trematodes within the family Lecithodendriidae under the order Plagiorchiida. This species is sometimes known to use amphibian hosts.

C. decamptodoni has been isolated within the amphibian host rough-skinned newt in British Columbia.

== See also ==
- Flatworm
- Parasite
