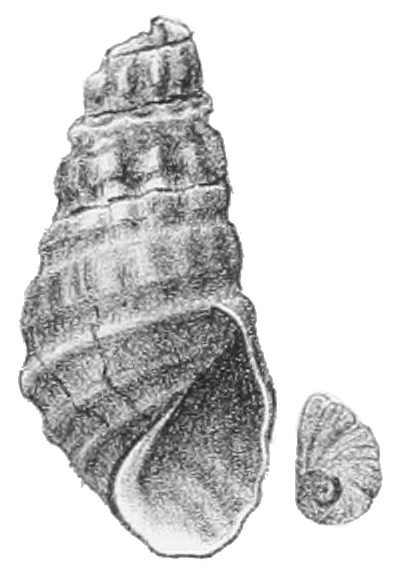
- Drawing on an apertural view of a shell and an operculum of Semisulcospira gottschei

Scientific classification
- Kingdom: Animalia
- Phylum: Mollusca
- Class: Gastropoda
- Subclass: Caenogastropoda
- Order: incertae sedis
- Family: Semisulcospiridae
- Genus: Semisulcospira
- Species: S. gottschei

Binomial name
- Semisulcospira gottschei (Martens, 1886)

Synonyms
- Melania gottschei Martens, 1886

= Semisulcospira gottschei =

Species of freshwater gastropod

Semisulcospira gottschei is a species of freshwater snail with an operculum, an aquatic gastropod mollusk in the family Semisulcospiridae.

The specific name gottschei is in honor of German geologist Carl Christian Gottsche, who collected type specimen during his research in Korea in 1884.

== Distribution ==
This species occurs in the South Korea. The type locality is Han River in Seoul.

== Ecology ==
Semisulcospira gottschei serves as the first intermediate host for Paragonimus westermani.
