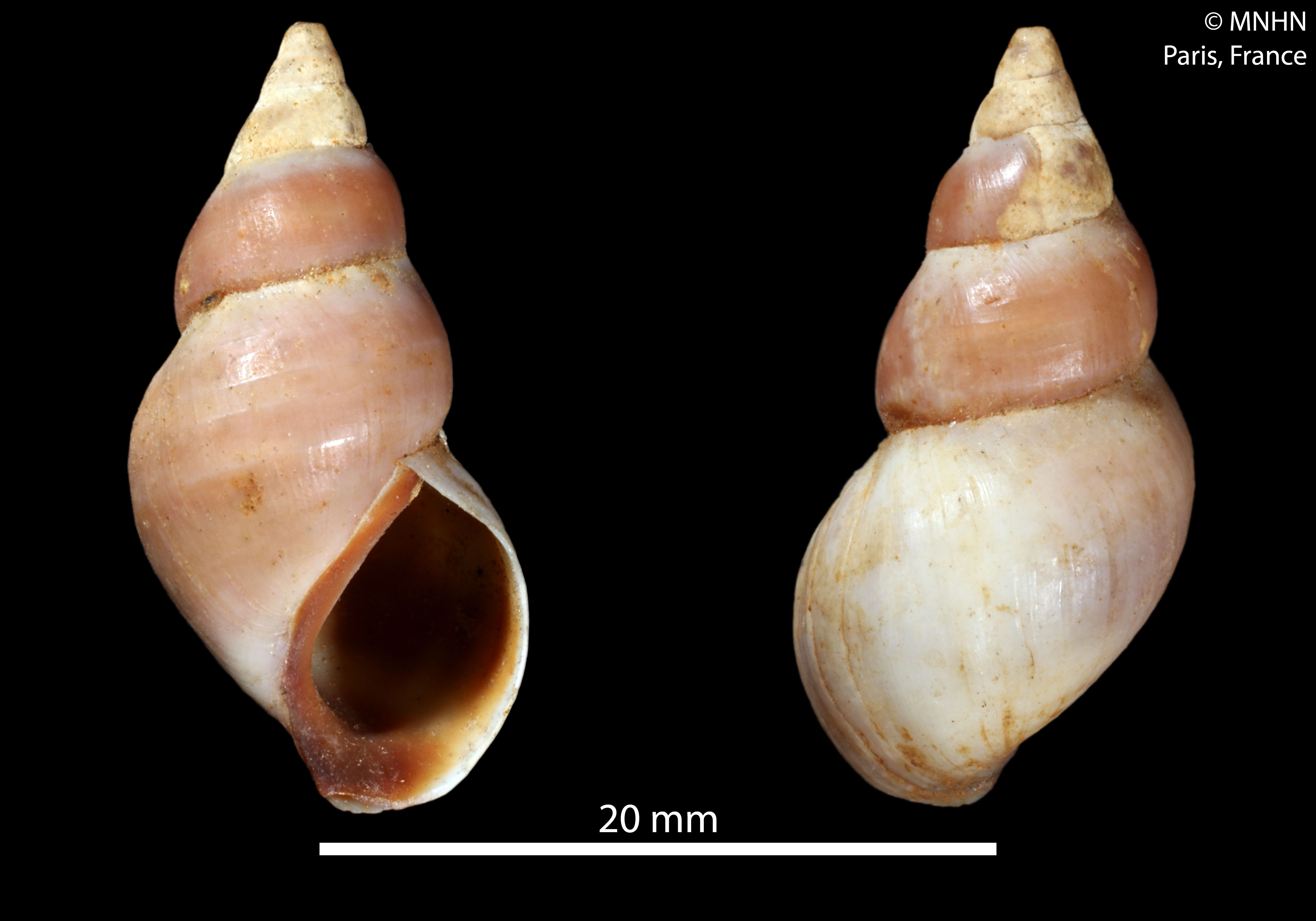
- Shell of Hua jacqueti (specimen at MNHN, Paris)

Scientific classification
- Kingdom: Animalia
- Phylum: Mollusca
- Class: Gastropoda
- Subclass: Caenogastropoda
- Order: incertae sedis
- Superfamily: Cerithioidea
- Family: Semisulcospiridae
- Genus: Hua; S.-F. Chen, 1943

Type species
- Melania telonaria Heude, 1889

= Hua (gastropod) =

Genus of gastropods

Hua is a genus of freshwater snails with an operculum, an aquatic gastropod mollusks in the family Semisulcospiridae.

== Species ==
Species within the genus Hua include:

- Hua aristarchorum (Heude, 1889)
- Hua aubryana (Heude, 1889)
- Hua bailleti (Bavay & Dautzenberg, 1910)
- Hua chui (Wei, Yang & Wang, 2026)
- Hua diminuta (Boettger, 1887)
- Hua friniana (Heude, 1889)
- Hua funingensis L.-N. Du, Köhler, X.-Y. Chen & J.-X. Yang, 2019
- Hua jacqueti (Dautzenberg & H. Fischer, 1906)
- Hua jinshaensis (Wei, Yang & Wang, 2026)
- Hua kunmingensis L.-N. Du, Köhler, G.-H. Yu, X.-Y. Chen & J.-X. Yang, 2019
- Hua liuii L-N. Du, Köhler, G.-H. Yu, X.-Y. Chen & J.-X. Yang, 2019
- Hua luquanensis Pang et al., 2026
- Hua oreadarum (Heude, 1889)
- Hua praenotata (Gredler, 1884)
- Hua scrupea (Fulton, 1914)
- Hua tchangsii L-N. Du, Köhler, G.-H. Yu, X.-Y. Chen & J.-X. Yang, 2019
- Hua telonaria (Heude, 1889)
- Hua textrix (Heude, 1889)
- Hua toucheana (Heude, 1889)
- Hua vultuosa (Fulton, 1914)

Synonyms

- Hua (Namrutua) Abbott, 1948: synonym of Semisulcospira O. Böttger, 1886
- Hua leprosa (Heude, 1889): synonym of Hua telonaria (Heude, 1889) (junior synonym)
- Hua schmackeri (Böttger, 1886): synonym of Hua praenotata (Gredler, 1884) (junior synonym)
