= Semisulcospira ourense =

Conservation status
- Vulnerable (IUCN 3.1)

Scientific classification
- Kingdom: Animalia
- Phylum: Mollusca
- Class: Gastropoda
- Subclass: Caenogastropoda
- Family: Semisulcospiridae
- Genus: Semisulcospira
- Species: S. ourense

Binomial name
- Semisulcospira ourense Watanabe & Nishino, 1984

Species of gastropod

Semisulcospira ourense is a species of freshwater snail with an operculum, an aquatic gastropod mollusc in the family Semisulcospiridae.

== Distribution ==
This species occurs in Lake Biwa, Japan.
