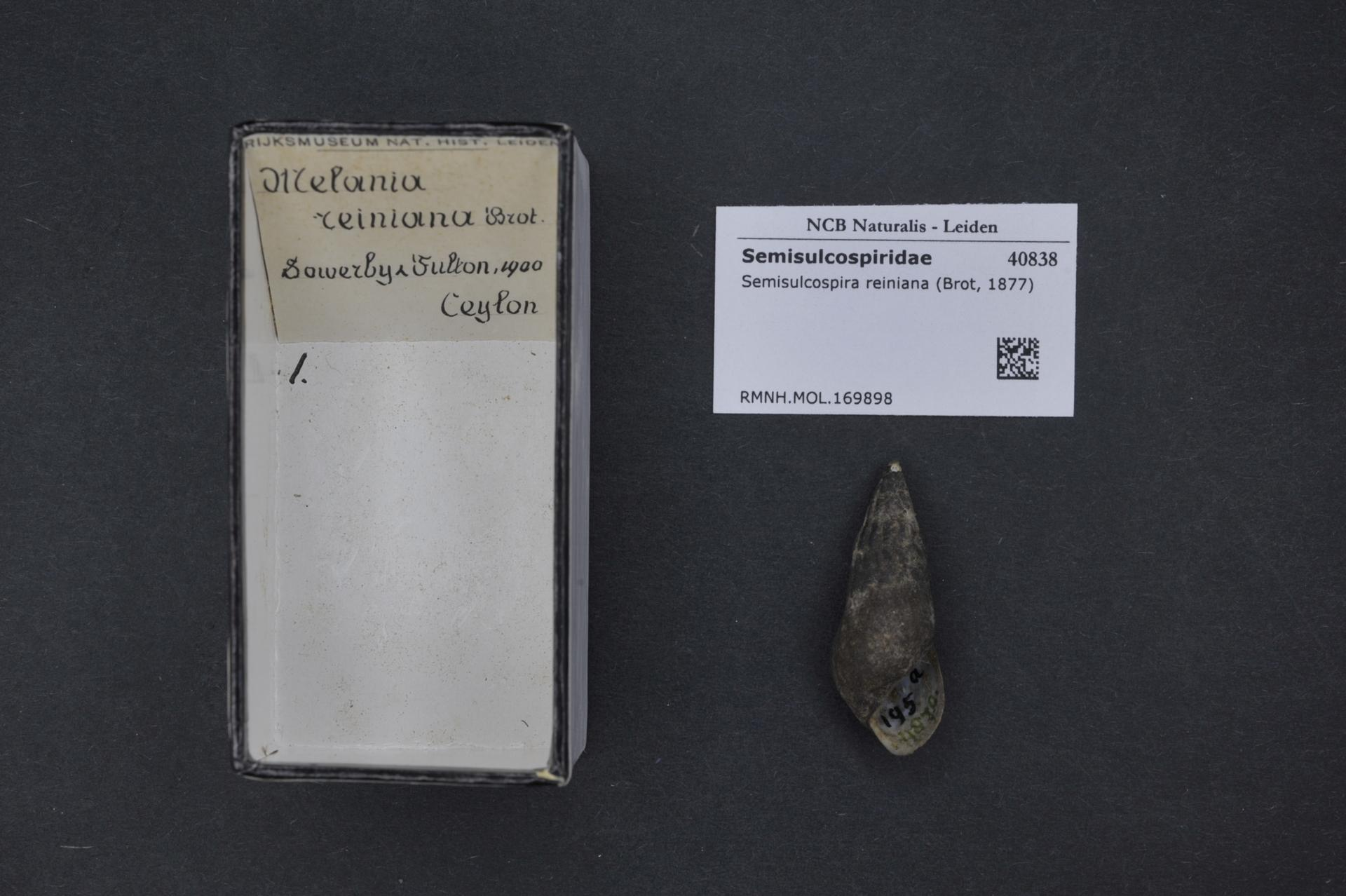
- Semisulcospira reiniana shell

Scientific classification
- Domain: Eukaryota
- Kingdom: Animalia
- Phylum: Mollusca
- Class: Gastropoda
- Subclass: Caenogastropoda
- Family: Semisulcospiridae
- Genus: Semisulcospira
- Species: S. reiniana

Binomial name
- Semisulcospira reiniana (Brot, 1876)

= Semisulcospira reiniana =

Species of gastropod

Semisulcospira reiniana is a species of freshwater snail with an operculum, an aquatic gastropod mollusk in the family Semisulcospiridae.

== Taxonomy ==
Semisulcospira reiniana belong to the Semisulcospira libertina species complex.

== Distribution ==
This species occurs in Japan.

== Parasites ==
Parasites of Semisulcospira reiniana include:

- Heterophyidae: Semisulcospira reiniana serves as the first intermediate host for Metagonimus yokogawai.
