= Halipegus eccentricus =

Scientific classification
- Kingdom: Animalia
- Phylum: Platyhelminthes
- Class: Trematoda
- Order: Plagiorchiida
- Family: Derogenidae
- Genus: Halipegus
- Species: H. eccentricus

Binomial name
- Halipegus eccentricus Thomas, 1939

Species of fluke

Halipegus eccentricus is a monoecious, digenea parasitic trematode commonly found in true frogs in North America. It was first described in 1939.

H. eccentricus is mainly found in the Eustachian tubes of a variety of frog species, its definitive host, although its life cycle involves other hosts, as is common for trematodes. Earlier research proposed that its life cycle involved two other species of hosts (ostracods and snails); however, subsequent research has revealed that the nymph form of the damselfly is also involved.

== Population dynamics and distribution ==
There is a positive correlation between numbers of H. eccentricus and frog size and age. The maximum infrapopulation density that a single frog can support is twelve, although most infected frogs have only five or six worms. Seasonal patterns of prevalence of the parasite in one of its intermediate hosts, Physa gyrina, have been observed to peak in May through July and to decline in autumn, which coincides with the decline of leaf litter.

== Morphology ==
The adult H. eccentricus is an orange-brown elongated worm approximately 6.0–6.5 mm (0.24–0.26 in) long and 1.8 mm (0.071 in) wide, with the greatest width at the posterior end. It has a subterminal oral sucker and a short esophagus. When laid, the eggs are fully embryonated, straw colored, and operculated. Each egg contains a single recurved filament. The cercariae are cystophorous, while the metacercariae have two flame cells, a large acetabulum, and a spiny cuticula with eight pen-shaped apical hooks, which are used to penetrate the snail intestines.

H. eccentricus can be differentiated from the related species H. occidualis depending on where the adult is found inside of frogs; H. eccentricus is found primarily in the Eustachian tubes whereas H. occidualis is found primarily in the esophagus and under the tongue. H. eccentricus overwinter in their amphibian hosts.

== Life cycle ==
Metamorphosed anurans become infected with H. eccentricus by feeding on metacercariae-infected damselflies or microcrustaceans (Cypridopsis sp.). Adult worms are released in the stomach of anurans, migrate to the Eustachian tubes within 32–39 days post-exposure (DPE), and release eggs into the feces 50-60 DPE. Physa gyrina or Planorbella trivolvis snails subsequently ingest the eggs. Inside of the snail intestine, the eggs undergo a series of development stages culminating in the cystophorous cercariae (32–35 DPE). The cercariae pass into the feces and infect copepod and ostracod microcrustaceans, the second intermediate hosts, where they develop in the hemocel into metacercariae. 15 to 19-day-old metacercariae from ostracods are infective to both damselfly larvae and metamorphosed anurans.
