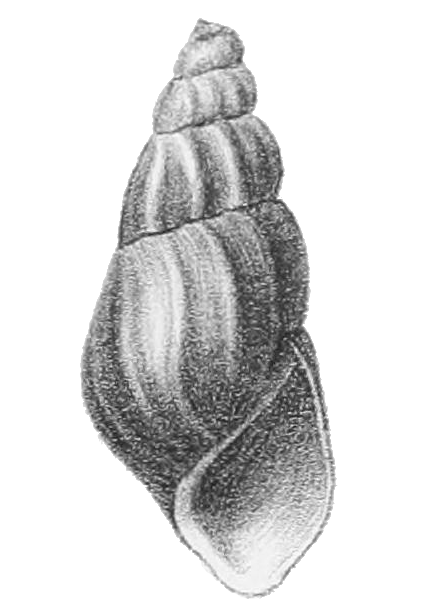
- Drawing on an apertural view of a shell of Semisulcospira forticosta

Scientific classification
- Kingdom: Animalia
- Phylum: Mollusca
- Class: Gastropoda
- Subclass: Caenogastropoda
- Order: incertae sedis
- Family: Semisulcospiridae
- Genus: Semisulcospira
- Species: S. forticosta

Binomial name
- Semisulcospira forticosta (Martens, 1886)

Synonyms
- Melania forticosta Martens, 1886

= Semisulcospira forticosta =

Species of gastropod

Semisulcospira forticosta is a species of freshwater snail with an operculum, an aquatic gastropod mollusk in the family Semisulcospiridae.

== Distribution ==
This species occurs in South Chungcheong Province, South Korea. The type locality is Mungyeong in Korea.

== Description ==
The female reproductive system was described by Prozorova & Rasshepkina in 2005.
