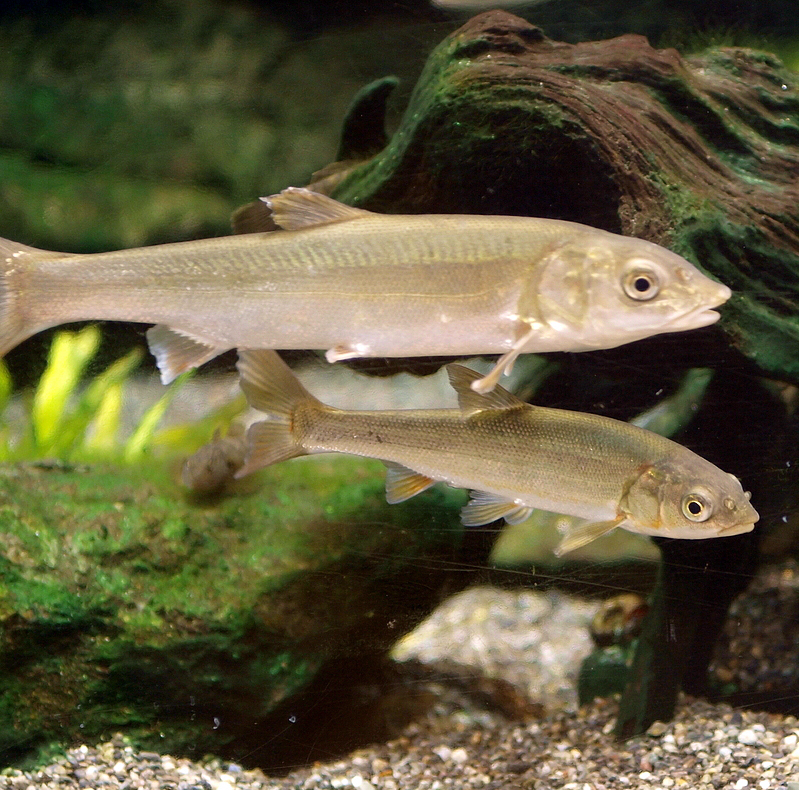

Conservation status
- Least Concern (IUCN 3.1)

Scientific classification
- Kingdom: Animalia
- Phylum: Chordata
- Class: Actinopterygii
- Order: Cypriniformes
- Family: Leuciscidae
- Genus: Pseudaspius
- Species: P. hakonensis

Binomial name
- Pseudaspius hakonensis (Günther, 1877)

Synonyms
- Leuciscus hakonensis, Günther 1877; Leuciscus hakuensis, Günther 1877; Tribolodon punctatum, Sauvage 1883; Tribolodon hakonensis, (Günther, 1877)

= Big-scaled redfin =

Species of fish

The big-scaled redfin (Pseudaspius hakonensis), also known as the Japanese dace and ugui (鯎 or 鵜喰), is a medium-sized Asian species of ray-finned fish belonging to the family Leuciscidae, which includes the daces, chubs, true minnows and related fishes. First described by Albert Günther in 1877 as Leuciscus hakonensis, it was the type specimen of the genus Tribolodon, having been described again as Tribolodon punctatum by Henri Émile Sauvage when he established that genus in 1883. It is the most widely distributed of the Pseudaspius species, found over much of the Sea of Japan. It is known to carry a number of parasites, including the trematode species Centrocestus armatus (for which it is a second intermediate host), and the copepod species Ergasilus fidiformis, which is carried in the fish's gills.

== Fishing ==
Dace are a popular sport fish species. They are known to put up a fight, and to be good for eating. They can be caught with a variety of methods, including float fishing, lure fishing, and legering. Fly fishing for dace using patterns that imitate small fry or invertebrates can be successful.

Dace grow to around 50 cm (20 in) and 2.3 kg (5 lb) or more, but the most common size caught are around 30 cm (1 ft) and 450 g (1 lb) or less and anything over 40 cm (16 in) and 900 g (2 lb) is considered a prize catch.

== See also ==
- cormorant
- Cormorant fishing
