= Cephalouterina =

Scientific classification
- Kingdom: Animalia
- Phylum: Platyhelminthes
- Class: Trematoda
- Order: Plagiorchiida
- Family: Lecithodendriidae
- Genus: Cephalouterina; Senger and Macy, 1953

Genus of flukes

Cephalouterina is a genus of trematodes within the family Lecithodendriidae under the order Plagiorchiida. Individuals of this genus are known to use amphibian hosts.

== Species ==
Species within the genus Cephalouterina include:

- Cephalouterina decamptodoni

== Ecology ==
Cephalouterina decamptodoni has been isolated within the amphibian host rough-skinned newt in British Columbia.
