= Semisulcospira multigranosa =

Scientific classification
- Domain: Eukaryota
- Kingdom: Animalia
- Phylum: Mollusca
- Class: Gastropoda
- Subclass: Caenogastropoda
- Family: Semisulcospiridae
- Genus: Semisulcospira
- Species: S. multigranosa

Binomial name
- Semisulcospira multigranosa (Boettger, 1886)

Species of gastropod

Semisulcospira multigranosa is a species of freshwater snail with an operculum, an aquatic gastropod mollusc in the family Semisulcospiridae.

== Ecology ==
Parasites of Semisulcospira multigranosa include trematode Aspidogaster conchicola.
