= Semisulcospira morii =

Conservation status
- Endangered (IUCN 3.1)

Scientific classification
- Kingdom: Animalia
- Phylum: Mollusca
- Class: Gastropoda
- Subclass: Caenogastropoda
- Order: incertae sedis
- Family: Semisulcospiridae
- Genus: Semisulcospira
- Species: S. morii

Binomial name
- Semisulcospira morii Watanabe, 1984

Species of gastropod

Semisulcospira morii is a species of freshwater snail with an operculum and is an aquatic gastropod mollusc in the family Semisulcospiridae.

== Distribution ==
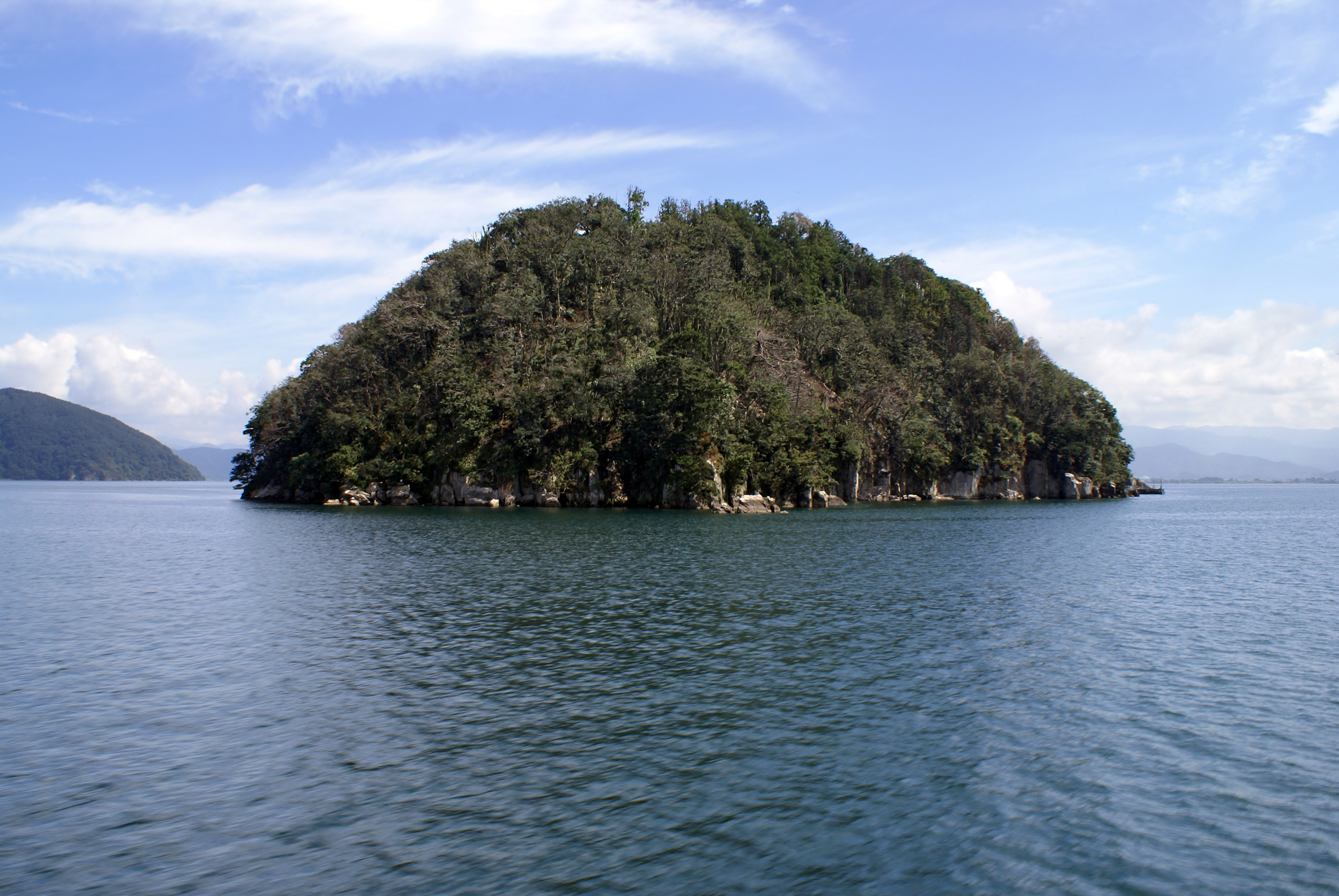
Chikubu Island around which Semisulcospira morii occurs.

This species is endemic to Lake Biwa, Japan. It appears only around Chikubu Island and Takeshima island.

== Ecology ==
Semisulcospira morii lives in habitats with rocky and gravel bottoms.
