= Genarchopsis goppo =

Scientific classification
- Kingdom: Animalia
- Phylum: Platyhelminthes
- Class: Trematoda
- Order: Plagiorchiida
- Family: Derogenidae
- Genus: Genarchopsis
- Species: G. goppo

Binomial name
- Genarchopsis goppo Ozaki, 1925

Species of fluke

Genarchopsis goppo is a species of trematode, or fluke worm, in the family Derogenidae.

Genarchopsis goppo was classified within the family Hemiuridae.

== Life cycle ==
The first intermediate hosts of Genarchopsis goppo include freshwater snails Amnicola travancorica and Semisulcospira libertina.

The second intermediate hosts include ostracods Stenocypris malcolmsoni, Eucyoris capensis, copepods Mesocyclops leuckarti, Thermocyclops hyalinus and Eucyclops sarrulatus.

Hosts of Genarchopsis goppo include fish: the spotted snakehead Channa punctata, Rhinogobius sp. and Odontobutis obscura.

Paratenic hosts include fish Aplocheilus panchax.
