= Carl Gottsche =

Carl Gottsche may refer to:

- Carl Moritz Gottsche (1808–1892), German physician and bryologist
- Carl Christian Gottsche (1855–1909), his son, German geologist
