= Semisulcospira pacificans =

Conservation status
- Data Deficient (IUCN 3.1)

Scientific classification
- Kingdom: Animalia
- Phylum: Mollusca
- Class: Gastropoda
- Subclass: Caenogastropoda
- Order: incertae sedis
- Family: Semisulcospiridae
- Genus: Semisulcospira
- Species: S. pacificans

Binomial name
- Semisulcospira pacificans (Heude, 1888)

Synonyms
- Melania pacificans Heude, 1888

Species of gastropod

Semisulcospira pacificans is a species of freshwater snail with an operculum, an aquatic gastropod mollusc in the family Semisulcospiridae.

== Distribution ==
This species occurs in Anhui Province and Zhejiang Province in Eastern China.

== Ecology ==
Semisulcospira pacificans lives in fluvial habitats.
