= Semisulcospira hongkongensis =

Conservation status
- Data Deficient (IUCN 3.1)

Scientific classification
- Kingdom: Animalia
- Phylum: Mollusca
- Class: Gastropoda
- Subclass: Caenogastropoda
- Order: incertae sedis
- Family: Semisulcospiridae
- Genus: Semisulcospira
- Species: S. hongkongensis

Binomial name
- Semisulcospira hongkongensis Brot, 1874

Species of gastropod

Semisulcospira hongkongensis is a species of freshwater snail with an operculum, an aquatic gastropod mollusc in the family Semisulcospiridae.

== Distribution ==
This species occurs in Anhui Province, Shanghai City, China.
