= Acanthatrium hitaensis =

Scientific classification
- Kingdom: Animalia
- Phylum: Platyhelminthes
- Class: Trematoda
- Order: Plagiorchiida
- Family: Lecithodendriidae
- Genus: Acanthatrium
- Species: A. hitaensis

Binomial name
- Acanthatrium hitaensis Koga, 1953

Synonyms
- Acanthatrium hitaense

Species of fluke

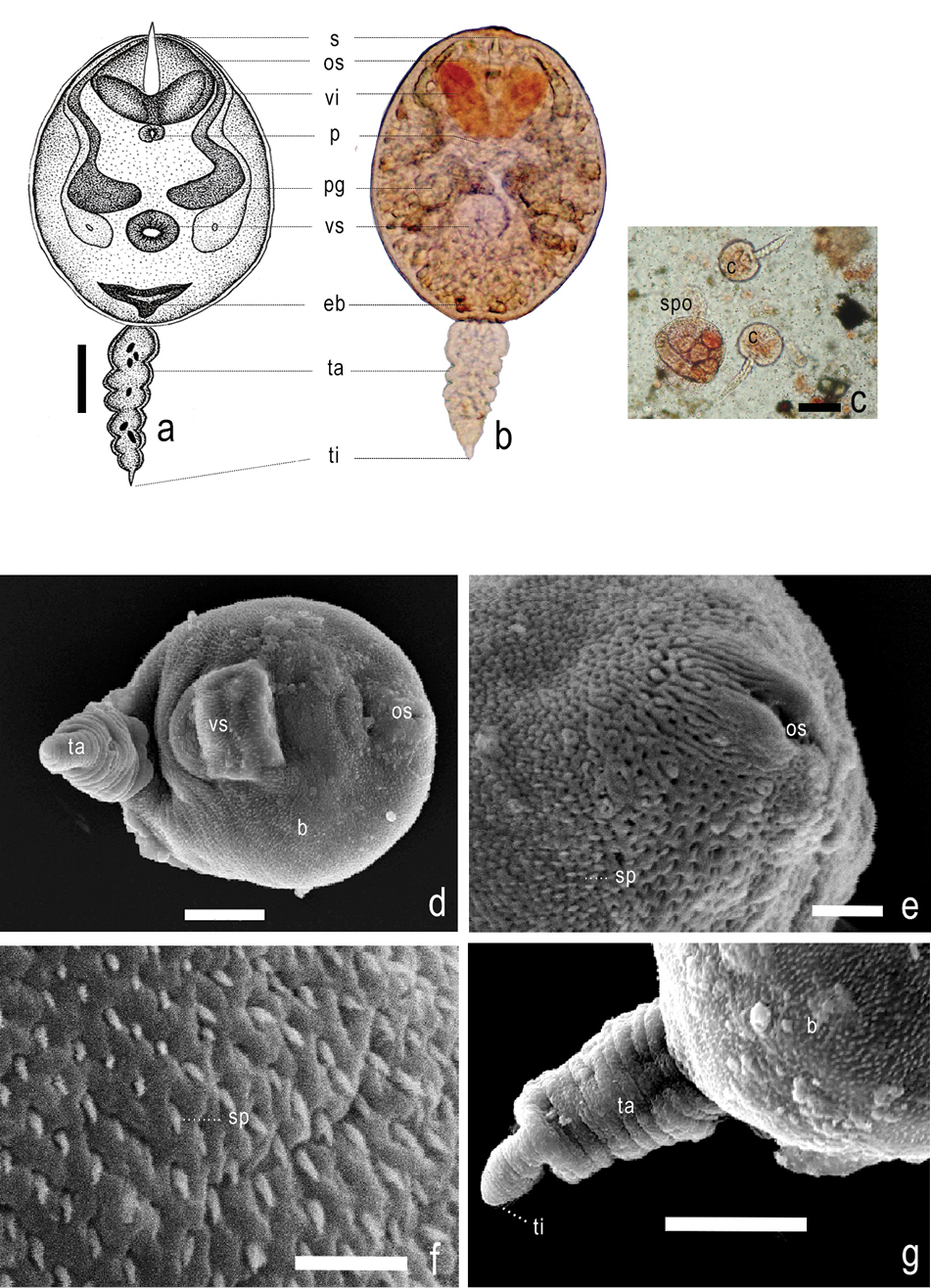

Acanthatrium hitaensis is a species of a trematode, or fluke worm, in the family Lecithodendriidae.

== Distribution ==
This species occurs in Japan and Thailand.

== Life cycle ==
The first intermediate hosts of Acanthatrium hitaensis include freshwater snails Semisulcospira libertina and Tarebia granifera.
