= Gredler =

Gredler is an Austrian surname. Notable people with the surname include:

- Ludwig Gredler (born 1967), Austrian biathlete
- Vinzenz Maria Gredler (1823–1912), Austrian naturalist
