= Philophthalmus lacrimosus =

Scientific classification
- Kingdom: Animalia
- Phylum: Platyhelminthes
- Class: Trematoda
- Order: Plagiorchiida
- Family: Philophthalmidae
- Genus: Philophthalmus
- Species: P. lacrimosus

Binomial name
- Philophthalmus lacrimosus Braun, 1902

Species of fluke

Philophthalmus lacrimosus is a species of trematodes in the family Philophthalmidae.

== Life cycle ==
Philophthalmus lacrimosus, as adults, parasitize the eyes of birds (definitive host). Eggs containing miracidia hatch in the water, miracidia penetrate snails (intermediate hosts) and develop into redia and cercariae. When the metacercariae encyst on surfaces of food for birds the infection of a new definitive host can take place by entering the eye or by oral intake.

== Human infections ==
Human cases of philophthalmosis have been reported in Yugoslavia, Israel, Asia (Thailand, Sri Lanka, Japan) and the Americas, specifically in Mexico and the United States.
