= Halipegus =

Scientific classification
- Kingdom: Animalia
- Phylum: Platyhelminthes
- Class: Trematoda
- Order: Plagiorchiida
- Family: Derogenidae
- Subfamily: Halipeginae
- Genus: Halipegus; Looss, 1899

Species
- See text

Genus of fluke

Halipegus is a genus of trematode in the family Derogenidae.

The status of H. eccentricus has been disputed. In 1998, it was suggested that it be regarded as a junior synonym of H. occidualis, but this was rejected in 1999.

== Species ==
The following species are accepted within Halipegus:

- Halipegus africanus Dollfus, 1950
- Halipegus alhaussaini Saoud & Roshdy, 1970
- Halipegus ambalensis Gupta & Chopra, 1987
- Halipegus barabankiensis Choudhary, Ray & Agrawal, 2019
- Halipegus bulla (Fain, 1953) Skrjabin & Gushanskaja, 1955
- Halipegus ctenopomi Jones, 1982
- Halipegus dubius Klein, 1905
- Halipegus eccentricus Thomas, 1939
- Halipegus eschi Zelmer & Brooks, 2000
- Halipegus ghanensis Fischthal & Thomas, 1968
- Halipegus insularis Capron, Deblock & Brygoo, 1961
- Halipegus japonicus Yamaguti, 1936
- Halipegus kimberleyana (Porter, 1938) Skrjabin & Guschanskaya, 1955
- Halipegus mehransis Srivastava, 1933
- Halipegus occidualis Stafford, 1905
- Halipegus ovocaudatus (Vulpian, 1859) Looss, 1899
- Halipegus perplexus Simer, 1929
- Halipegus phrynobatrachi Maeder, 1969
- Halipegus psilonotae Leon-Regagnon & Romero-Mayén, 2013
- Halipegus rhodesiensis Beverley-Burton, 1963
- Halipegus spindale Srivastava, 1933
- Halipegus tafonensis Meskal, 1970
- Halipegus udaipurensis Gupta & Agrawal, 1967
- Halipegus zweifeli Moravec & Sey, 1989
