= Liolope =

Scientific classification
- Kingdom: Animalia
- Phylum: Platyhelminthes
- Class: Trematoda
- Order: Diplostomida
- Family: Liolopidae
- Genus: Liolope; Cohn, 1902
- Species: L. copulans

Binomial name
- Liolope copulans Cohn, 1902

Genus of flukes

Liolope is a monotypic genus of trematodes, or fluke worms, belonging to the family Liolopidae. The only species is Liolope copulans.

Baba et al. (2011) classified this species in the family Liolopidae, superfamily Diplostomoidea.

== Distribution ==
This species occurs in Japan.

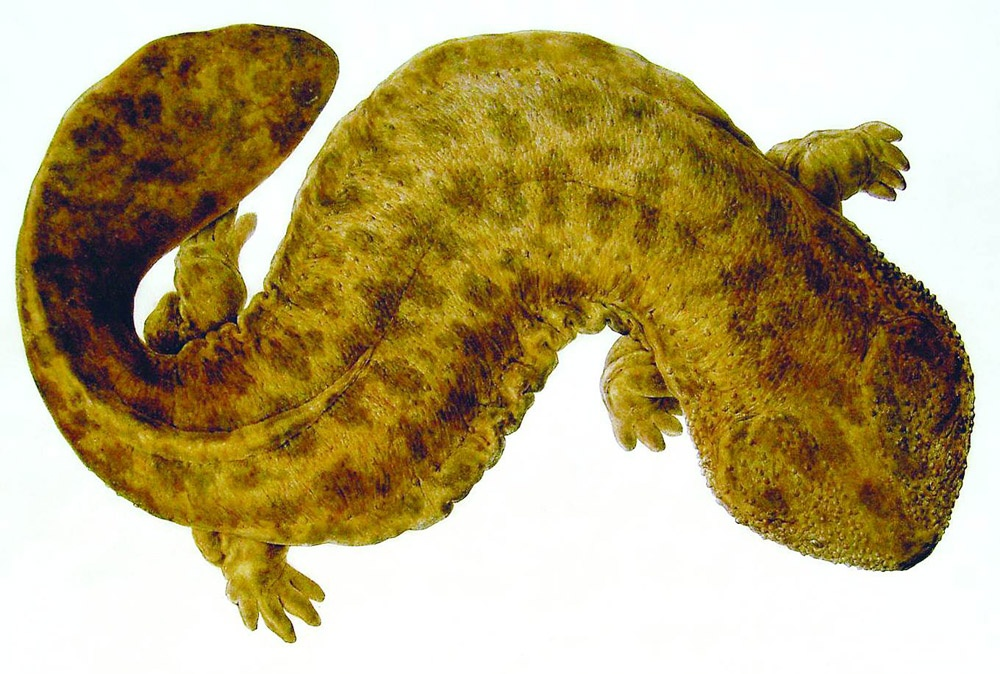
Japanese giant salamander is a host of this parasite.

== Life cycle ==
The first intermediate hosts of Liolope copulans include freshwater snails Semisulcospira libertina.

The second (experimental) intermediate host include fish Nipponocypris sieboldii and Rhynchocypris lagowskii.

The final hosts include Japanese giant salamander Andrias japonicus.
