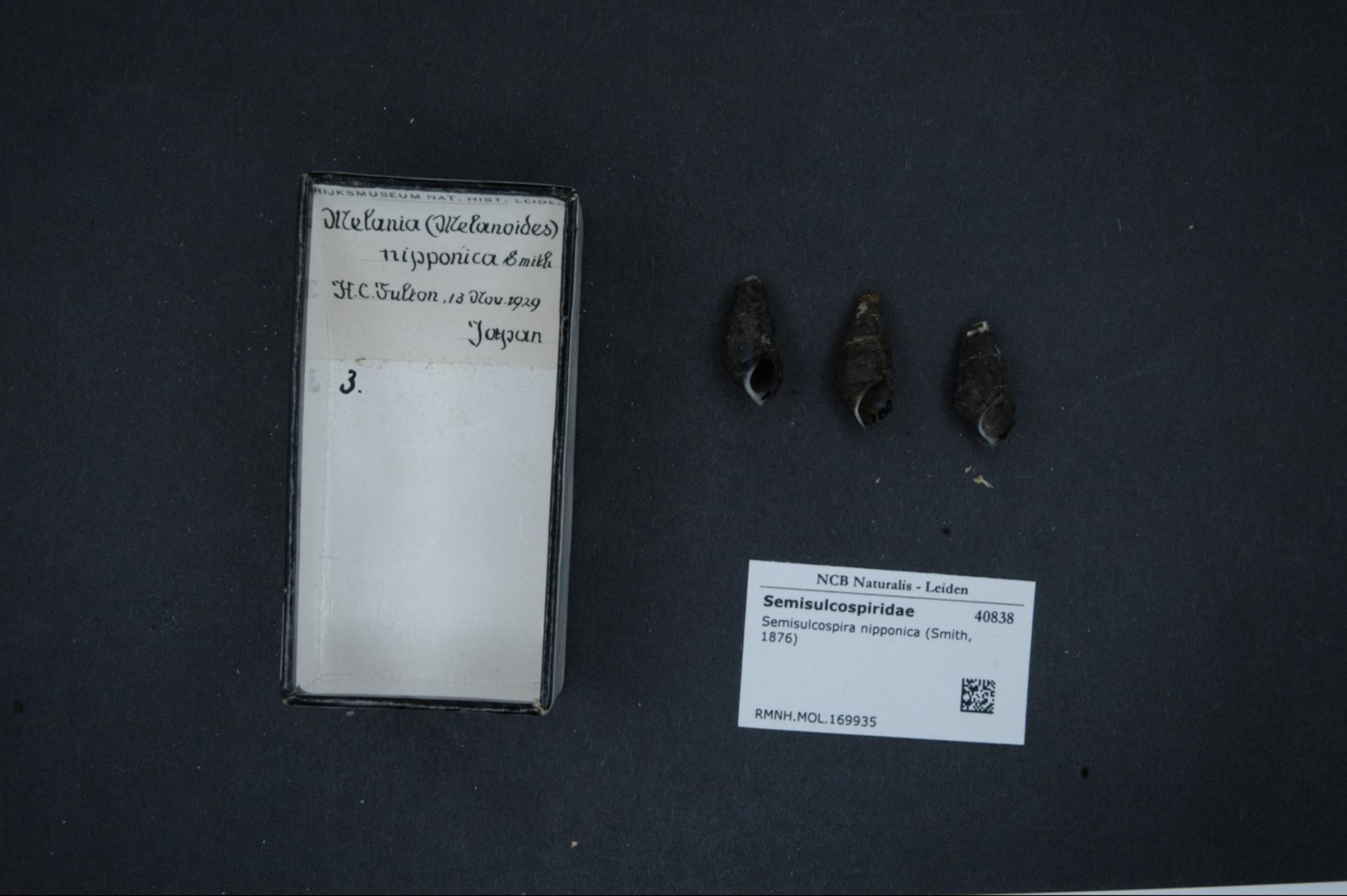
- Semisulcospira niponica shells

Conservation status
- Vulnerable (IUCN 3.1)

Scientific classification
- Kingdom: Animalia
- Phylum: Mollusca
- Class: Gastropoda
- Subclass: Caenogastropoda
- Order: incertae sedis
- Family: Semisulcospiridae
- Genus: Semisulcospira
- Species: S. niponica

Binomial name
- Semisulcospira niponica (Smith, 1876)

Synonyms
- Melania niponica Smith, 1876

= Semisulcospira niponica =

Species of gastropod

Semisulcospira niponica is a species of freshwater snail with an operculum, an aquatic gastropod mollusc in the family Semisulcospiridae.

== Distribution ==
This species occurs in the Lake Biwa, Japan.

== Ecology ==
Semisulcospira niponica lives in habitats with rocky bottom.
