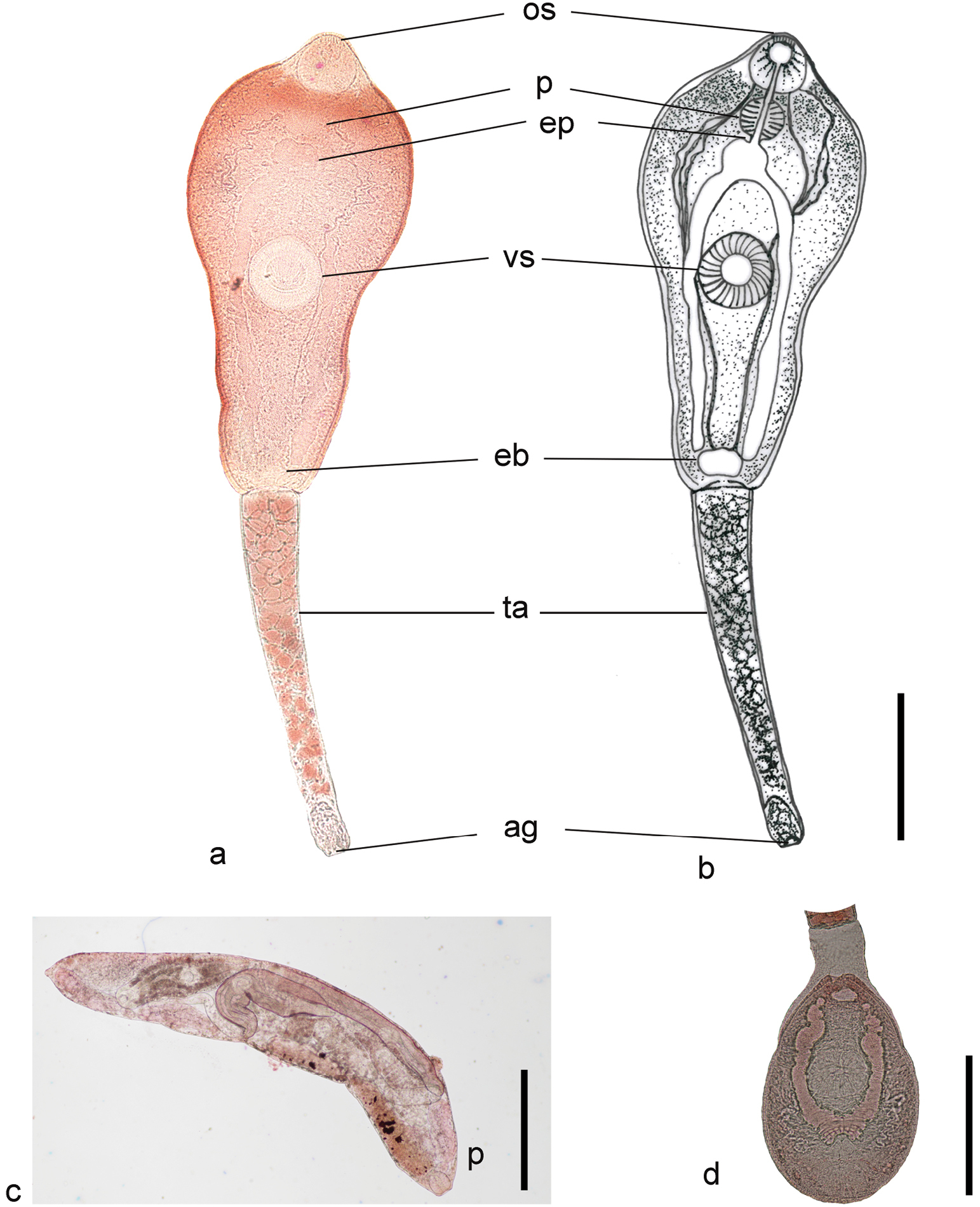

Scientific classification
- Domain: Eukaryota
- Kingdom: Animalia
- Phylum: Platyhelminthes
- Class: Trematoda
- Order: Plagiorchiida
- Family: Philophthalmidae
- Genus: Philophthalmus
- Species: P. gralli

Binomial name
- Philophthalmus gralli Mathis & Leger, 1910

= Philophthalmus gralli =

Species of fluke

Philophthalmus gralli, commonly known as the Oriental avian eye fluke, parasitises the conjunctival sac of the eyes of many species of birds, including birds of the orders Galliformes and Anseriformes. In Brazil this parasite was reported in native Anseriformes species. It was first discovered by Mathis and Leger in 1910 in domestic chickens from Hanoi, Vietnam. Birds are definitive hosts and freshwater snail species are intermediate hosts (e.g. Tarebia granifera and Melanoides tuberculata). Human cases of philophthalmosis are rare, but have been previously reported in Europe, Asia, and America (i.e., Yugoslavia, Sri Lanka, Japan, Israel, Mexico, and the United States).

== Life cycle ==
Philophthalmus gralli reaches sexual maturity in a bird and produces eggs. Fully embryonated eggs are shed into the water from the definitive host's eyes. Miracidium is induced to hatch when ripe eggs are released from the worm into water. Upon contact with a snail, the miracidium perforates the host epidermis with the aid of secretions and the anterior cilia. It penetrates the snail far enough to release a single rediae. The mother redia localizes in the heart and produces daughter rediae, which migrate to digestive glands to continue its development and produce megalurous cercariae. Cercariae are released from the snail and encyst on aquatic vegetation or other solid objects in the water. The definitive host, which is usually an aquatic bird, becomes infected upon ingestion of metacercariae. Excystment of the metacercariae occurs immediately upon reaching the mouth or crop of the bird and not in the stomach or intestine as in many other digenetic trematodes. Within three to five hours after ingestion, immature worms may be found in the esophagus, nasal passages, the orbit and the lobes of the lacrimal gland. Humans rarely serve as incidental hosts, but may do so when they ingest metacercariae on aquatic vegetation.

== Morphology ==
The P. gralli egg is nonoperculate and oval. The shell is thin and elastic and has an internal thickening at the small end.

The miracidia is composed of twenty epidermal plates arranged in four tiers, which have six, eight, four, and two cells, respectively. It consists of two excretory pores and two pairs of lateral sensory papillae.

The morphology of a redia is elongated and cylindrical. It has a well-developed anterior pharynx and a long intestinal tract. Birth pore is found between first and second quarter of body. Lateral processes are near posterior tip of body.

The cercaria has two suckers: a ventral sucker and rounded subterminal sucker. Intestinal ceca bifurcate posterior to pharynx. Excretory bladders are located at posterior end of the cercarial body.

The metacercarial cyst is elongated and oval-shaped with sensory papillae. The excysted metacercarial is oval-shaped with a subterminal sucker and a ventral sucker.

The adult form of P. gralli is fusiform shaped. Body surface is covered by small spines at acetabular region. The two suckers are orally and subterminally located. Pharynx is located immediately posterior to oral sucker. Acetabulum is located at anterior third level of body. Both female and male organs are found within the body.

== Therapy ==
The most common way to rid of Philophthalmus gralli is removal with forceps or flushing the worms out. Doramectin may also be used.

== Clinical symptoms ==
Clinical symptoms are a result of flukes attaching to the conjunctiva. It has different effects, depending on the host. Infection may cause congestion and erosion of the conjunctivae, conjunctivitis with persistent lacrimation, and semilunar fold swelling in chickens, ostriches, and humans, respectively.

=== Infections in ostriches ===
The first case of philophthalmiasis in captive-reared ostriches was described in the United States in 1980. An outbreak of Philophthalmus gralli has been reported in 2005 in ostriches in Zimbabwe; 17 were found to be infected by this parasite. They had swollen eyes, severe conjunctivitis, and constant lacrimation, accompanied by a purulent exudates. A fraction of the birds became semi-blind from the infection.

Philophthalmus gralli	PARASITE SUMMARY
Alternative Names:	Philopthalmus anatinus, Philopthalmus nyrocae
Description	Fluke
Systems affected	Eye - conjunctival sac.
Life cycle	Eggs escape from eye and mouth or nostrils of final host, hatch immediately after contact with water; cercariae develop in fresh-water immediately after contact with fresh-water prosobranch snail in 95 days after infection, encyst on surfaces shortly after emergence; metacercariae ingested by final host, make way to conjunctival sac, mature in 24–29 days after ingestion.
Geographic distribution	Vietnam, USA (Florida and Hawaii), Indochina, Formosa, Europe (USSR - Dnieper River) and Africa.
Associated Waterfowl Diseases	Ocular Fluke Infection (Philophthalmus gralli infection, Oriental eyefluke infection, Ocular trematode infection)
Waterfowl Disease Summary	Ocular infection due to a trematode (fluke).
