= Acanthatrium =

Scientific classification
- Domain: Eukaryota
- Kingdom: Animalia
- Phylum: Platyhelminthes
- Class: Trematoda
- Order: Plagiorchiida
- Family: Lecithodendriidae
- Genus: Acanthatrium; Faust, 1919

Genus of flatworms

Acanthatrium is a genus of flatworms belonging to the family Lecithodendriidae.

The species of this genus are found in Northern America.

Species:

- Acanthatrium anoplocami
- Acanthatrium atriopapillatum Capron, Deblock & Brygoo, 1961
- Acanthatrium hitaensis Koga, 1953
- Acanthatrium macracanthium
- Acanthatrium nycteridis Faust, 1919
- Acanthatrium oregonense
- Acanthatrium ovatum Yamaguti, 1939
- Acanthatrium sogandaresi Coil & Kuntz, 1958
- Acanthatrium sungi Matskasi, 1973
- Acanthatrium taiwanense Fischthal & Kuntz, 1975
- Acanthatrium tatrense Zdzitowiecki, 1967
