= Halipeginae =

Scientific classification
- Kingdom: Animalia
- Phylum: Platyhelminthes
- Class: Trematoda
- Order: Plagiorchiida
- Family: Derogenidae
- Subfamily: Halipeginae; Poche, 1926

Genera
- See text

Subfamily of fluke

Halipeginae is a subfamily of trematode in the family Derogenidae.

== Genera ==
The following genera are accepted within Halipeginae:

- Allogenarchopsis Urabe & Shimazu, 2013
- Allotangiopsis Yamaguti, 1971
- Anguillotrema Chin & Ku, 1974
- Arnola Strand, 1942
- Austrohalipegus Cribb, 1988
- Caudovitellaria Bilqees, Khalid & Talat, 2010
- Chenia Hsu, 1954
- Deropegus McCauley & Pratt, 1961
- Dollfuschella Vercammen-Grandjean, 1960
- Genarchella Travassos, Artigas & Pereira, 1928
- Genarchopsis Ozaki, 1925
- Halipegus Looss, 1899
- Magnibursatus Naidenova, 1969
- Monovitella Ataev, 1970
- Tangenarchopsis Urabe & Nakano, 2018
- Thometrema Amato, 1968
- Vitellotrema Guberlet, 1928
