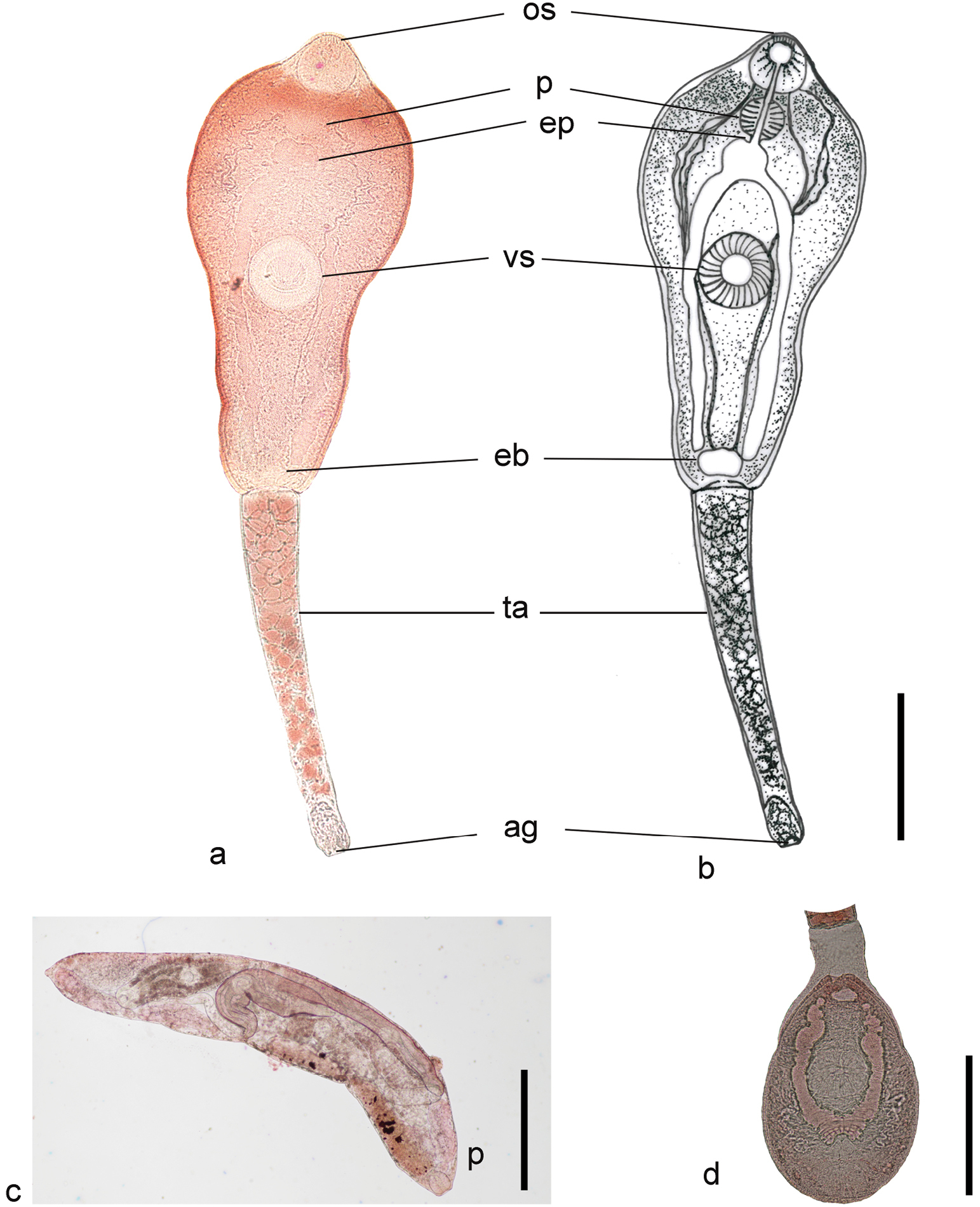
- Philophthalmus gralli

Scientific classification
- Kingdom: Animalia
- Phylum: Platyhelminthes
- Class: Trematoda
- Order: Plagiorchiida
- Family: Philophthalmidae
- Genus: Philophthalmus; Looss, 1899

= Philophthalmus =

Genus of flatworms

Philophthalmus is a genus of trematodes belonging to the family Philophthalmidae.

The species of this genus are found in America and Australia.

Species:

- Philophthalmus andersoni Dronen & Penner, 1975;
- Philophthalmus attenuatus Bennett & Presswell, 2019;
- Philophthalmus coturnicola Gvosdev, 1951;
- Philophthalmus cupensis Richter, Vrazic & Aleraj, 1953;
- Philophthalmus distomatosa Radev, Kanev & Gold, 2000;
- Philophthalmus gralli Mathis & Leger, 1910;
- Philophthalmus hegeneri Penner & Fried, 1963;
- Philophthalmus hovorkai Busa, 1956;
- Philophthalmus lacrimosus Braun, 1902;
- Philophthalmus lucipetus (Rudolphi, 1819);
- Philophthalmus megalurus;
- Philophthalmus muraschkinzewi Tretiakova, 1946;
- Philophthalmus nocturnus Looss, 1907;
- Philophthalmus nyrocae Yamaguti, 1934;
- Philophthalmus oschmarini Shigin, 1957;
- Philophthalmus palpebrarum Looss, 1899;
- Philophthalmus posaviniensis Richter, Vrazic & Aleraj, 1953;
- Philophthalmus rhionica Tichomirov, 1976;
- Philophthalmus skrjabini Efimov, 1937;
- Philophthalmus stercusmuscarum;
- Philophthalmus stugii Iskova, 1967;
- Philophthalmus zalophi Dailey, Perrin & Parás, 2005.
