= Carl Christian Gottsche =

German geologist (1855–1909)

Carl Christian Gottsche (1 March 1855 – 11 October 1909) was a German geologist. He is known for geological investigations of Schleswig-Holstein and neighboring regions.

Gottsche was born in Altona, Duchy of Holstein, Denmark. He studied geology at the University of Würzburg and the Ludwig-Maximilians-Universität München, obtaining his doctorate in 1878 with a thesis on Jurassic fossils from the Argentine Cordillera. In 1880, he became an assistant at the mineralogical institute at Kiel University, receiving his habilitation the same year with a dissertation on sedimentary-drift in the province of Schleswig-Holstein.

In 1881, he relocated to Japan, where he was tasked with completing the establishment of a mineralogical-geological institute at the University of Tokyo. At the university he also gave lectures. For much of 1884, he conducted research in Korea, afterwards returning to Germany, where in 1886 he was appointed curator of the mineralogical-geological department of the Natural History Museum in Hamburg. In 1900, he attained the title of professor, later becoming director of the mineralogical-geological institute (1907).

He was the son of botanist Carl Moritz Gottsche (1808–1892).

== Taxa named in honor ==
Taxa named in honor of Carl Christian Gottsche include:

- Semisulcospira gottschei (Martens, 1886)

== Written works ==
- Ueber jurassische Versteinerungen aus der argentinischen Cordillere (graduation thesis).
- Die sedimentärgeschiebe der Provinz Schleswig-Holstein (habilitation thesis).
- Die Mollusken-Fauna des Holsteiner Gesteins, 1887 - Mollusks found in Holstein rock formations.
- Kreide und Tertiär bei Hemmoor in Nord-Hannover, 1889 - Chalk and Tertiary near Hemmoor in North Hanover.
