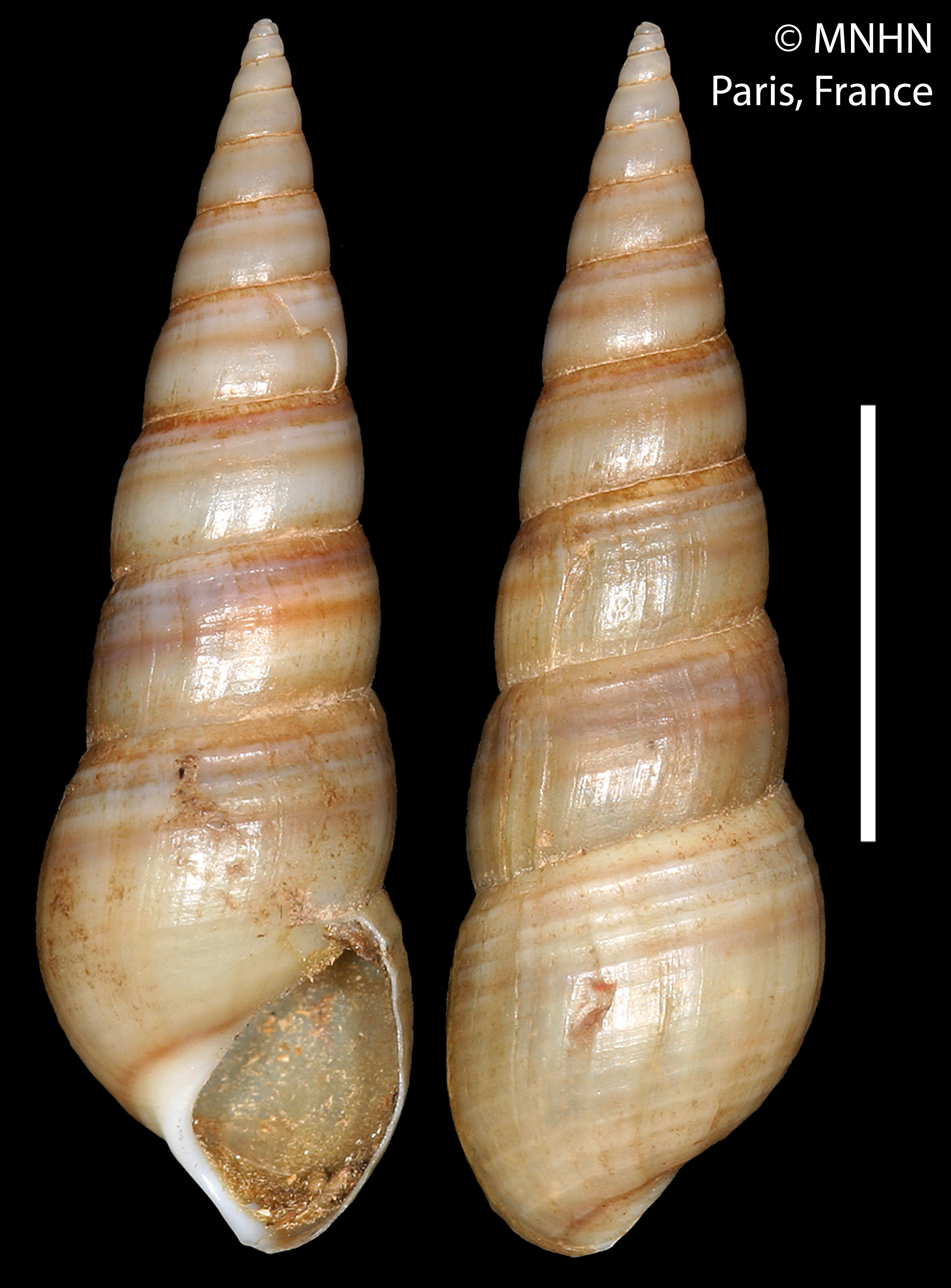
- Shell of Semisulcospira pleuroceroides (lectotype at MNHN, Paris)

Scientific classification
- Kingdom: Animalia
- Phylum: Mollusca
- Class: Gastropoda
- Subclass: Caenogastropoda
- Order: incertae sedis
- Superfamily: Cerithioidea
- Family: Semisulcospiridae
- Genus: Semisulcospira; Boettger, 1886

Type species
- Melania libertina A. Gould, 1859

Synonyms
- Biwamelania Matsuoka, 1985; Brotia (Senckenbergia) Yen, 1939 (junior synonym); Hua (Namrutua) Abbott, 1948; Melania (Semisulcospira) O. Boettger, 1886 (original rank); Namrutua Abbott, 1948 (junior synonym); Semisulcospira (Biwamelania) Matsuoka, 1985 · alternate representation; Semisulcospira (Semisulcospira) O. Boettger, 1886 · alternate representation; Senckenbergia Yen, 1939 (junior synonym)

= Semisulcospira =

Genus of gastropods

Semisulcospira is a genus of freshwater snails with an operculum, an aquatic gastropod molluscs in the family Semisulcospiridae.

Species in the genus Semisulcospira are viviparous.

== Species ==
Species within the genus Semisulcospira include:

- Semisulcospira arenicola Watanabe & Nishino, 1995
- Semisulcospira calculus (Reeve, 1859)
- Semisulcospira coreana (Martens, 1886)
- Semisulcospira crassicosta Y.-Y. Liu, Y.-X. Wang & Y.-H. Duan, 1994
- Semisulcospira davisi Sawada & Nakano, 2021
- Semisulcospira decipiens (Westerlund, 1883)
- Semisulcospira diminuta Gredler, 1887
- Semisulcospira dilatata Watanabe & Nishino, 1995
- † Semisulcospira fiscina (Yokoyama, 1932)
- Semisulcospira fluvialis Watanabe & Nishino, 1995
- Semisulcospira forticosta (Martens, 1886)
- Semisulcospira fuscata Watanabe & Nishino, 1995
- † Semisulcospira gamoensis Matsuoka & Miura, 2019
- Semisulcospira gottschei (Martens, 1886)
- Semisulcospira gredleri (Boettger, 1886)
- Semisulcospira habei Davis, 1969
  - Semisulcospira habei yamaguchi Davis, 1969
- Semisulcospira hongkongensis Brot, 1874
- † Semisulcospira kokubuensis Matsuoka & Miura, 2018
- Semisulcospira kurodai Kajiyama & Habe, 1961
- Semisulcospira libertina (Gould, 1859)
- Semisulcospira marica Y.-Y. Liu, Y.-X. Wang & W.-Z. Zhang, 1994
- Semisulcospira morii Watanabe, 1984
- Semisulcospira multigranosa (Boettger, 1886)
- † Semisulcospira nagiensis (Matsuoka & Taguchi, 2013)
- † Semisulcospira nakamurai Matsuoka & Miura, 2018
- Semisulcospira nakasekoae Kuroda, 1929
- Semisulcospira ningpoensis (I. Lea, 1857)
- Semisulcospira niponica (Smith, 1876)
- † Semisulcospira nojirina Matsuoka & Miura, 2019
- Semisulcospira ourense Watanabe & Nishino, 1984
- Semisulcospira pacificans (Heude, 1888)
- Semisulcospira pleuroceroides (Bavay & Dautzenberg, 1910)
- † Semisulcospira praemultigranosa Matsuoka, 1985
- † Semisulcospira pseudomultigranosa Matsuoka & Miura, 2018
- † Semisulcospira pusilla Matsuoka & Miura, 2018
- Semisulcospira reiniana (Brot, 1876)
- Semisulcospira reticulata Kajiyama & Habe, 1961
- † Semisulcospira reticulataformis Matsuoka & Miura, 2019
- Semisulcospira rugosa Watanabe & Nishino, 1995
- Semisulcospira shiraishiensis Watanabe & Nishino, 1995
- † Semisulcospira spinulifera Matsuoka & Miura, 2018
- † Semisulcospira tagaensis Matsuoka & Miura, 2019
- Semisulcospira takeshimensis Watanabe & Nishino, 1995
- Semisulcospira tegulata (Martens, 1894)
- Semisulcospira trachea (Westerlund, 1883)

"Semisulcospira libertina species complex" consist of four species: Semisulcospira libertina, Semisulcospira reiniana, Semisulcospira kurodai and Semisulcospira trachea.

Synonyms

- Semisulcospira dolichostoma Annandale, 1924: synonym of Koreoleptoxis dolichostoma (Annandale, 1924) (original combination)
- Semisulcospira inflata Tchang, 1949: synonym of Hua textrix (Heude, 1889) (junior synonym)
- Semisulcospira paludiformis Yen, 1939: synonym of Sulcospira paludiformis (Yen, 1939) (original combination)
- Semisulcospira paucicincta (E. von Martens, 1894): synonym of Semisulcospira calculus (Reeve, 1859) (junior synonym)
- † Semisulcospira recticancellata Kobayashi & Suzuki, 1939: synonym of † Pachychilus recticancellata (Kobayashi & Suzuki, 1939)
- Semisulcospira trivolvis Yen, 1939: synonym of Sulcospira paludiformis (Yen, 1939) (possible synonym)

== Ecology ==
Semisulcospira snails predate also on eggs of bluegill Lepomis macrochirus.

== Uses ==
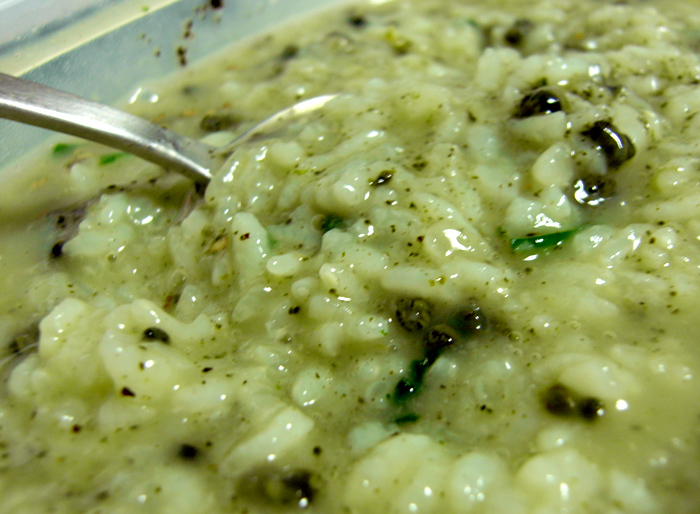
A bowl of Korean take-out olgaengi (melanian snail) juk.

Semisulcospira snails are used in some forms of cuisine. In Korean cuisine, they are used to flavor a type of congee (juk), called olgaengi juk.
