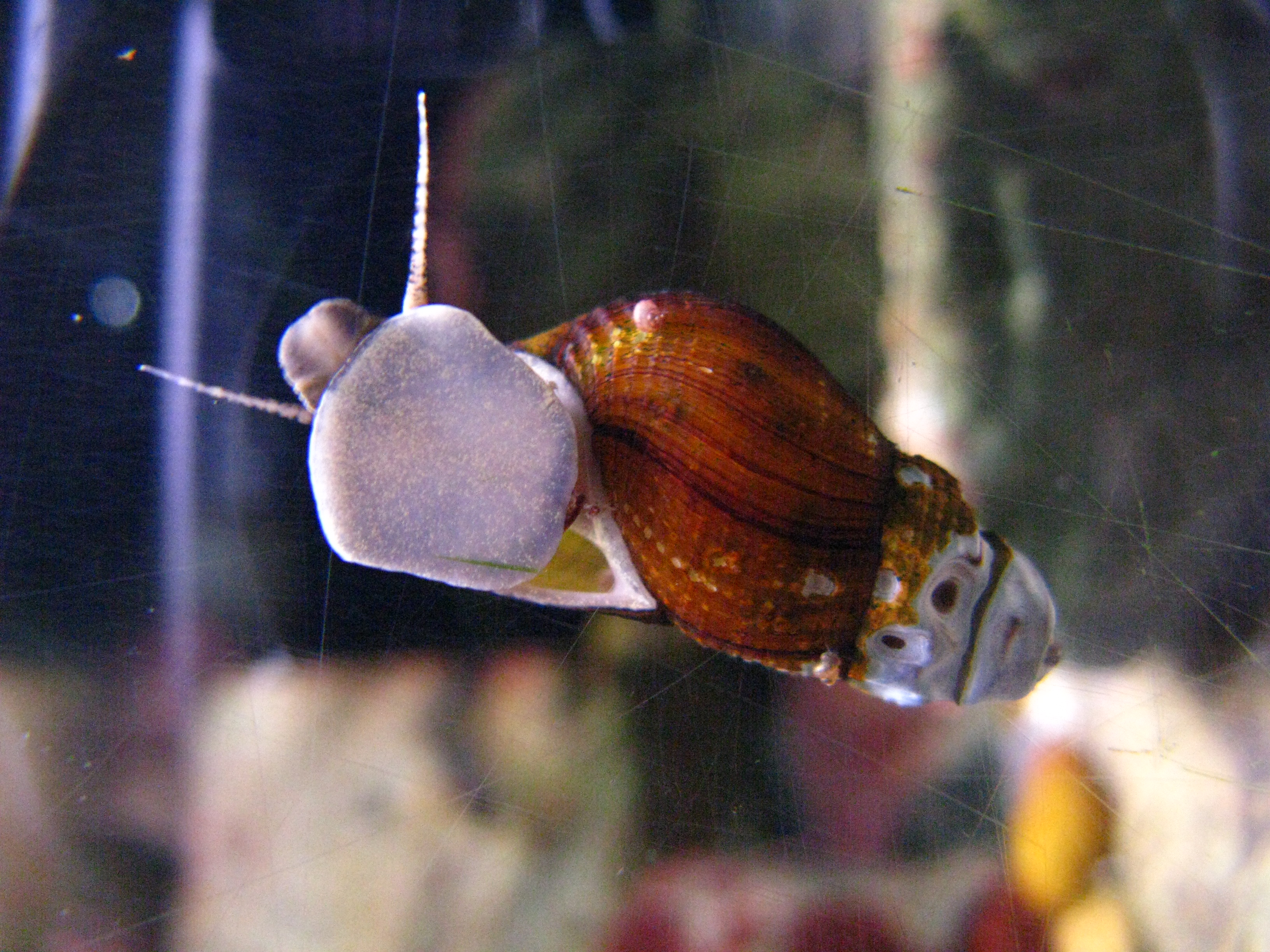
- A live individual of Semisulcospira kurodai viewed through the glass of an aquarium

Scientific classification
- Kingdom: Animalia
- Phylum: Mollusca
- Class: Gastropoda
- Subclass: Caenogastropoda
- Order: incertae sedis
- Family: Semisulcospiridae
- Genus: Semisulcospira
- Species: S. kurodai

Binomial name
- Semisulcospira kurodai Kajiyama & Habe, 1961

= Semisulcospira kurodai =

Species of gastropod

Semisulcospira kurodai is a species of freshwater snail with an operculum, an aquatic gastropod mollusc in the family Semisulcospiridae. Before 2009, this species was classified in the family Pleuroceridae.

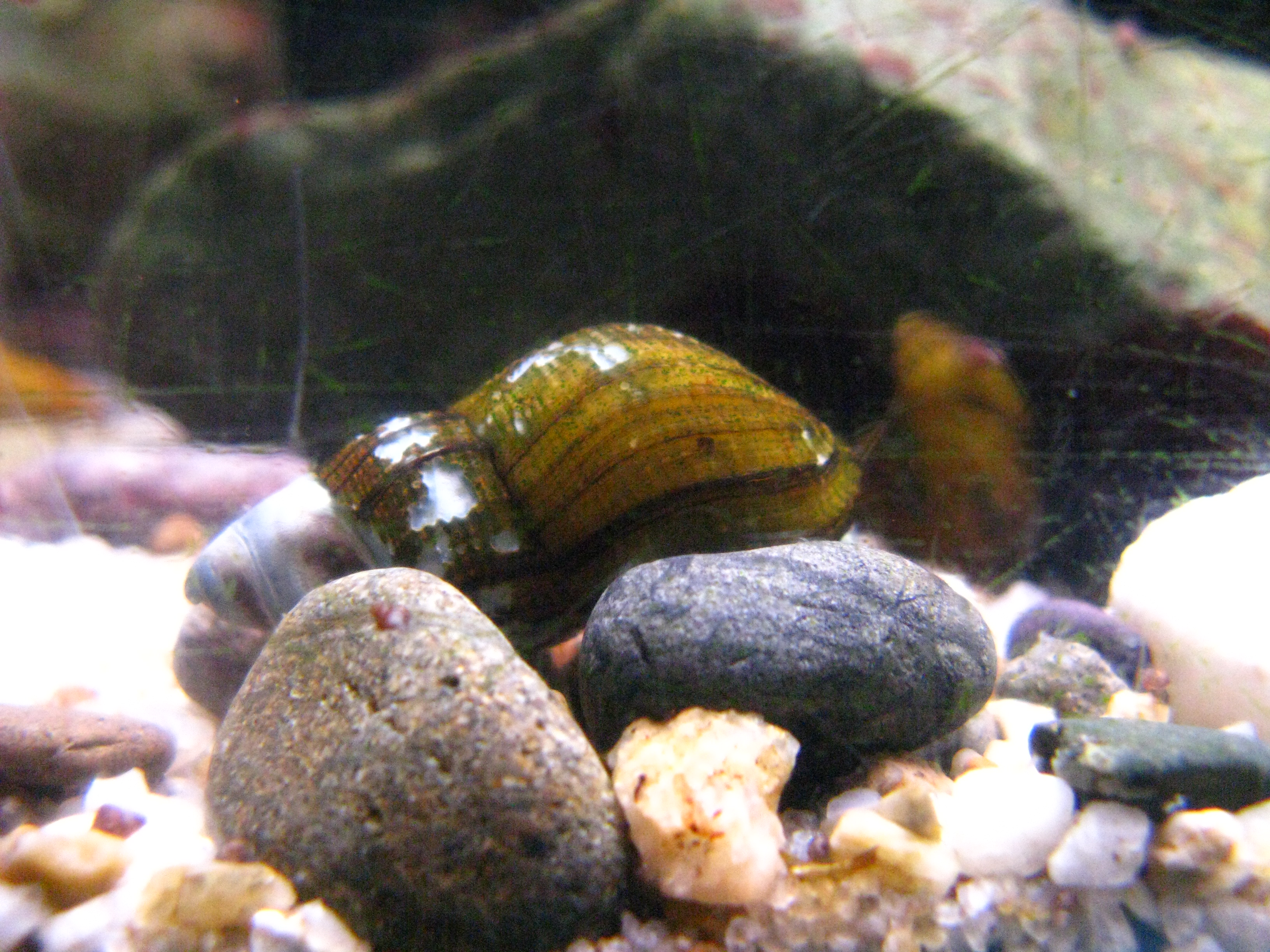
Semisulcospira kurodai

== Description ==
The maximum width of the shell of Semisulcospira kurodai is 13.3 millimetres (0.52 in) and 52.0 millimetres (2.05 in) in height in the laboratory. The maximum weight of the animal in the laboratory is 7.7 grams (0.27 oz).

The width of the shell is 10.3 millimetres (0.41 in) in the first year, 11.0 millimetres (0.43 in) in the second year, 11.5 to 11.8 millimetres (0.45 to 0.46 in) in the third year and 12.0 millimetres (0.47 in) in the fourth year in the laboratory.

The diploid chromosome number of Semisulcospira kurodai is 2n=35 and 2n=36 (both chromosome numbers were observed).

== Distribution ==
This species occurs in Japan.

== Ecology ==
=== Habitat ===
Semisulcospira kurodai lives in rivers and in ponds.

=== Life cycle ===
The female has 17 to 72 embryos in its brood pouch. One female can give life to 62 to 79 newborn snails in the laboratory.

The average size of the shell of a newborn snail varies according to the locality from 1.2 to 1.4 millimetres (0.047 to 0.055 in) in width and from 1.9 to 2.1 millimetres (0.075 to 0.083 in) in the height of the shell.

Semisulcospira kurodai can live up to four years in the laboratory.
