= Centrocestus armatus =

Scientific classification
- Kingdom: Animalia
- Phylum: Platyhelminthes
- Class: Trematoda
- Order: Plagiorchiida
- Family: Heterophyidae
- Genus: Centrocestus
- Species: C. armatus

Binomial name
- Centrocestus armatus (Tanabe, 1922)

Species of fluke

Centrocestus armatus is a species of trematodes, or fluke worms, in the family Heterophyidae.

== Distribution ==
This species occurs in Japan, Taiwan, Korea, Southeast Asia.

== Life cycle ==
The first intermediate hosts of Centrocestus armatus include freshwater snails Semisulcospira libertina.

The second intermediate hosts include fish Nipponocypris temminkii and Zacco platypus.

The final hosts include black-crowned night heron Nycticorax nycticorax.

It may infect humans.
