= Philophthalmidae =

Scientific classification
- Kingdom: Animalia
- Phylum: Platyhelminthes
- Class: Trematoda
- Order: Plagiorchiida
- Suborder: Echinostomata
- Superfamily: Echinostomatoidea
- Family: Philophthalmidae; Looss, 1899

Family of flukes

Philophthalmidae is a family of trematodes in the order Plagiorchiida.

== Genera ==
- Cloacitrema Yamaguti, 1935
- Echinostephilla Lebour, 1909
- Parorchis Nicoll, 1907
- Philophthalmus Looss, 1899
  - Philophthalmus gralli Mathis & Leger, 1910
  - Philophthalmus lacrimosus Braun, 1902
- Pittacium Szidat, 1939
- Pygorchis Looss, 1899
- Skrjabinovermis Belopolskaya, 1954
