= Liolopidae =

Scientific classification
- Kingdom: Animalia
- Phylum: Platyhelminthes
- Class: Trematoda
- Order: Diplostomida
- Family: Liolopidae

Family of flukes

Liolopidae is a family of trematodes belonging to the order Diplostomida.

Genera:

- Dracovermis Brooks & Overstreet, 1978
- Harmotrema Nicoll, 1914
- Liolope Cohn, 1902
