= Derogenidae =

Scientific classification
- Kingdom: Animalia
- Phylum: Platyhelminthes
- Class: Trematoda
- Order: Plagiorchiida
- Suborder: Hemiurata
- Superfamily: Hemiuroidea
- Family: Derogenidae; Nicoll, 1910

Genera
- See text

Family of flukes

Derogenidae is a family of trematodes belonging to the order Plagiorchiida.

== Subdivisions ==
Derogenidae contains 22 genera arranged in two subfamilies, with one being unassigned.

- Subfamily Derogeninae Nicoll, 1910
  - Derogenes Lühe, 1900
  - Gonocercella Manter, 1940
  - Leurodera Linton, 1910
  - Progonus Looss, 1899
- Subfamily Halipeginae Poche, 1926
  - Allogenarchopsis Urabe & Shimazu, 2013
  - Allotangiopsis Yamaguti, 1971
  - Anguillotrema Chin & Ku, 1974
  - Arnola Strand, 1942
  - Austrohalipegus Cribb, 1988
  - Caudovitellaria Bilqees, Khalid & Talat, 2010
  - Chenia Hsu, 1954
  - Deropegus McCauley & Pratt, 1961
  - Dollfuschella Vercammen-Grandjean, 1960
  - Genarchella Travassos, Artigas & Pereira, 1928
  - Genarchopsis Ozaki, 1925
  - Halipegus Looss, 1899
  - Magnibursatus Naidenova, 1969
  - Monovitella Ataev, 1970
  - Tangenarchopsis Urabe & Nakano, 2018
  - Thometrema Amato, 1968
  - Vitellotrema Guberlet, 1928
- Derogenoides Nicoll, 1913 (subfamily not assigned)
