= Vinzenz Maria Gredler =

Austrian naturalist (1823-1912)

Vinzenz Maria Gredler (30 September 1823, in Telfs near Innsbruck – 4 May 1912, in Bozen) was an Austrian naturalist.

Gredler, who was a Dominican friar, first studied classics (1835–1841) then philosophy and theology (1842–1848). He then studied natural sciences at the Gymnasium in Halle (1848–1849). Without other qualifications, he succeeded in gaining a natural history diploma. He then served as director of the Franciscan Gymnasium in Bozen from 1849 to 1901.

Gredler wrote 338 publications on various subjects: geology, mineralogy, botany, zoology (mammals, birds, reptiles, amphibians, molluscs, insects), art, anthropology, history, etc. He made numerous excursions in the Tyrol and had a rich natural history collection with the aid of the other seminarists and his pupils. This is today conserved in the museum of the Gymnasium of Bolzano (or Museo Tirolese di Scienze Naturali del Ginnasio dei Padri Francescani).

The scientific journal "Gredleriana" is named in his honor.

== Bibliography ==
- Gredler V. M. 1853. Bemerkungen über einige Conchylien der Gattungen Pupa und Pomatias. Programm des Gymnasiums von Bozen 3: 45-52.
- Gredler V. 1856. Tirol’s Land- und Süsswasser-Conchylien I. Die Landconchylien.. Verhandlungen des Zoologisch-Botanischen Vereins in Wien, (Abhandlungen) 6: 25-162, 2 tables, Bozen.
- 1856. Die Ameisen Tirol’s. Bozen
- 1863. Die Käfer von Tirol nach ihrer horizontalen und vertikalen Verbreitung. Bozen.
- 1868. Die Urgletscher-Moränen aus dem Eggenthale. Bozen.
- Gredler V. 1877. Mittheilungen aus dem Gebiete der Malakozoologie. Nachrichtsblatt der Deutschen Malakozoologischen Gesellschaft 9 (1): 1-6. Frankfurt am Main.
- 1893. Zur Conchylien-Fauna von China. Bozen.
- 1895. Die Porphyre der Umgebung von Bozen und ihre mineralogischen Einschlüsse. Bozen
