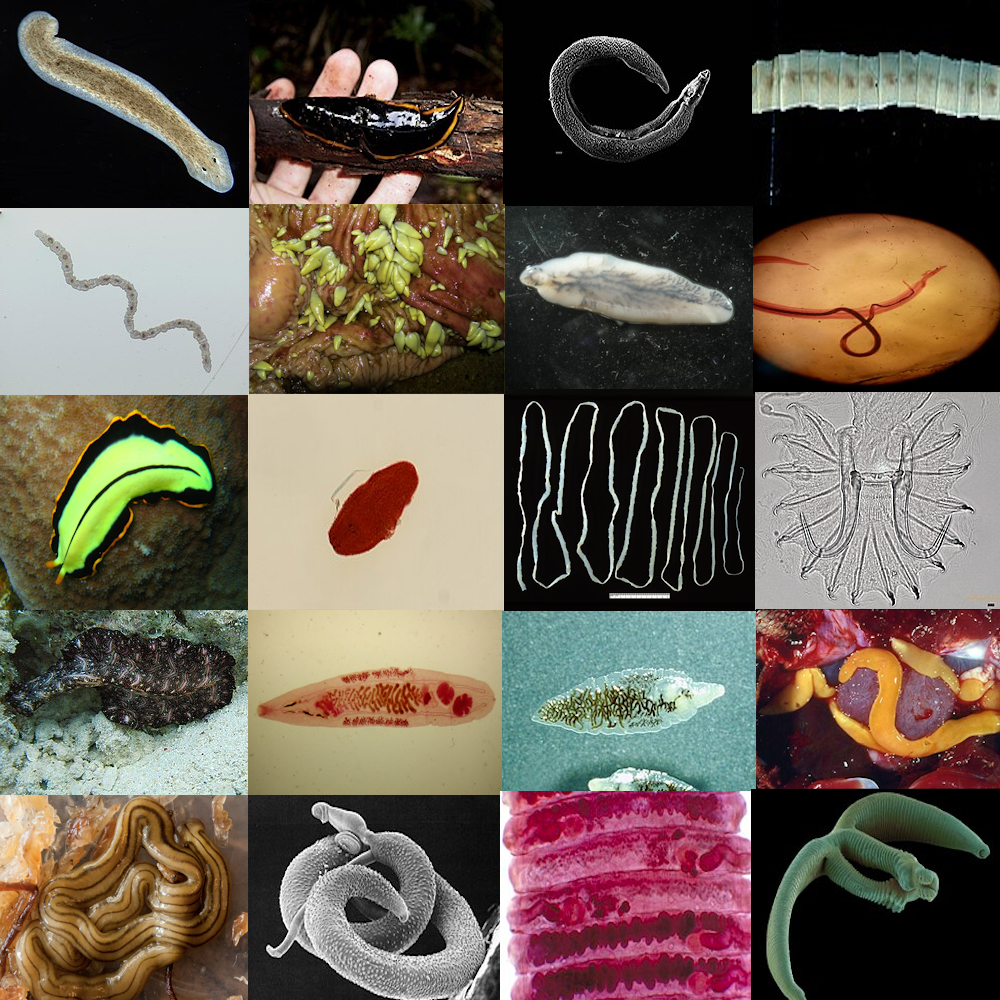

Scientific classification
- Kingdom: Animalia
- Phylum: Platyhelminthes
- Class: Trematoda
- Order: Plagiorchiida
- Suborder: Xiphidiata
- Superfamily: Microphalloidea
- Family: Lecithodendriidae; Lühe, 1901

= Lecithodendriidae =

Family of flatworms

Lecithodendriidae is a family of flatworms belonging to the order Plagiorchiida.

== Genera ==
Genera:

- Acanthatrium Faust, 1919
- Brandesia Stossich, 1899
- Brenesia Caballero & Caballero, 1969
