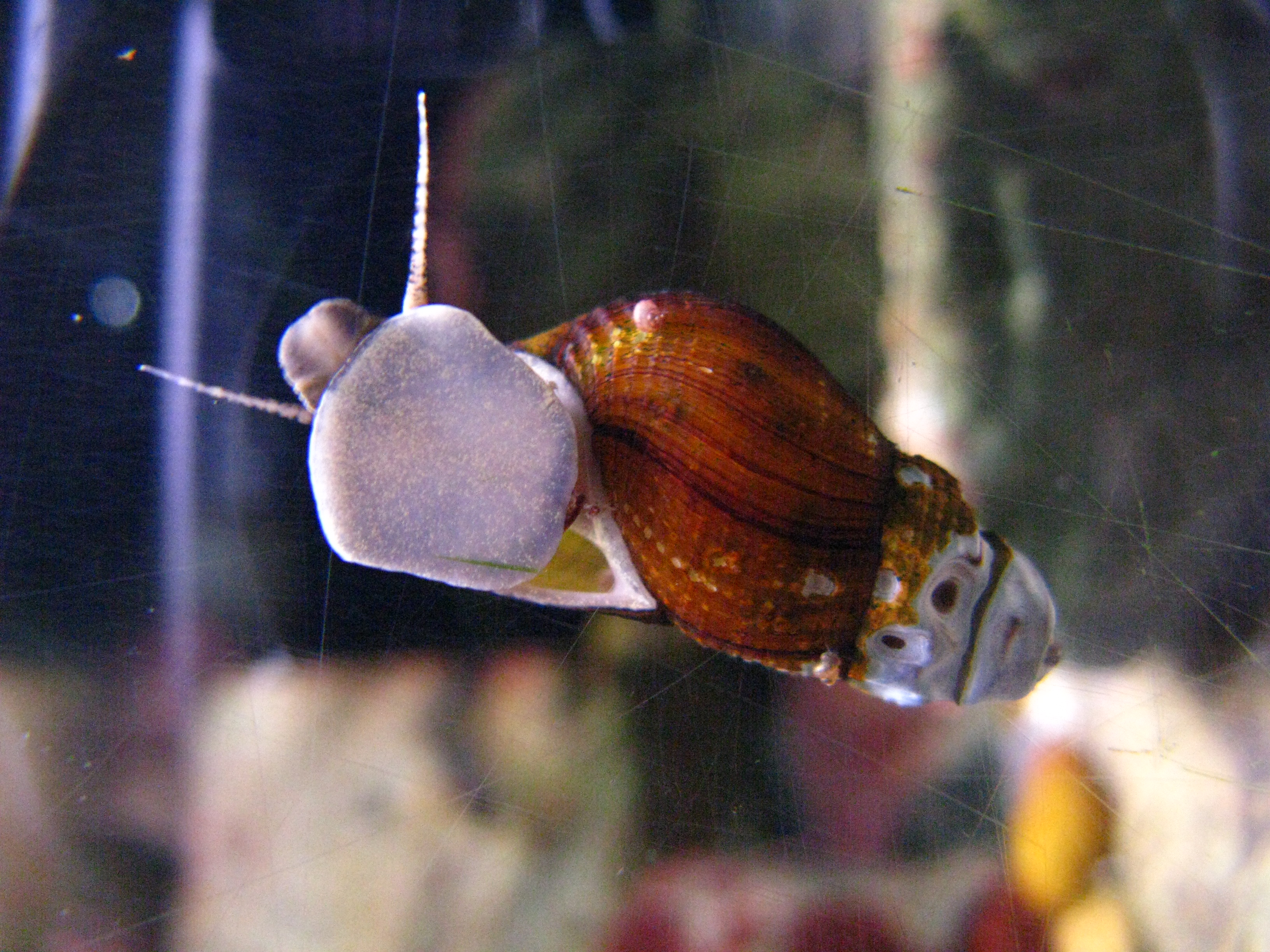
- A live individual of Semisulcospira kurodai crawling on the glass of an aquarium

Scientific classification
- Kingdom: Animalia
- Phylum: Mollusca
- Class: Gastropoda
- Subclass: Caenogastropoda
- Order: incertae sedis
- Superfamily: Cerithioidea
- Family: Semisulcospiridae; Morrison, 1952

Type species
- Hortia arriuensis Lozouet, 1999 †

Species
- See text

Diversity
- about 50 extant species

Synonyms
- Jugidae Starobogatov, Prozorova, Bogatov & Sayenko, 2004 (n.a.)

= Semisulcospiridae =

Family of gastropods

Semisulcospiridae, common name semisulcospirids, is a family of freshwater snails, aquatic gilled gastropod mollusks with an operculum, in the superfamily Cerithioidea.

Semisulcospiridae diversified from the Pleuroceridae about 90 million years ago, in the Cretaceous.

== Distribution ==
The family Semisulcospiridae occurs in western North America, the Far East of Russia, Korea, Japan, China and Vietnam.

== Taxonomy ==
The family Semisulcospiridae was introduced as just a name (nomen nudum) by Morrison (1952), without a diagnosis of the taxon. It is a valid taxon however, because its name has been used as valid.

=== 2005 taxonomy ===
According to the taxonomy of Bouchet & Rocroi (2005), Semisulcospiridae was a subfamily within the family Pleuroceridae.

=== 2009 taxonomy ===
The subfamily Semisulcospirinae within the Pleuroceridae was elevated to family level as Semisulcospiridae by Strong & Köhler (2009).

== Genera ==
There is very high level of mitochondrial heterogeneity in apparent species of Semisulcospiridae (highest among gastropods, also with Pleuroceridae), that has not been sufficiently explained yet as of 2015.

Genera within the family Semisulcospiridae include:

- Hua S.-F. Chen, 1943
- Juga H. Adams & A. Adams, 1854
- Koreoleptoxis J. B. Burch & Y. Jung, 1988
  - Koreoleptoxis globus
- Semisulcospira O. Boettger, 1886 - the type genus

Genera brought into synonymy

- Biwamelania Matsuoka, 1985: synonym of Semisulcospira O. Böttger, 1886
- Koreanomelania: synonym of Koreoleptoxis J. B. Burch & Y. Jung, 1988
- Namrutua Abbott, 1948: synonym of Semisulcospira O. Böttger, 1886 (junior synonym)
- "Parajuga": synonym of Juga H. Adams & A. Adams, 1854 (unavailable name: no type species designated)
- Senckenbergia Yen, 1939: synonym of Semisulcospira O. Böttger, 1886 (junior synonym)
