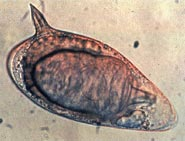
- Egg of Schistosoma mansoni

Scientific classification
- Kingdom: Animalia
- Phylum: Platyhelminthes
- Class: Trematoda
- Order: Diplostomida
- Superfamily: Schistosomatoidea
- Family: Schistosomatidae; Stiles & Hassall, 1898

= Schistosomatidae =

Family of flukes

Schistosomatidae is a family of digenetic trematodes with complex parasitic life cycles. Immature developmental stages of schistosomes are found in molluscs and adults occur in vertebrates. The best studied group, the blood flukes of the genus Schistosoma, infect and cause disease in humans. Other genera which are infective to non-human vertebrates can cause mild rashes in humans.

Schistosomatids are dioecious (individuals are of separate sexes) which is exceptional with regard to their phylum, Platyhelminthes, in which most species are hermaphroditic (individuals possess both male and female reproductive systems).

== History ==
The eggs of these parasites were first described by Theodor Bilharz, a German pathologist working in Egypt in 1851 who found the eggs during the course of an autopsy. He wrote two letters to his former teacher Karl Theodor Ernst von Siebold in May and August 1851 describing his findings. von Siebold wrote a paper (published in 1852) summarizing Bilharz's findings. Bilhart's wrote a paper in 1856 describing the worms more fully and he named them Distoma haematobium. Their unusual morphology meant that they could not be comfortably included in Distoma so in 1856 Meckel von Helmsback created the genus Bilharzia for them. In 1858 Weinland proposed the name Schistosoma (Greek: 'split body') after the male worms' morphology. Despite Bilharzia having precedence the genus name Schistosoma was officially adopted by the International Commission on Zoological Nomenclature.

In 1898 all the then known species were placed in a subfamily by Stiles and Hassel. This was then elevated to family status by Looss in 1899. Poche in 1907 corrected a grammatical error in the family name. The life cycle was determined by da Silva in 1908.

== Evolution ==
There are a number of different families of blood fluke including the Schistosomatidae. The others include the spirorchiids (turtle parasites) and the sanguinicolids (fish parasites).

The Schistosomatidae are considered venous system specialists and their sister group are vascular system generalists - the Spirorchiidae.

Schistosomatidae differ from other blood flukes in having separate sexes and homeothermic hosts. They have compensated for the reduction in potential reproductive partners by

- an increased overdispersion in the vertebrate host
- the reduced egg hatching time in the external environment
- the formation of permanent pairs mimicking the hermaphroditic condition
- the increased longevity in the definitive host
- increased fecundity.

Colonization of the venous system was made possible by

- the evolutionary radiation into terrestrial vertebrates
- the increased immunopathology associated with the high, constant body temperature of homeothermic vertebrates.

The arterial-dwelling spirorchiids release eggs in the direction of blood flow, resulting in a wide dissemination of eggs within the host. The lower body temperature of poikilotherms is accompanied by a seasonal nature of the immune response in these hosts resulting in a quantitatively reduced pathogenesis. Hosts that did succumb to the infection would most likely die in water where eggs could be released by predation, scavengers, or decomposition and develop successfully.

Colonization of the venous system by schistosomes required precise egg placement because their eggs are released against the blood flow. Eggs are then sequestered within the portal system (or perivesicular plexus in some species) of homeotherms which restricts egg dispersal but limits the resulting pathology to less sensitive organs. A significant number of eggs may escape into the external environment before a heavily infected host is incapacitated by, or dies from, the infection.

The first hosts of the schistosome were birds. Based on their current geographical spread the most likely place of origin of this family is Asia with subsequent spread to India and Africa.

Only one species is known to infect crocodiles - Griphobilharzia amoena. This species infects the freshwater crocodile Crocodylus johnstoni. Phylogenetic analysis shows that the genus Griphobilharzia rather than being a basal schistosome is a relation of the spirorchiids that infect freshwater turtles. It has also shown that the spirorchiids are the closest relations of the schistosoma.

An outline of the evolution of the schistosoma is now possible. The ancestral species infected freshwater turtles and the life cycle included gastropod hosts. Some of these species in their turn infected the marine turtles. At some point members of species infecting marine turtles developed the ability to infect birds – most likely waterfowl. This probably occurred somewhere in the Asian continent presumably at or near the coast. The bird species eventually developed the ability to infect mammals. This last development seems to have occurred in Gondwana between 120 million years ago and 70 million years ago.

== Taxonomy ==
The family was created in 1926 by Stiles and Hassel for the Schistosoma, the Sanguinicolidae and the Spirorchiidae. It has since been divided into four subfamilies: Schistosomatinae, Bilharziellinae, Denrobilharziinae and Gigantobilharziinae. In the Gigantobilharziinae the ventral sucker is absent and the female genital pore is medial near the anterior end of the body. In the Bilharziellinae the ventral pore in the female is always posterior to the ventral sucker. Both the Bilharziellinae and the Gigantobilharziinae are found exclusively in birds while the Schistosomatinae are found in both mammals and birds. In the Denrobilharziinae both suckers are absent and the caecum has numerous branches. In this latter family there is one genus (Denrdobilharina) with two species (Dendrobilharzina purvulenta and Dendrobilharzina asicaticus).

There are 12 genera in this family. Of these, seven infect birds: the others infect mammals including humans. There are about 100 known species in this family. The largest genus within the family Schistosomatidae is Trichobilharzia with over 40 species.

The genera are:

- Subfamily Bilharziellinae
  - Genus Bilharziella - birds (Setophaga pensylvanica, ducks)
- Subfamily Denrobilharziinae
  - Genus Dendritobilharzia - birds (ducks, swans)
- Subfamily Gigantobilharziinae
  - Gigantobilharzia - birds (Spinus tristis tristis)
- Subfamily Schistosomatinae
  - Allobilharzia - birds (Cygnus cygnus)
  - Austrobilharzia - birds (mainly waterfowl)
  - Bivitellobilharzia - mammals (elephants)
  - Heterobilharzia - mammals (raccoons)
  - Microbilharzia - birds (Larus canescens)
  - Ornithobilharzia - mammals (cattle, cats)
  - Schistomatium - mammals (rodents)
  - Schistosoma - mammals including humans
  - Trichobilharzia - birds (mainly waterfowl)

Orientobilharzia differ from Schistosoma only in the number of testes. The four species in this genus have recently (2012) been moved to the genus Schistosoma on the basis of morphology and molecular studies. The genus name should now be regarded as a junior synonym of Schistosoma.

The genera Bivitellobilharzia and Schistosoma form a clade in this family. Austrobilharzia and Ornithobilharzia are the closest relations of this clade.

Heterobilharzia and Schistomatium form a separate clade indicating that adaption to mammalian hosts has occurred at least twice. The species in these genera are found in North American mammals suggesting that transmission occurred via birds with subsequent transmission to mammals.

The genus Griphobilharzia which infects reptiles has been shown to be a member of the spirorchiid family whose other members infect freshwater turtles. Like the spirorchiids and unlike the schistomes Griphobilharzia preferentially inhabits the arterial system rather than the venous. This genus was originally grouped with the schistosoma on the basis of the existence of two sexes and other morphological features.

Notes

Sinobilharzia is a genus that is no longer considered valid.

== See also ==
- List of parasites (human)
