= Holostephanus cobitidis =

Scientific classification
- Domain: Eukaryota
- Kingdom: Animalia
- Phylum: Platyhelminthes
- Class: Trematoda
- Order: Diplostomida
- Family: Cyathocotylidae
- Genus: Holostephanus
- Species: H. cobitidis

Binomial name
- Holostephanus cobitidis Opravilova, 1968

Species of flatworm

Holostephanus cobitidis is a species of parasitic trematode in the family Cyathocotylidae.

== Hosts ==
=== Intermediate hosts ===
- Faucet snail (Bithynia tentaculata)
- Spined loach (Cobitis taenia)
- Round goby (Neogobius melanostomus)
- Monkey goby (Neogobius fluviatilis)
- Kessler's goby (Ponticola kessleri)
- Weatherfish (Misgurnus fossilis)
- Stone loach (Barbatula barbatula)
- Tubenose goby (Proterorhinus marmoratus)

=== Definitive hosts ===
- Mallard (Anas platyrhynchos)
- Hooded crow (Corvus cornix)
- Common kestrel (Falco tinnunculus)
- Black-headed gull (Larus ridibundus
