= Holostephanus dubinini =

Scientific classification
- Domain: Eukaryota
- Kingdom: Animalia
- Phylum: Platyhelminthes
- Class: Trematoda
- Order: Diplostomida
- Family: Cyathocotylidae
- Genus: Holostephanus
- Species: H. dubinini

Binomial name
- Holostephanus dubinini Vojtek & Vojtkova, 1968

Species of flatworm

Holostephanus dubinini is a species of parasitic trematode in the family Cyathocotylidae.

== Hosts ==
Holostephanus dubinini uses several fish and molluscs as intermediate hosts:

- Common bream (Abramis brama)
- Common bleak (Alburnus alburnus)
- Faucet snail (Bithynia tentaculata)
- Gudgeon (Gobio gobio)
- Guppy (Poecilia reticulata)
- Sunbleak (Leucaspius delineatus)
- Tench (Tinca tinca)
- Common roach (Rutilus rutilus)

It has only one definitive host, the great cormorant (Phalacrocorax carbo).
