= Holostephanus bursiformis =

Scientific classification
- Kingdom: Animalia
- Phylum: Platyhelminthes
- Class: Trematoda
- Order: Diplostomida
- Family: Cyathocotylidae
- Genus: Holostephanus
- Species: H. bursiformis

Binomial name
- Holostephanus bursiformis Szidat, 1936

Species of flatworm

Holostephanus bursiformis is a species of parasitic trematode in the family Cyathocotylidae.

== Hosts ==
Holostephanus bursiformis has been observed infecting the arctic tern (Sterna paradisaea).
