= Electrovermis =

Scientific classification
- Kingdom: Animalia
- Phylum: Platyhelminthes
- Class: Trematoda
- Order: Diplostomida
- Family: Aporocotylidae
- Genus: Electrovermis; Warren and Bullard, 2019
- Species: E. zappum

Binomial name
- Electrovermis zappum Warren and Bullard, 2019

Species of platyhelminth

Electrovermis zappum is a species of fish blood fluke discovered in the Gulf of Mexico and described in 2019. It has been placed in a new genus, Electrovermis. This parasite infects the lesser electric ray (Narcine bancroftii). Once it successfully invades the host, it migrates to and dwells in the lumen of the heart of the ray. Like other blood flukes, it thrives by feeding off of the blood of its host. The adults are morphologically and physiologically similar to other blood flukes that infect rays such as Orchispirium heterovitellatum. Unlike many other blood flukes that infect molluscs as an intermediate host, E. zappum infects bivalves such as clams. Both the rays and clams densely populate warm, shallow intertidal marine waters, which provide the parasite an opportunistic environment to carry out its life cycle stages.

== Life cycle ==
The general life cycle of the blood fluke, Electrovermis zappum, consists of a mollusc or polychaete intermediate host, and a fish definitive host. The life cycle of the Electrovermis zappum begins with the eggs being laid into the lesser electric ray, and then migrate out as miracidia, and infects the coquina clam intermediate host. This is where the blood fluke then undergoes asexual reproduction. The miracidia then turn into sporocysts, and within the sporocysts contain cercariae, which are then released into the water. When it penetrates the electric ray it then loses it tail and becomes a schistosomulum, similar to the life cycle of other schistosomes. Since both the lesser electric ray and where the cercariae are released is near the swash zone of the beach it can easily transmit and infect the ray. It then infects the heart lumen of the lesser electric ray at any age, and continues the life cycle.

== Anatomy ==
The general anatomical structure of the species was discovered. The body was found to be extremely elongate, dorsoventrally flattened and has anterior end tapering. The posterior end is bluntly rounded and lacking lateral tubercles. The nervous system is indistinct. The anterior suckle is aspinous and is lacking the peduncle and is unusually small. The pharynx of this parasite is absent in its structure. The intestine also has a U shape in the anatomical structure. Posterior oesophageal swelling is also present. The cirrus is long and is 65% of seminal vesicle length.

The testis is seen to be single, medial, looped, lacking lobed marginal and is found posterior to the intestine. The post ovary space comprises 1/3rd the body length. The uterus post-gonadal is found dorsal to posterior-most end of the seminal vehicle. The uterine eggs are found to be very large and occupy 67% of the uterus. The eggs are oblong and vacuous.
