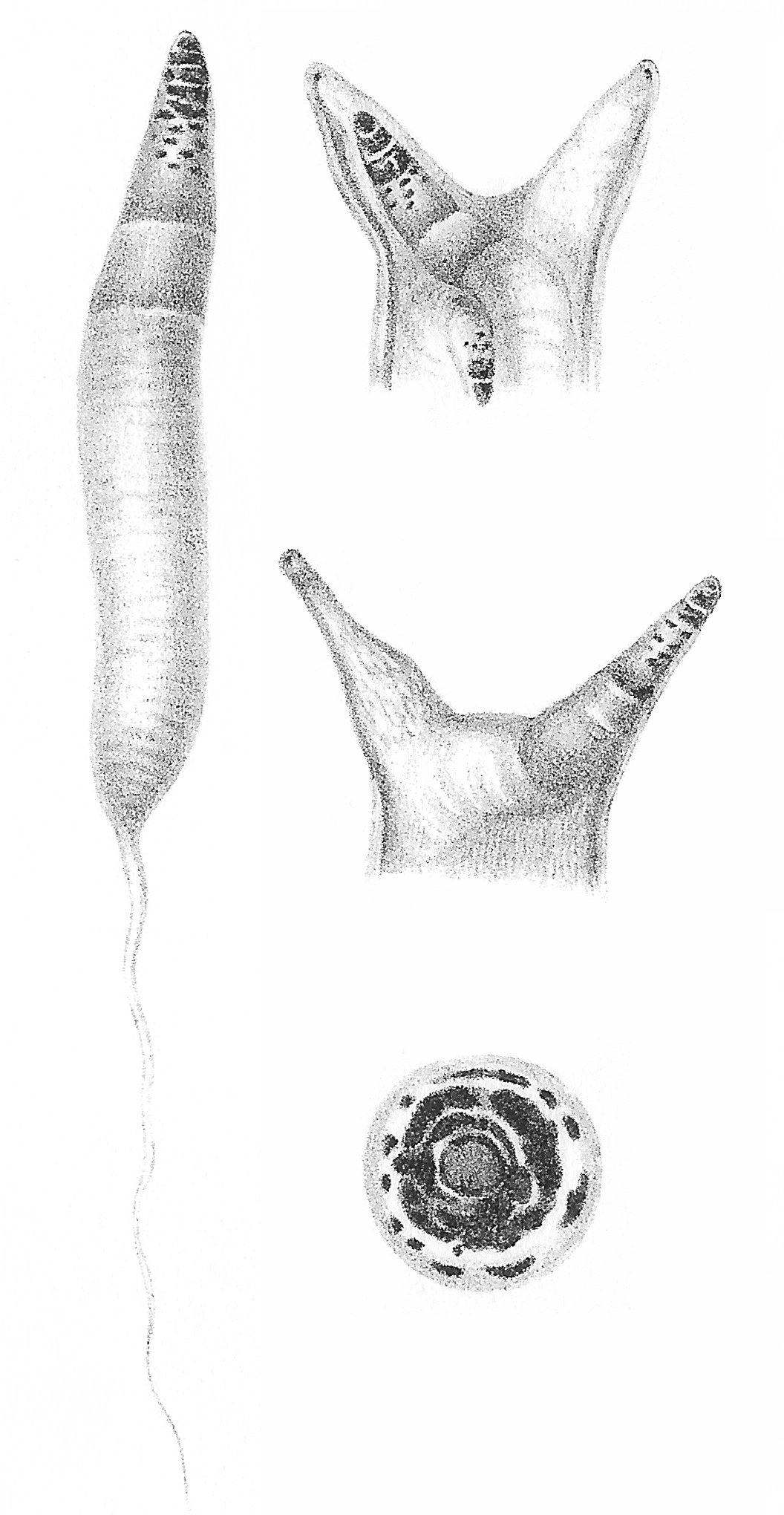
- Leucochloridium paradoxum, parasite in Succinea putris

Scientific classification
- Kingdom: Animalia
- Phylum: Platyhelminthes
- Class: Trematoda
- Order: Diplostomida
- Family: Leucochloridiidae
- Genus: Leucochloridium
- Species: L. paradoxum

Binomial name
- Leucochloridium paradoxum (Carus, 1835)

= Leucochloridium paradoxum =

Parasitic flatworm

Leucochloridium paradoxum, the green-banded broodsac, is a parasitic flatworm (or helminth). Its intermediate hosts are land snails, usually Succinea putris. The pulsating, green broodsacs fill the eye stalks of the snail, thereby attracting predation by birds, the primary host. These broodsacs visually imitate caterpillars, a prey of birds. The adult parasite lives in the bird's cloaca, releasing its eggs into the faeces.

== Life cycle ==
The species in Leucochloridium share a similar life cycle. They are parasites of snails and birds. This is a truncated life cycle compared with typical trematodes, because the snail acts as both the first and second intermediate host.

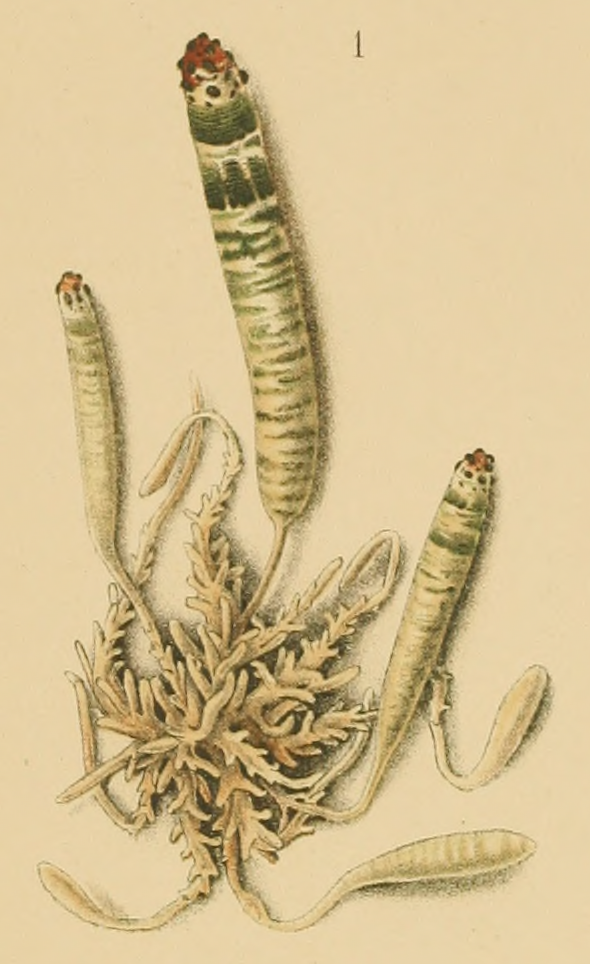
Sporocyst. The stalk of the largest broodsac is drawn shortened. A metacercaria is passing along the lowest stalk.

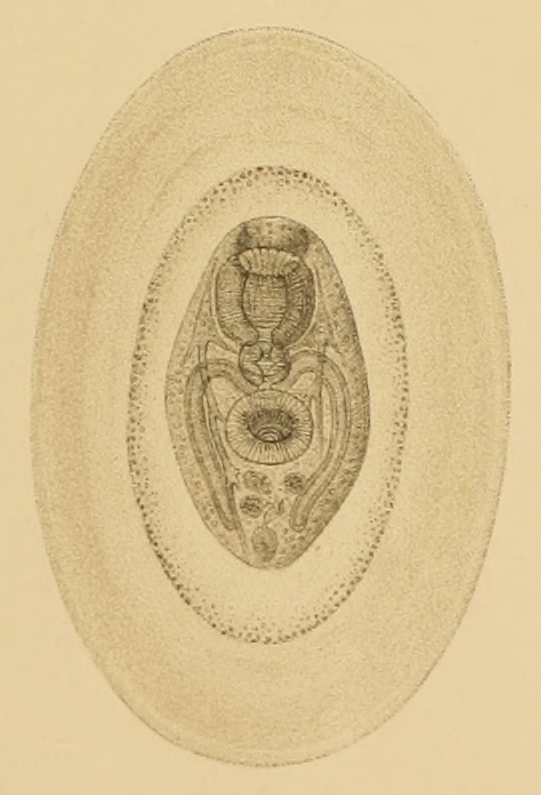
Mature metacercaria ready to be transferred to the bird host; note the thick coat.

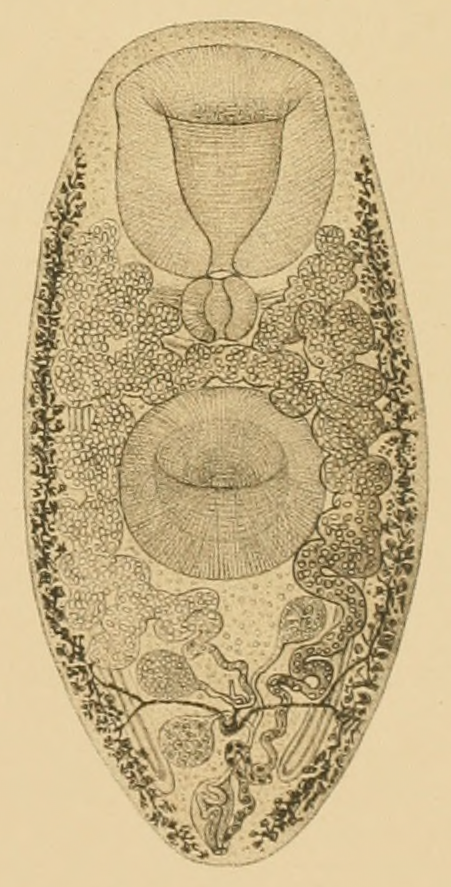
Adult found in the cloaca of the host bird; note the two prominent suckers.

Eggs ingested by the snail hatch into miracidia in the stomach or midgut. The miracidia are 23 μm long, ellipitical in shape, and have only about 10 cells. Cilia, partly forming cirri, make this stage motile, and at the front end is a stylet thought to help penetrate the intestinal wall. Once a miracidium reaches the snail's hepatopancreas, it disintegrates to release a germinal cell. This develops there into the next stage, a sporocyst.

The mature sporocyst consists of a number of branches spreading through the haemocoel and may make up a fifth or more of the snail's weight. Some of the branches develop into long tubes ending in a swollen broodsac, but these are staggered in their states of development, so that normally only two or three broodsacs are mature simultaneously. The basal part of the sporocyst produces asexually many tail-less cercariae, which develop directly into metacercariae within the sporocyst, depositing a thick mucoid coat around themselves. The mature metacercariae are oval in shape, 1.2 × 0.8 mm. Typically 100–250 such metacercariae accumulate in a broodsac.

One or both of the snail's tentacles become occupied by a mature broodsac, which transforms the appearance of the snail. The tentacle is swollen and the pulsating, colourful, banded broodsac visible inside mimics the appearance of an insect larva like a caterpillar. This encourages their consumption by the next host, insectivorous birds. Observations in captivity indicated that birds tore the broodsac out of the snail before eating it, so the snail may survive this. Birds may also become infected by eating broodsacs that have spontaneously burst from the tentacle, surviving for an hour whilst they continue to pulsate.

If the broodsac is eaten by a bird, the metacercariae pass along its alimentary tract, and lodge in the gut. They have been found in the large intestine, cloaca and bursa of Fabricius. Having lost the mucoid coat, they develop into adult distomes, c. 1.5 mm long. This form has two suckers on the ventral side, which anchor it to the gut wall, and a smooth dorsal surface. The adults are hermaphroditic and release eggs into the bird's faeces. In an experimental system, eggs first appeared in the faeces 13 days after infection. Some eggs will be eaten by a snail, thus completing the life cycle.

In a study in Russia, snails became infected in spring and summer. The resultant sporocysts were producing infective metacercariae in the following spring but then died in late summer. The lifetime of the adult stage in its bird host is believed to be of the order of weeks or months.

== Behaviour of the broodsacs and infected snails ==
Sporocyst of congener Leucochloridium variae within a snail. (video clip, 1m 30s)

The pulsations of the broodsacs typically vary from 40 to 75 times a minute depending on temperature, but they cease in the dark.

The parasite manipulates the snail host's behaviour in a way likely to make it more conspicuous to birds. In one study of Succinea putris hosts, infected snails stayed in better-lit places for longer, sat on higher vegetation, and were more mobile. Whereas 53% of infected snails remained fully exposed for the 45 minutes of the observation period, the figure was only 28% for the controls (nearby snails without Leucochloridium broodsacs). Infected snails may survive for at least a year and continue to be able to use the eyes on the ends of their tentacles. Although snails infected by other Leucochloridium species are reported to continue to reproduce, snails infected by L. paradoxum often show a reduction of the sexual organs.

The appearance and behaviour of the sporocysts is a case of aggressive mimicry, where the parasite vaguely resembles the food of the host, thereby gaining the parasite entry into the host's body by being eaten. This is unlike most other cases of aggressive mimicry, in which the mimic eats the duped animal.

== Taxonomy ==
In older literature, L. paradoxum may be referred to as Leucochloridium macrostomum, derived from Rudolphi's 1803 description of Fasciola macrostoma, which he later (1809) renamed Distomum macrostomum. The confusion came about because Zeller in 1874 misidentified adults of L. paradoxum as D. macrostomum. Rudolphi's species is now in the genus Urogonimus. Leucochloridium heckerti Kagan, 1951 is also considered a synonym of L. paradoxum.

Based on genetic sequences and comparisons of the broodsac colouration, it has been suggested that the population of L. paradoxum reported from Japan deserves to be considered a separate species.

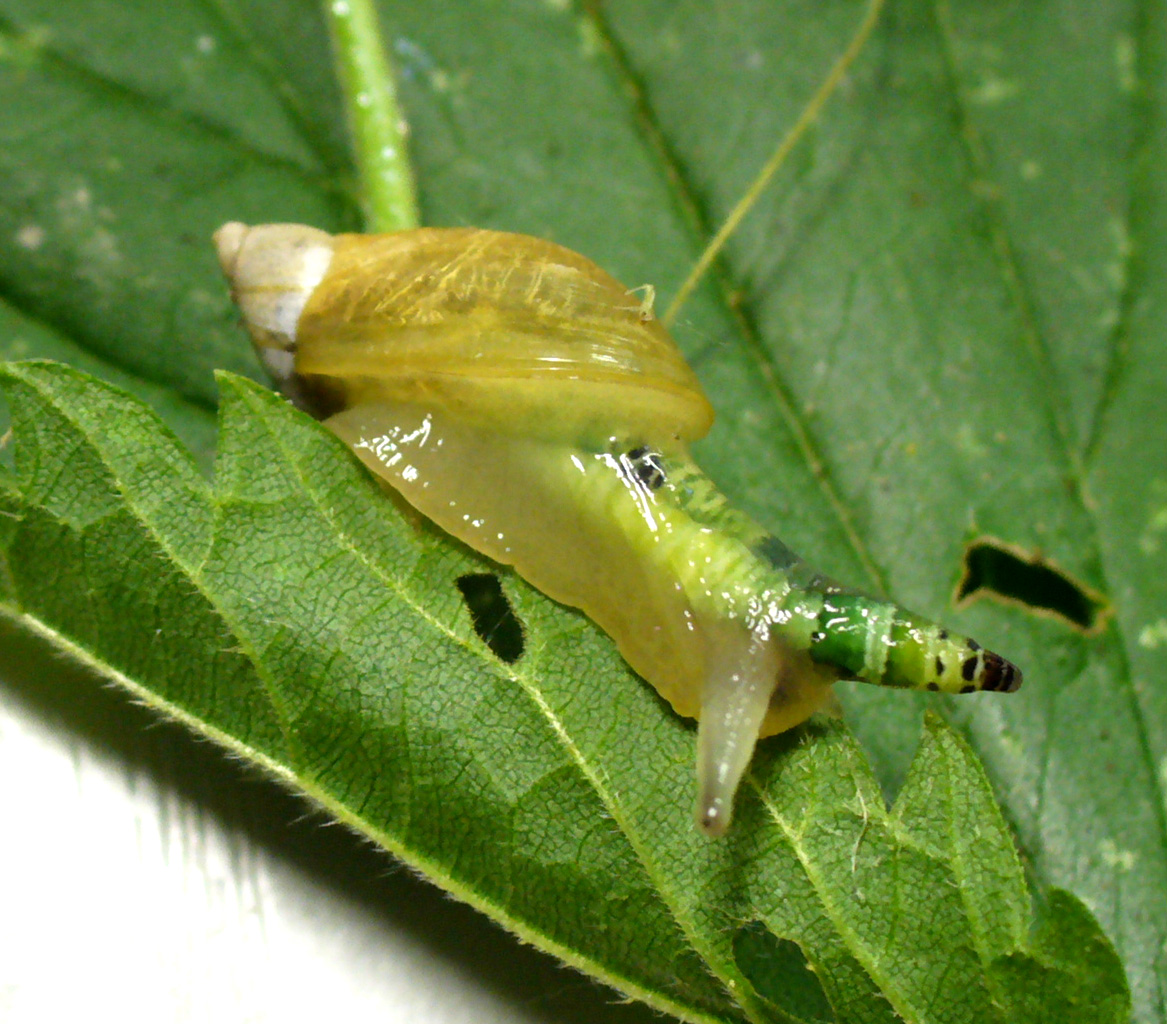
The snail Succinea putris with broodsac inside its left tentacle

== Identification ==
The easiest way to differentiate between Leucochloridium species is from the appearance of the broodsacs in the tentacle of the host snail. Leucochloridium paradoxum exhibits broodsacs that have green bands with dark brown and black spots, and with a dark-brown or reddish-brown tip. As the broodsacs mature the colours become brighter and the tips browner. Nowadays this method of identification may be supported with DNA barcoding sequences. A snail may be simultaneously infected by more than one species of Leucochloridium.

The adults—small and found in the cloaca of birds—are less well known, so that distinguishing the species is less straightforward. Useful distinguishing characters of L. paradoxum are its round-shaped body, an oral sucker slightly larger than the ventral sucker, and the position of the gonads close to ventral sucker; but it is not consistently distinguishable morphologically from L. perturbatum.

== Habitat ==
Leucochloridium paradoxum is found in moist areas, such as marshes, where the usual intermediate host Succinea snails are found.

== Distribution ==
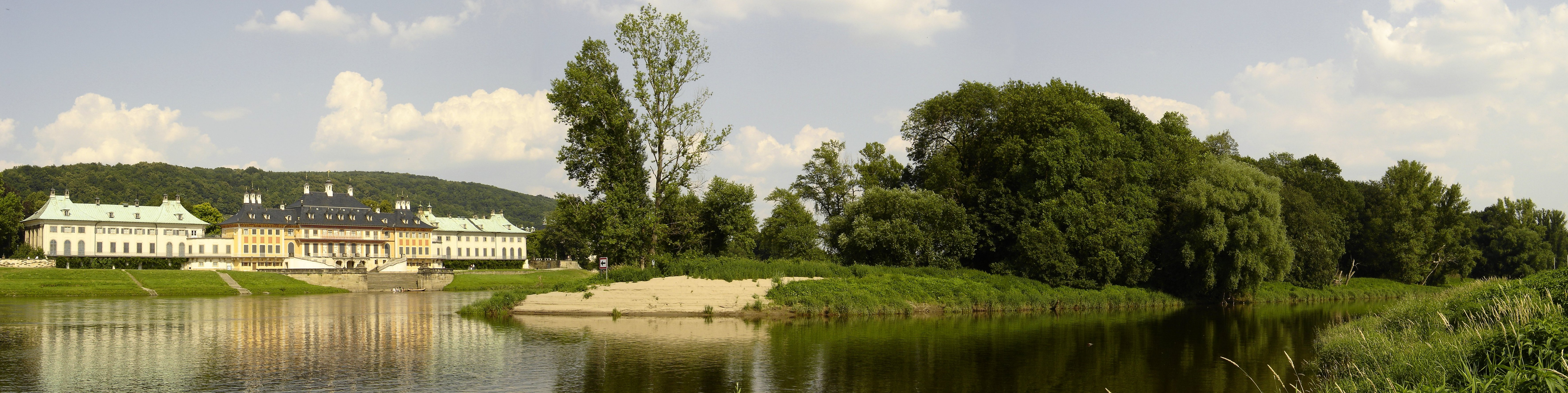
Type locality: island in the Elbe at Pillnitz

Leucochloridium paradoxum was originally described based on its sporocyst stage, collected from an island in the river Elbe at Pillnitz, near Dresden, Germany. Other known locations are Poland, the Czech Republic, Belarus, Belgium, the Saint Petersburg area of Russia, Denmark, Sweden, Norway, the Netherlands, and the United Kingdom. It has also been recorded from Japan, but this may be a separate species. It has been suggested that L. paradoxum is the species infecting an endemic species of semi-slug on Robinson Crusoe Island in the Pacific, but this seems doubtful given the host specificity of L. paradoxum and that this would be the only occurrence in the Southern Hemisphere.

== Hosts ==
Intermediate hosts:

- Succinea putris
- Succinea lauta (in Japan; identity of Leucochloridium species questioned)
- Omalonyx gayana (Robinson Crusoe Island; identity of Leucochloridium species questioned)

Primary hosts:

- Dozens of species of birds, mostly passerines but also the greater spotted woodpecker. In a study in the Czech Republic it was particularly prevalent in the great tit and marsh tit.
- Zebra finch (Taeniopygia guttata) – experimental
- Chicken (Gallus gallus) – experimental
