= Griphobilharzia =

Scientific classification
- Kingdom: Animalia
- Phylum: Platyhelminthes
- Class: Trematoda
- Order: Diplostomida
- Family: Schistosomatidae
- Subfamily: Griphobilharziinae; Platt, Blair, Purdie & Melville, 1991
- Genus: Griphobilharzia; Platt, Blair, Purdie & Melville, 1991
- Species: G. amoena

Binomial name
- Griphobilharzia amoena Platt, Blair, Purdie & Melville, 1991

Genus of flukes

Griphobilharzia amoena is a significant trematode that infect crocodiles such as the Australian freshwater crocodile, Crocodylus johnstoni, located in Darwin, Australia with reported illness in Irian Jaya as well. They possess a distinctive tegument that is composed of two lipid bilayers instead of a single bilayer. The double bilayer may be an adaptation to survive the host's immune response. Griphobilharzia amoena is the only species in the genus Griphobilharzia.

== Description ==
The life cycle remains unknown but cercariae probably develop in mollusks, most likely gastropods. Its intermediate host could be freshwater snails from family Planorbidae.

Griphobilharzia amoena are dioecious and are found in the circulatory system of their definitive host, Crocodylus johnstoni. The male has a gynecophoric chamber that extends two-thirds of the acetabulum to testis. Females are oriented anti-parallel to the males and are completely enclosed in the gynecophoric chamber. The nature of the physical relationship between the sexes is unclear. The worms are hematophagous, even the female, despite being fully enclosed.

== Evolution ==
The notion that Griphobilharzia amoena is the only schistosome found in a cold-blooded animal (crocodile), leads to the hypothesis that perhaps Griphobilharzia amoena and other schistosomes are based in ectothermic archosaurs. It was also predicted that since Griphobilharzia amoena originated in ectotherms and then inhabited endothermic avian species, which is where they exist today. Brant and Loker used endothermy as a key factor in the diversification of schistosomes. However, upon analysis it was discovered that Griphobilharzia amoena is actually more closely related to spirorchiids from freshwater turtles rather than to schistosomes.
