= Heterobilharzia =

Scientific classification
- Kingdom: Animalia
- Phylum: Platyhelminthes
- Class: Trematoda
- Order: Diplostomida
- Family: Schistosomatidae
- Genus: Heterobilharzia; Price, 1929

Genus of trematodes

Heterobilharzia is a genus of trematodes in the family Schistosomatidae. The species Heterobilharzia Americana is a parasite of the Southeastern United States and typically found in raccoons. Species of this genus are responsible for Schistosoma in canines. Cercariae found in freshwater may also cause Swimmer's itch in humans.

== Cycle ==
=== Intermediate host ===
Eggs are released in the feces of an infected host (raccoons and other mammals) and enter freshwaters such as streams, rivers, and lakes. Miracidium hatch from the egg and begin to actively search for a suitable intermediate host. Typical intermediate hosts include mollusks and freshwater snails. Miracidium penetrates the intermediate host and develops into mother sporocysts. The sporocysts multiply via asexual reproduction to produce daughter sporocysts, which enter the digestive system of the intermediate host and evolve into cercariae. The cercariae are excreted from the snail and become free-living organisms in bodies of freshwater.

=== Definitive host ===
Cercariae actively search for their definitive host and enter by penetrating the skin of the mammal. Once in the bloodstream, the cercariae begin to transform into adults. The young adults circulate in the blood and pass through the lungs until residing in the liver and reaching full maturity. Mature adults may release eggs that migrate to the lumen of the intestines and are excreted in the feces. This starts the life cycle for the next generation.

== Species ==
- Heterobilharzia americana Prince 1929 (Price, Emmett W. 1929. A synopsis of the trematode family Schistosomidae with descriptions of new genera and species. Proceedings of the United States National Museum 75(18): 1-39.)
- Heterobilharzia nutria

== Related species ==
Related species include mammalian schistosomes of freshwater within the United States.
