= Baracktrema =

Scientific classification
- Kingdom: Animalia
- Phylum: Platyhelminthes
- Class: Trematoda
- Order: Diplostomida
- Family: Spirorchiidae
- Genus: Baracktrema; Roberts et al., 2016
- Species: B. obamai

Binomial name
- Baracktrema obamai Roberts et al., 2016

Species of fluke

Baracktrema obamai is a species of blood fluke, found in Malaysian freshwater turtles. The discovery prompted the creation of a new genus, Baracktrema. It was discovered in 2015 by a team of American parasitologists led by Thomas R. Platt, and named after U.S. President Barack Obama.

Baracktrema obamai is likely an ancestor of the parasitic flatworms that cause schistosomiasis. It infects the lungs of host turtles, but is not currently known to infect humans. B. obamai is classified as a parasitic flatworm.

Baracktrema obamai has been seen to infect two kinds of turtles, the black marsh turtle (Siebenrockiella crassicollis) and the Amboina box turtle (Cuora amboinensis). Both turtles are found in Malaysia.

== Morphology ==
Baracktrema has a thread-like, cylindrical, body by being 30 to 50 times longer than it is wide. Monoecious body type was detailed in the study, but generally, blood flukes have both monoecious and diecious stages. This genus, along with Unicaecum, are the only genera to have a combination of:

- a single cecum
- a single testis
- oviducal seminal receptacle
- uterine pouch
- post-cecal terminal genitalia
- lacks tegument spines

Baracktrema was designated its own genus due to

- anterior pharynx
- a highly convoluted cecum throughout the length of the cecum
- a spindle-shaped ovary that lies between the testis and the cirrus sac
- a uterine pouch that loops around the primary Vitelline collecting duct

== Life cycle ==
Should resemble that of other turtle blood flukes. It is believed that the eggs of Baracktrema could be taken by the circulatory system to the alveoli, as seen in schistosomes. Baracktrema is believed to, alternatively or in addition to using the circulatory system, directly lay eggs in the lumen of the alveoli. With either mechanism, travel from the alveoli to the external environment is unknown, but suspected to be due to the combination of coughing and the bronchial escalator. It seems that eggs are released from the turtle and it is suspected, through laboratory observation, that upon contact with freshwater, the miracidium is released from the egg.

== See also ==
- List of things named after Barack Obama
- List of organisms named after famous people (born 1950–1974)
