= Hapalotrema =

Scientific classification
- Kingdom: Animalia
- Phylum: Platyhelminthes
- Class: Trematoda
- Order: Diplostomida
- Family: Spirorchiidae
- Genus: Hapalotrema; Looss, 1899

Genus of worms

Hapalotrema is a genus of trematodes belonging to the family Spirorchiidae.

The genus has cosmopolitan distribution.

Species:

- Hapalotrema dorsopora Dailey, Fast & Balazs, 1993
- Hapalotrema loossii Price, 1934
- Hapalotrema mehrai Rao, 1976
- Hapalotrema mistroides (Monticelli, 1896)
- Hapalotrema orientalis Takeuti, 1942
- Hapalotrema pambanense Mehrotra, 1973
- Hapalotrema postorchis Rao, 1976
- Hapalotrema synorchis Luhman, 1935
