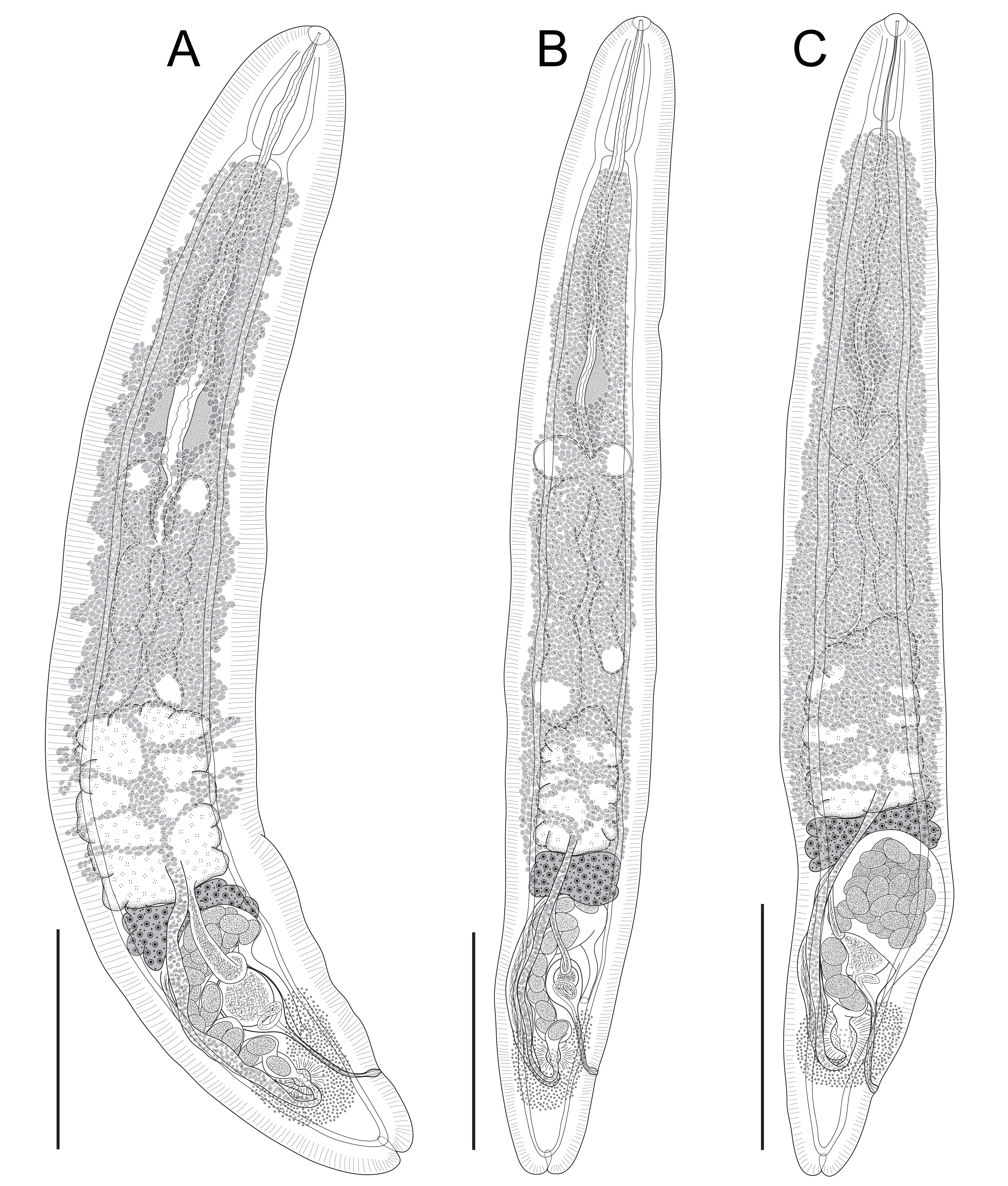
- Three species of Holocentricola

Scientific classification
- Kingdom: Animalia
- Phylum: Platyhelminthes
- Class: Trematoda
- Order: Diplostomida
- Family: Aporocotylidae
- Genus: Holocentricola; Cutmore & Cribb, 2021

= Holocentricola =

Genus of flukes

Holocentricola is a genus of digeneans in the family Aporocotylidae or blood flukes, described in 2021. The name of the genus refers to the host fish, which are members of the family Holocentridae or squirrelfishes.

The genus includes three species

- Holocentricola rufus Cutmore & Cribb, 2021 from Sargocentron rubrum (Forsskål), from off Heron Island, southern Great Barrier Reef, and Lizard Island, northern Great Barrier Reef, Australia.
- Holocentricola exilis Cutmore & Cribb, 2021 from Neoniphon sammara (Forsskål) from off Lizard Island
- Holocentricola coronatus Cutmore & Cribb, 2021 from Sargocentron diadema (Lacepède) off Lizard Island.
