= Strigeoidea =

Scientific classification
- Domain: Eukaryota
- Kingdom: Animalia
- Phylum: Platyhelminthes
- Class: Trematoda
- Order: Strigeidida
- Suborder: Strigeata
- Superfamily: Strigeoidea

Superfamily of flukes

The Strigeoidea are a superfamily of flatworms, belonging to the large group Digenea. Many species are endoparasites.
