= Holostephanus =

Scientific classification
- Kingdom: Animalia
- Phylum: Platyhelminthes
- Class: Trematoda
- Order: Diplostomida
- Family: Cyathocotylidae
- Genus: Holostephanus; Szidat, 1936

Type species
- Holostephanus luehei Szidat, 1936

Species
- see text

Synonyms
- Cyathocotyloides Szidat, 1936

Genus of flukes

Holostephanus is a genus of parasitic trematodes in the family Cyathocotylidae.

== Species ==
Holostephanus contains the following species, according to the World Register of Marine Species:

- Holostephanus bursiformis Szidat, 1936
- Holostephanus cobitidis Opravilova, 1968
- Holostephanus dubinini Vojtek & Vojtkova, 1968
- Holostephanus lari Sudarikov, 1971
- Holostephanus luehei Szidat, 1936
- Holostephanus metorchis Yamaguti, 1939
- Holostephanus nipponicus Yamaguti, 1939
- Holostephanus sindhensis Das, Saeed, Khan & Ghazi, 2020
