= Kritsky =

Scientific classification
- Kingdom: Animalia
- Phylum: Platyhelminthes
- Class: Trematoda
- Order: Diplostomida
- Family: Aporocotylidae
- Genus: Kritsky; Orelis-Ribeiro & Bullard, 2016
- Species: K. platyrhynchi

Binomial name
- Kritsky platyrhynchi (Guidelli, Isaac & Pavanelli, 2002) Orelis-Ribeiro & Bullard, 2016

Genus of flukes

Kritsky is a genus of digeneans in the family Aporocotylidae or blood flukes. The name of the genus honours the American parasitologist Delane C. Kritsky.

The genus includes the single species Kritsky platyrhynchi (Guidelli, Isaac & Pavanelli, 2002) Orelis-Ribeiro & Bullard, 2016, which is a parasite of the body cavity of the porthole shovelnose catfish, Hemisorubim platyrhynchos (Pimelodidae) in Peru.
