= Spirhapalum =

Scientific classification
- Kingdom: Animalia
- Phylum: Platyhelminthes
- Class: Trematoda
- Order: Diplostomida
- Family: Spirorchiidae
- Genus: Spirhapalum; Ejsmont, 1927

Genus of flatworms

Spirhapalum is a genus of flatworms belonging to the family Spirorchiidae.

Species:

- Spirhapalum elongatum Rohde, Lee & Lim, 1968
- Spirhapalum polesianum Ejsmont, 1927
- Spirhapalum siamense Tkach, Snyder & Vaughan, 2009
