= Succinea putris =

Conservation status
- Secure (NatureServe)

Scientific classification
- Kingdom: Animalia
- Phylum: Mollusca
- Class: Gastropoda
- Order: Stylommatophora
- Family: Succineidae
- Genus: Succinea
- Species: S. putris

Binomial name
- Succinea putris Linnaeus, 1758

Species of gastropod

Succinea putris is a species of small air-breathing land snail in the family Succineidae, the amber snails.

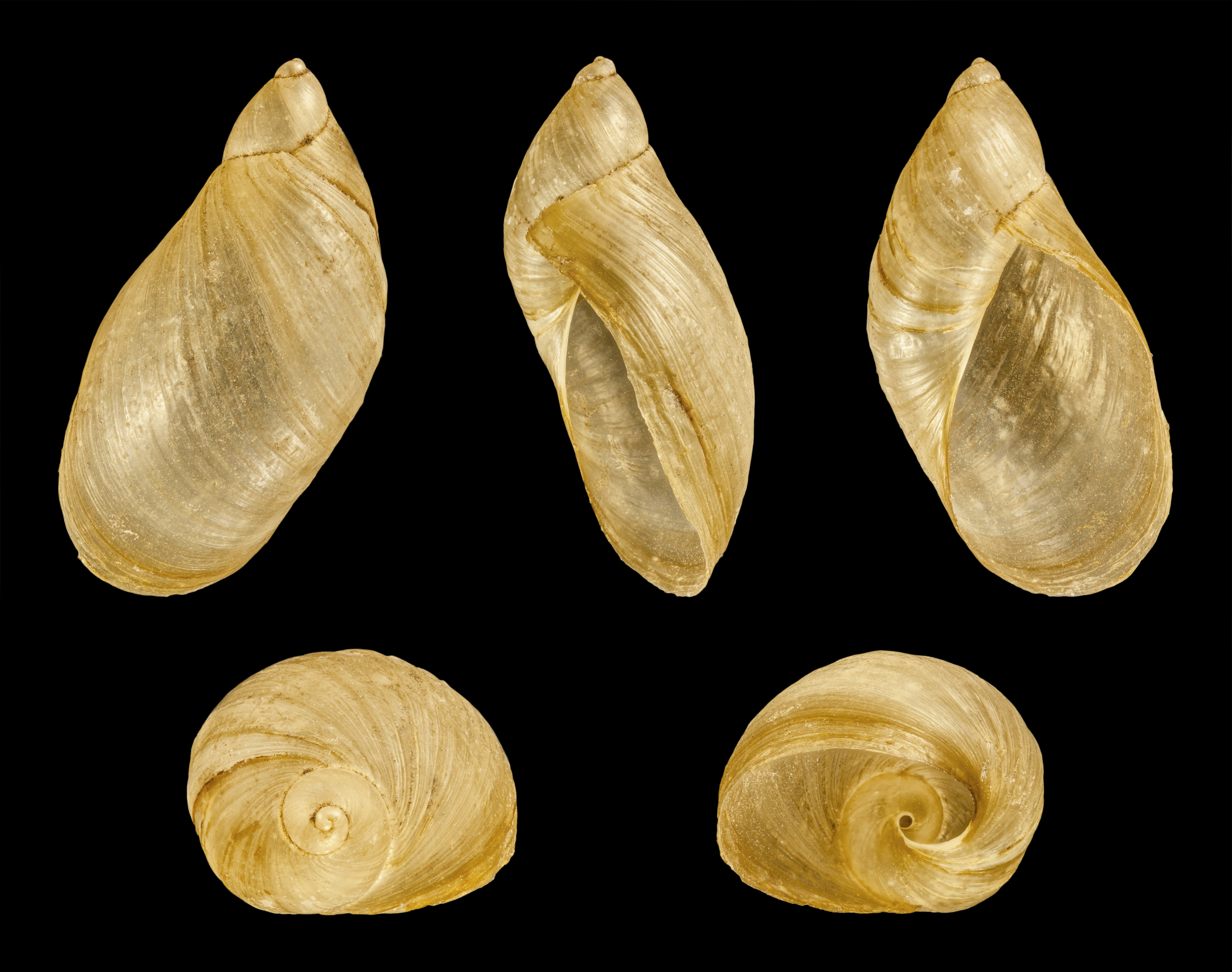

== Description ==
The 10-17 (27) x 6-8 mm shell has 3-4 whorls. These are relatively flat and with shallow sutures. The body whorl is massive and the aperture is much greater than 50% of shell height. The spire is small. In color the shell is amber yellow. The visible soft parts are yellow with a reddish hue, which becomes lighter downwards to the sides. The animal can also be dark grey.

== Distribution ==
The distribution of this species is Palearctic, in the Euro-Siberian region, including the following countries:

- Belgium
- Czech Republic
- Finland
- Germany
- Netherlands
- Poland
- Ukraine
- Russia
- Canada
- Slovakia
- Bulgaria
- Great Britain
- Ireland
- Estonia

== Habitat ==
This species lives in very damp places, such as on vegetation on river banks and marshes.

== Life cycle ==
The lifespan of Succinea putris in laboratory conditions is 13 to 17 months.

== Parasites ==
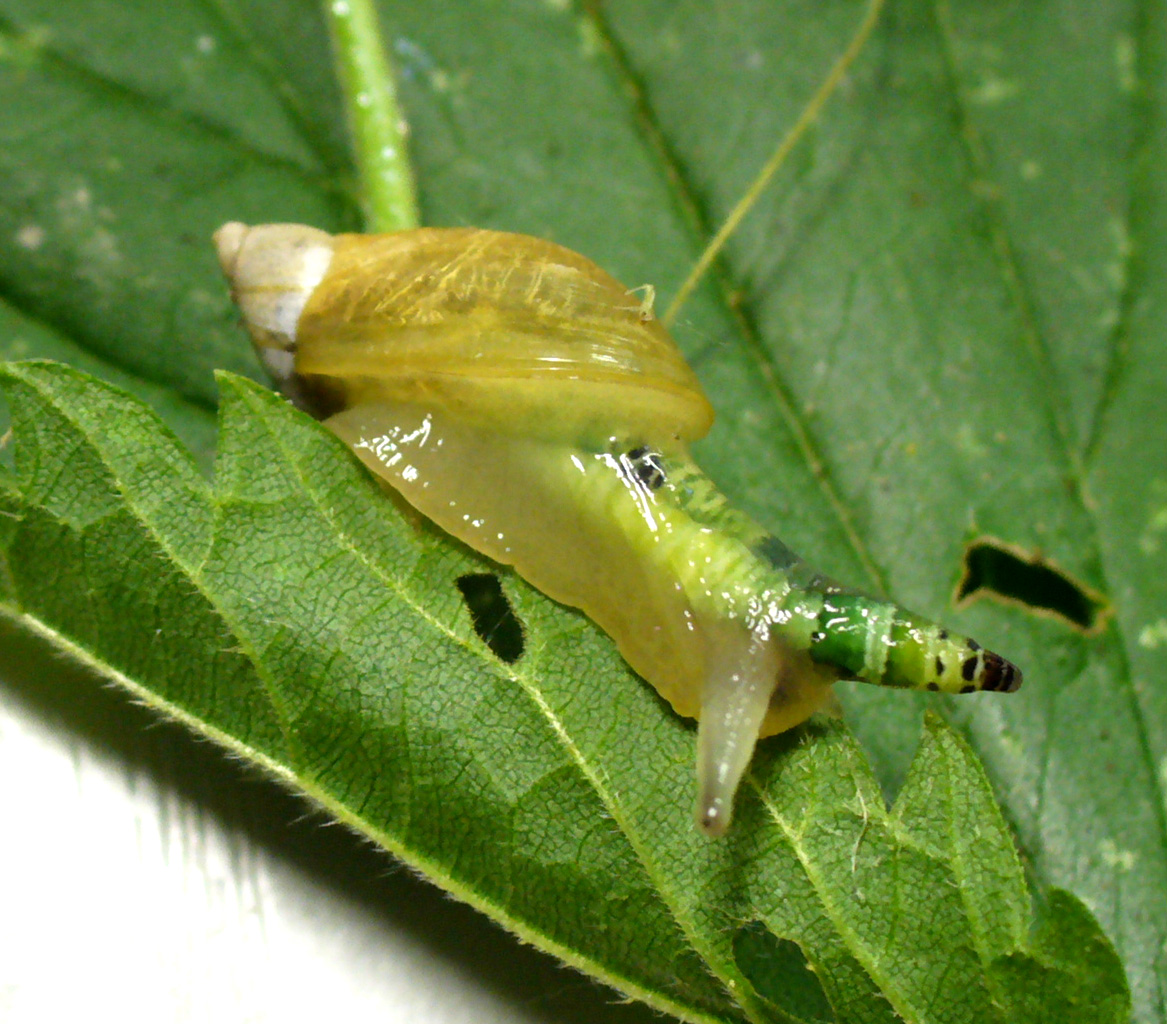
Succinea putris with the parasitic trematode Leucochloridium paradoxum inside its left tentacle

Parasites and parasitoids of this species include the trematodes Leucochloridium paradoxum and L. perturbatum, and the fly Pherbellia punctata.
