= Bolbocephalodidae =

Scientific classification
- Kingdom: Animalia
- Phylum: Platyhelminthes
- Class: Trematoda
- Order: Diplostomida
- Superfamily: Diplostomoidea
- Family: Bolbocephalodidae

Family of flatworms

Bolbocephalodidae is a family of flatworms belonging to the order Diplostomida. The family consists of only one genus: Bolbocephalodes Strand, 1935.
