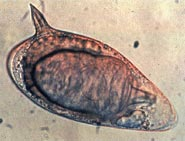
- Egg of Schistosoma mansoni

Scientific classification
- Kingdom: Animalia
- Phylum: Platyhelminthes
- Class: Trematoda
- Order: Diplostomida
- Suborder: Diplostomata
- Superfamily: Schistosomatoidea; Stiles & Hassall, 1898

= Schistosomatoidea =

Superfamily of flukes

The Schistosomatoidea are a superfamily of digenetic trematodes.

== Families ==
- Aporocotylidae Odhner, 1912
- Schistosomatidae Stiles & Hassall, 1898
- Spirorchiidae Stunkard, 1921
