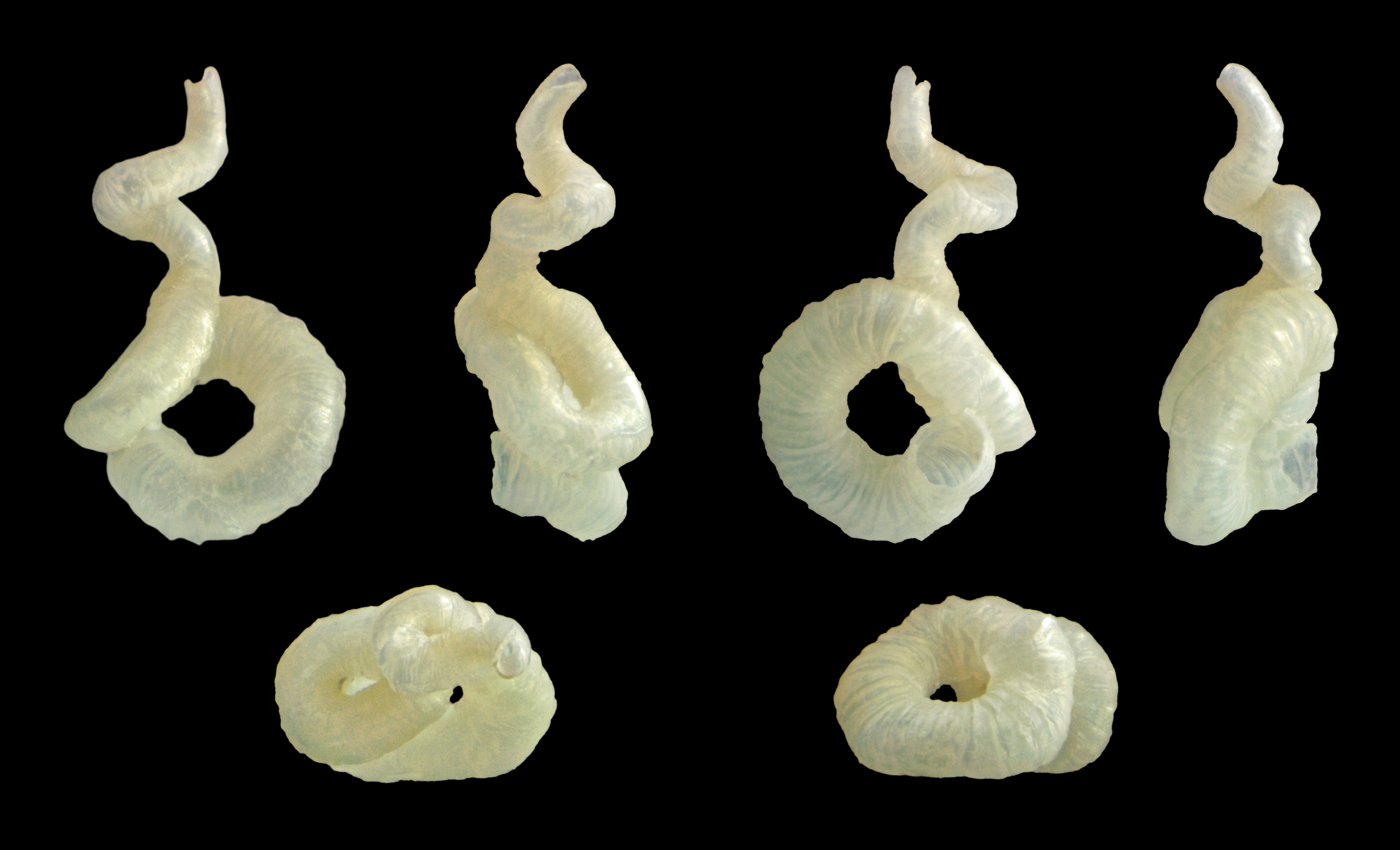

Scientific classification
- Kingdom: Animalia
- Phylum: Mollusca
- Class: Gastropoda
- Subclass: Caenogastropoda
- Order: Littorinimorpha
- Family: Vermetidae
- Genus: Thylaeodus
- Species: T. rugulosus

Binomial name
- Thylaeodus rugulosus Monterosato, 1878

Synonyms
- Spiroglyphus rugulosus (Monterosato, 1878); Spiroglyphus rugulosu haifensis s Nordsieck, 1972; Vermetus rugulosus Monterosato, 1878 (original combination)

= Thylaeodus rugulosus =

Species of gastropod

Thylaeodus rugulosus is a species of sea snail, a marine gastropod mollusk in the family Vermetidae, the worm snails or worm shells.
