= Braunina =

Scientific classification
- Kingdom: Animalia
- Phylum: Platyhelminthes
- Class: Trematoda
- Order: Diplostomida
- Suborder: Diplostomata
- Superfamily: Diplostomoidea
- Family: Brauninidae; Wolf, 1903
- Genus: Braunina; Heider, 1900
- Species: B. cordiformis

Binomial name
- Braunina cordiformis Wolf, 1903

Genus of flukes

Brauninidae is a monotypic family of trematodes in the order Diplostomida. It consists of one genus, Braunina Heider, 1900, which consists of one species, Braunina cordiformis Wolf, 1903.

== Hosts ==
Braunina cordiformis has been observed to infect certain species of porpoise such as the common bottlenose dolphin (Tursiops truncatus), the common dolphin (Delphinus delphis), and the Indo-Pacific finless porpoise (Neophocaena phocaenoides). Braunina attaches to the membrane wall of its host's stomach and damages the wall's tissue, which can cause chronic gastritis in the host.
