= Ovarioptera =

Scientific classification
- Kingdom: Animalia
- Phylum: Platyhelminthes
- Class: Trematoda
- Order: Diplostomida
- Suborder: Diplostomata
- Superfamily: Brachylaimoidea
- Family: Ovariopteridae; Leonov, Spasski & Kulikov, 1963
- Genus: Ovarioptera; Leonov, Spasski & Kulikov, 1963
- Species: O. sobolevi

Binomial name
- Ovarioptera sobolevi Leonov, Spasski & Kulikov, 1963

Family of flukes

Ovarioptera is a genus of parasitic trematode in the order Diplostomida. It is the only member of the family Ovariopteridae, and is monotypic, containing the sole species Ovarioptera sobolevi.
