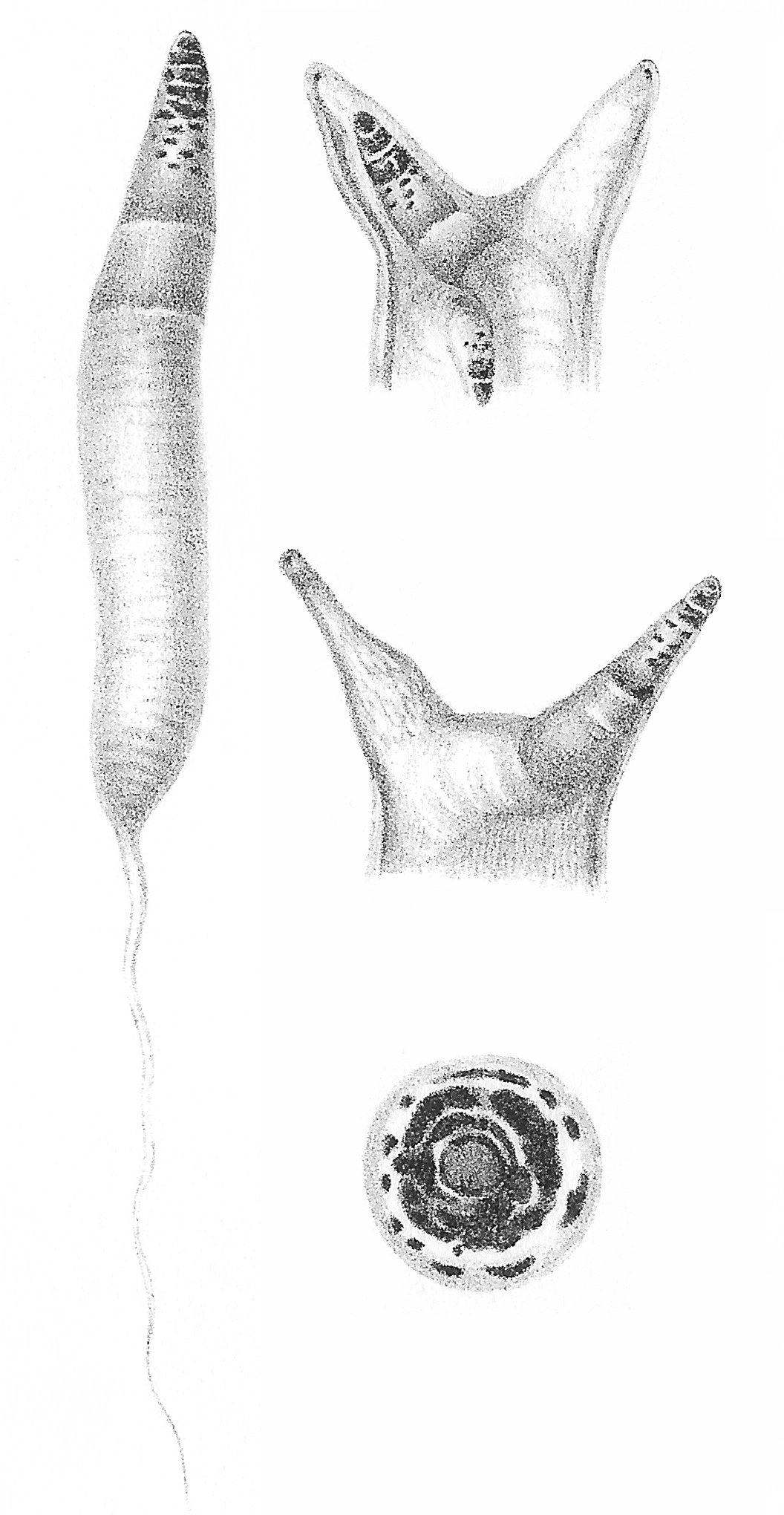
- Leucochloridium paradoxum

Scientific classification
- Kingdom: Animalia
- Phylum: Platyhelminthes
- Class: Trematoda
- Order: Diplostomida
- Suborder: Diplostomata
- Superfamily: Brachylaimoidea
- Family: Leucochloridiidae; Poche, 1907
- Genus: Leucochloridium; Carus, 1835

Species
- See text

= Leucochloridium =

Genus of flukes

Leucochloridium is a genus of parasitic trematode worms in the order Diplostomida. It Is the sole genus in the family Leucochloridiidae. Members of this genus cause pulsating swellings in the eye-stalks of snails (a phenomenon colloquially called a zombie snail), so as to attract the attention of predatory birds required in the parasites' lifecycle.

== Taxonomy ==
=== Species ===
A flatworm of the genus Leucochloridium parasitising a snail

Species in the genus Leucochloridium include:

- Leucochloridium caryocatactis (Zeder, 1800) now in genus Urogonimus
- Leucochloridium fuscostriatum Robinson, 1948 is a junior synonym of L. variae
- L. fuscum Rietschel, 1970 is a junior synonym of L. perturbatum
- Leucochloridium heckerti Kagan, 1951 is a junior synonym of L. paradoxum
- Leucochloridium holostomum (Rudolphi, 1819)
- Leucochloridium macrostomum (Rudolphi, 1803) is now in the genus Urogonimus, but the name was widely misapplied to L. paradoxum
- Leucochloridium paradoxum Carus, 1835
- Leucochloridium perturbatum Pojmańska, 1969 sometimes considered a synonym of L. variae
- Leucochloridium phragmitophila Bykhovskaja-Pavlovskja & Dubinina, 1951
- Leucochloridium sime Yamaguti, 1935 is likely a synonym of L. perturbatum.
- L. subtilis Pojmańska, 1969 is a junior synonym of L. perturbatum
- Leucochloridium variae McIntosh, 1932
- Leucochloridium vogtianum Baudon, 1881

== See also ==
- Aggressive mimicry
