= Thapariella =

Scientific classification
- Kingdom: Animalia
- Phylum: Platyhelminthes
- Class: Trematoda
- Order: Diplostomida
- Suborder: Diplostomata
- Superfamily: Brachylaimoidea
- Family: Thapariellidae; Srivastava, 1953
- Genus: Thapariella; Srivastava, 1953
- Species: T. anastomusa

Binomial name
- Thapariella anastomusa Srivastava, 1953

Species of trematode

Thapariella is a genus of parasitic trematode in the order Diplostomida. It is the only member of the family Thapariellidae, and is monotypic, containing the sole species Thapariella anastomusa.

== Hosts ==
Thapariella has two known groups of hosts. As an adult, it can be found in birds, and as larvae, they infect viviparid snails, such as some species in the genus Filopaludina.
