= Leucochloridiomorpha =

Scientific classification
- Kingdom: Animalia
- Phylum: Platyhelminthes
- Class: Trematoda
- Order: Diplostomida
- Suborder: Diplostomata
- Superfamily: Brachylaimoidea
- Family: Leucochloridiomorphidae; Yamaguti, 1958
- Genus: Leucochloridiomorpha; Gower, 1938
- Species: L. constantiae

Binomial name
- Leucochloridiomorpha constantiae (Mueller, 1935)

Genus of flukes

Leucochloridiomorpha is a genus of parasitic trematode in the order Diplostomida. It is the only member of the family Leucochloridiomorphidae, and is monotypic, containing the sole species Leucochloridiomorpha constantiae.

== Hosts ==
Leuchochloridiomorpha constantiae has been observed in Campeloma decisum, as well as in several birds and mammals. The birds and mammals consume metacercariae, which mature into adults with eggs. The eggs pass out via feces, which Campeloma then consumes, leading to infection. While infected, metacercariae build up in the uterus of the snail.
