= Thylaeodus semisurrectus =

Scientific classification
- Kingdom: Animalia
- Phylum: Mollusca
- Class: Gastropoda
- Subclass: Caenogastropoda
- Order: Littorinimorpha
- Family: Vermetidae
- Genus: Thylaeodus
- Species: T. semisurrectus

Binomial name
- Thylaeodus semisurrectus (Bivona Ant., 1832)

Synonyms
- Vermetus seguenzianus Aradas & Benoit, 1874; Vermetus semisurrectus Bivona-Bernardi, 1832 (original combination); Vermetus semisurrectus var. minor Monterosato, 1892; Vermetus semisurrectus var. typica Monterosato, 1892

Species of gastropod

Thylaeodus semisurrectus is a species of sea snail, a marine gastropod mollusk in the family Vermetidae, the worm snails or worm shells.
