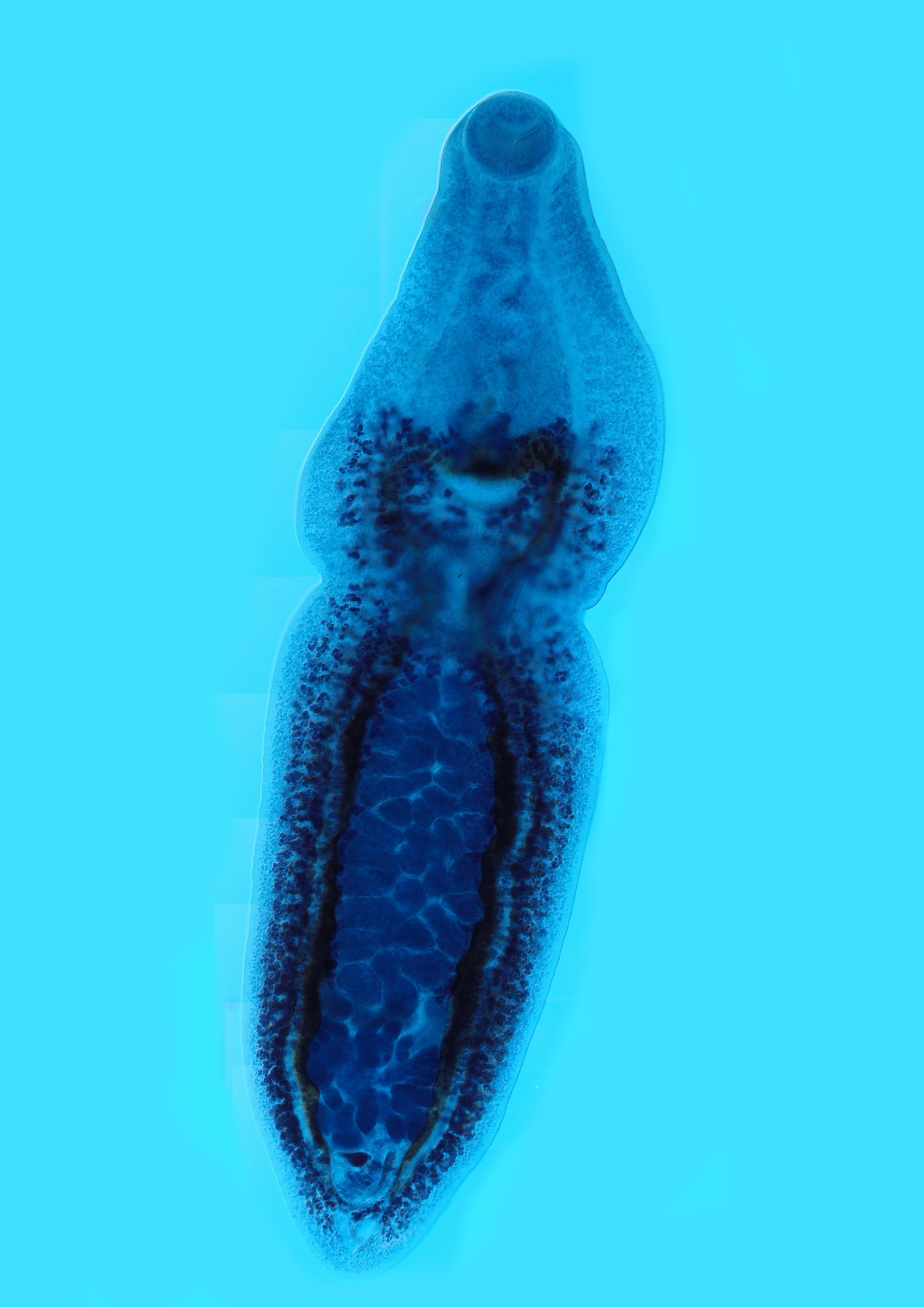
- A species of marine spirorchiid, Learedius learedi, which lives in the heart of green sea turtles. Specimen stained with Mayer's hematoxylin.

Scientific classification
- Kingdom: Animalia
- Phylum: Platyhelminthes
- Class: Trematoda
- Order: Diplostomida
- Suborder: Diplostomata
- Superfamily: Schistosomatoidea
- Family: Spirorchiidae; Stunkard, 1921

= Spirorchiidae =

Family of flukes

Spirorchiidae is a family of digenetic trematodes. Infestation by these trematodes leads to the disease spirorchiidiosis. Spirorchiids are mainly parasites of turtles. It has been synonymised with Proparorchiidae Ward, 1921, Spirorchidae Stunkard, 1921, and Spirorchiidae MacCallum, 1921.

== Genera ==
- Amphiorchis Price, 1934
- Baracktrema Roberts, Platt & Bullard in Roberts, Platt, Orélis-Ribeiro & Bullard, 2016
- Cardiotrema Dwivedi, 1967
- Carettacola Manter & Larson, 1950
- Cheloneotrema Simha & Chattopadhyaya, 1980
- Coeuritrema Mehra, 1933
- Enterohaematotrema Mehra, 1940
- Hapalorhynchus Stunkard, 1922
- Hapalotrema Looss, 1899
- Learedius Price, 1934
- Monticellius Mehra, 1939
- Neocaballerotrema Simha, 1977
- Neospirorchis Price, 1934
- Plasmiorchis Mehra, 1934
- Platt Roberts & Bullard in Roberts, Arias, Halanych, Dang & Bullard, 2018
- Satyanarayanotrema Simha & Chattopadhyaya, 1980
- Shobanatrema Simha & Chattopadhyaya, 1980
- Spirhapalum Ejsmont, 1927
- Spirorchis MacCallum, 1919
- Unicaecum Stunkard, 1925
- Uterotrema Platt & Pichelin, 1994
- Vasotrema Stunkard, 1928

== Hosts ==
Freshwater spirorchiids have been reported to infect the freshwater snails Helisoma trivolvis, Helisoma anceps, Physa sp., Menetus dilatatus, Ferrissia fragilis, Biomphalaria occide, Biomphalaria sudanica, Biomphalaria glabrata, Biomphalaria tenagophila, Pomacea sp. and Indoplanorbis exustus as intermediate hosts. Marine species have been reported to infect vermetid gastropods belonging to the genera Thylacodes, Thylaeodus, and Dendropoma, and terebellid polychaetes belonging to the genera Amphitrite and Enoplobranchus as intermediate hosts.

The cardiovascular parasites Learedius learedi, Hapalotrema postorchis, Monticellius indicum and Amphiorchis solus have been found in the green sea turtle (Chelonia mydas).

Spirhapalum siamensis is a parasite found in the heart of the Amboina box turtle (Cuora amboinensis).
