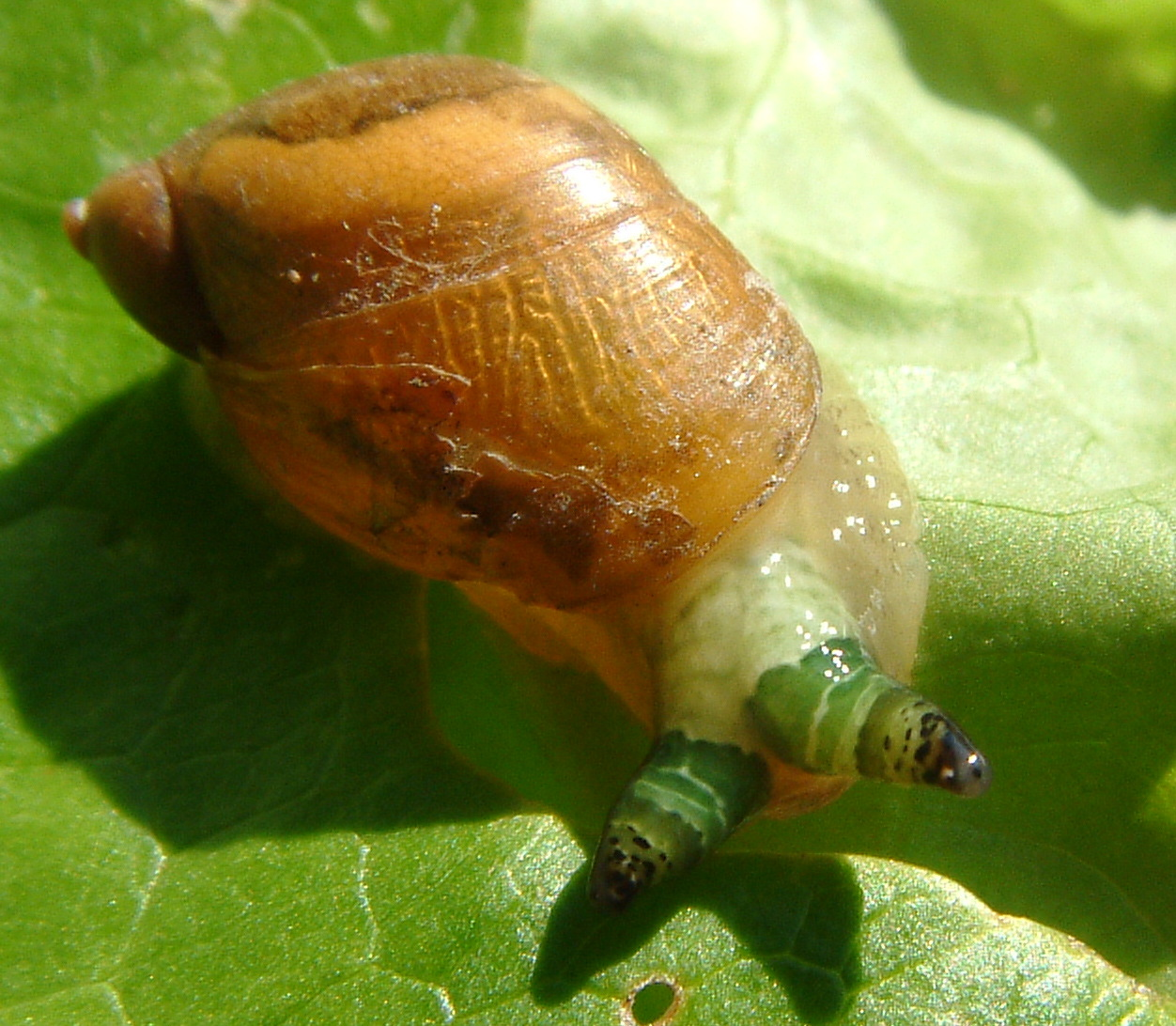
- Leucochloridium macrostomum

Scientific classification
- Kingdom: Animalia
- Phylum: Platyhelminthes
- Class: Trematoda
- Order: Diplostomida
- Suborder: Diplostomata
- Superfamily: Brachylaimoidea; Joyeux & Foley, 1930

= Brachylaimoidea =

Superfamily of flukes

Brachylaimoidea is a superfamily of digenetic trematodes in the order Diplostomida.

== Families ==
The following families are recognised:

- Brachylaimidae Joyeux & Foley, 1930
- Hasstilesiidae Hall, 1916
- Leucochloridiidae Poche, 1907
- Leucochloridiomorphidae Yamaguti, 1958
- Moreauiidae Johnstone, 1915
- Ovariopteridae Leonov, Spasski & Kulikov, 1963
- Panopistidae Yamaguti, 1958
- Thapariellidae Srivastava, 1953
