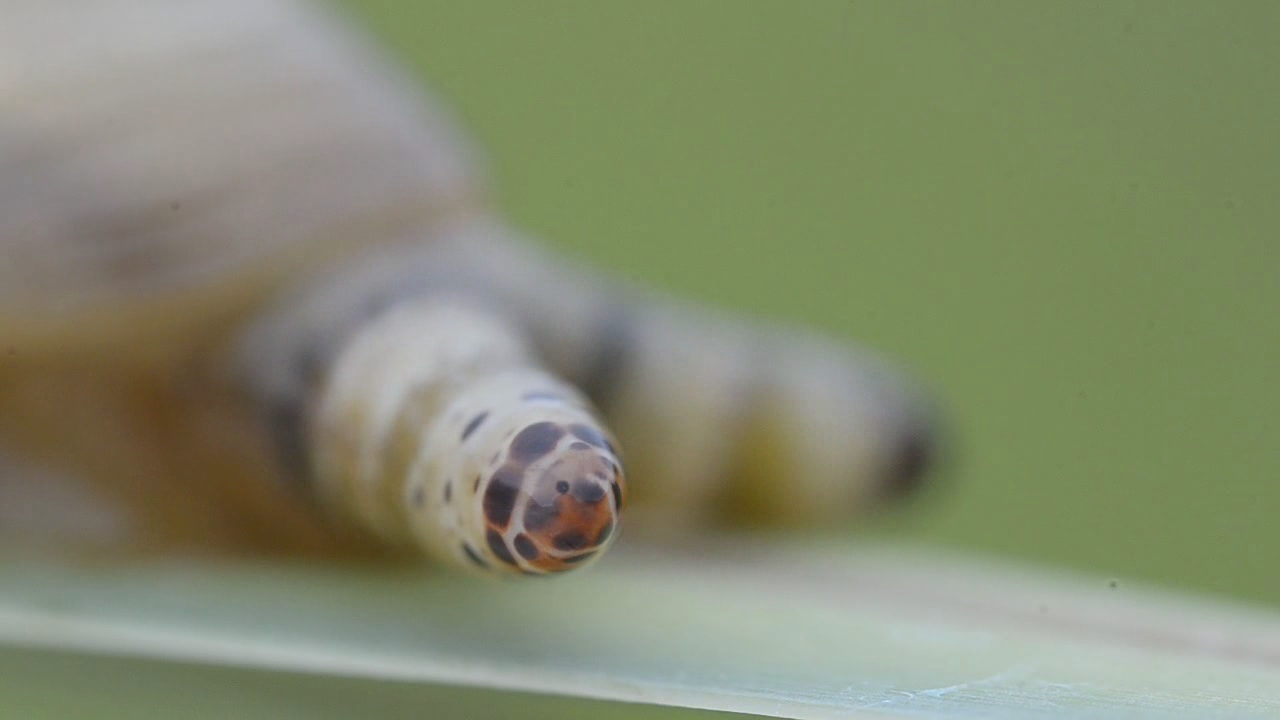

Scientific classification
- Kingdom: Animalia
- Phylum: Platyhelminthes
- Class: Trematoda
- Order: Diplostomida
- Family: Leucochloridiidae
- Genus: Leucochloridium
- Species: L. variae

Binomial name
- Leucochloridium variae McIntosh, 1932

= Leucochloridium variae =

Species of fluke

Leucochloridium variae, the brown-banded broodsac, is a species of trematode whose life cycle involves the alternate parasitic infection of certain species of snail and bird. While there is no external evidence of the worm's existence within the bird host, the infection of the snail host is visible when its eye stalks become grotesquely engorged with the parasite's brood sacs. These brood sacks pulsate and move to imitate insect larva, attracting the parasite's next host, insectivore birds. The bird rips off the eye stalk and eats it, thus becoming infected. Later on, the parasite's eggs are dropped with the bird's feces. Similar life-histories are found in other species of the genus Leucochloridium, including Leucochloridium paradoxum.

This process does not necessarily kill the snail. They can regenerate their eye stalks, and snails may become infective multiple times in their lifespan.

== Taxonomy ==
Leucochloridium variae was described on the basis of adult flukes found in black-and-white warblers (Mniotilta varia) collected at Douglas Lake in northern Michigan, USA. Two Nearctic species, Leucochloridium fuscostriatum Robinson, 1947 and Leucochloridium pricei McIntosh, 1932 are now considered to be synonyms of L. variae. It has further been proposed that L. perturbatum Pojmańska, 1969, described from Europe, should be considered the same species even though gene flow between the populations will be limited by the few birds that cross between continents. In the absence of genetic data, this synonymisation is still questioned. Other European species already considered synonyms of L. perturbatum are L. subtilis Pojmańska, 1969 and L. fuscum Rietschel, 1970. Leucochloridium sime Yamaguti, 1935 is also likely a synonym.

== Life-cycle ==
The lifecycle of L. variae is characterized by the infection of a definitive avian host through the ingestion of sporocysts contained in the intermediate Succinea host. Leucochloridium variae adults primarily live in the cloaca and intestine of their bird host, while the sporocysts live in the hepatopancreas, haemocoel and the ocular tentacles of Succineidae land snails.

=== Transmission and infection of intermediate snail hosts ===
Avian hosts release fluke eggs along with their excreta, which land on surrounding vegetation where snails may consume them. The miracidia hatch and bore through the snail’s digestive tract. The sporocyst develop in the hepatopancreas of the snail. The sporocysts grow into a tree-like structure, with some branches growing through the haemocoel to form a swollen broodsac at the end of a long stalk. Cercariae are produced by asexual reproduction at the base of the sporocyst, then migrate into a brood sac; here they mature and encyst forming metacercariae. Brood-sacs insert into the snail’s tentacles, where they mimic the appearance and behavior of insect larvae so as to attract insectivorous birds. Snails can be infected by more than one species of Leucochloridium simultaneously.

==== Broodsac description ====
Snails infected with the sporocyst exhibit distended tentacles, which disrupts the snail’s normal ability to retract into their shell. Broodsacs contain multiple free floating metacercariae. Light intensity affects the rate at which the broodsacs pulsate. Broodsacs normally pulsate between forty and eighty times per minute. The pulsating movement is described as an alternation of shortening and lengthening of the broodsac. Broodsacs do not pulsate in complete darkness.

=== Transmission and infection of avian definitive hosts ===
The insectivorous birds are attracted to the pulsating broodsac. This will cause the birds to attack and ingest the broodsacs located in the snail's tentacles. Inside the bird's gut, the metacercariae develop into adults. Adult Leucochloridium variae are hermaphroditic helminths, but can cross fertilize with other worms if in close enough proximity. The gravid adults will release their eggs into the intestines of the bird to be excreted out with the bird’s feces; thus, continuing the Leucochloridium lifecycle. Intense infestation by the worms can lead to emaciation and death in birds. Birds may also freeze to death from the lack of adipose tissue.

==== Gravid adult description ====
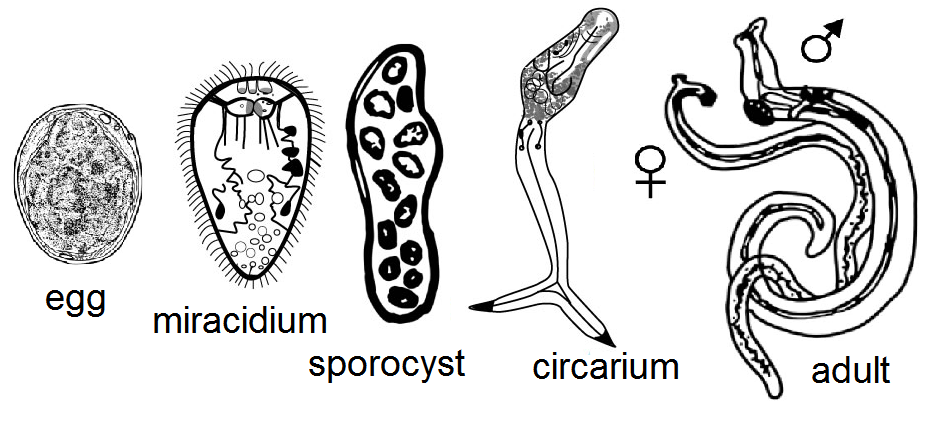
Stages of the trematode life-cycle

Adult worms are characterized by a flesh-colored body containing an egg-filled uterus that appears black by reflected light. The worms contain a cuticula with a subterminal oral sucker. They also contain a muscular pharynx, ventral sucker, and ceca. The gonads of the worm are arranged in a triangle, containing an ovary with an anterior and posterior testis. The oral sucker is primarily used for the attachment to the avian cloaca. It must withstand the constriction of cloaca, which occurs during defecation. Leucochloridium contains a smooth oral sucker, which functions by forming a tight seal against the host’s mucosa. Leucochloridium also contains a smooth dorsal side, which aids in decreasing friction of passing stool. The rest of the fluke is covered in microvilli that are used to anchor it to the inside of the cloaca. Leucochloridium variae tegument is considered finely spined.

== Behavioral differences in infected intermediate hosts ==
Parasites may induce certain behavioral changes in their hosts in order to aid in the transmission and completion of its life cycle. Land snails parasitized by Leucochloridium spp. experience phenotypic modification through the pulsating brood sacs. Infected snails were found to have increased mobility, which allows them to migrate to higher and more well lit areas. Healthy snails seek darkness to hide from predators, but the infected amber snail moves itself into dangerous open and well lit spaces, thus making them more susceptible and accessible to avian predation.

== Distribution and history ==
Leucochloridium variae commonly parasitizes Mniotilta varia and has been collected from lakes in the Michigan area. Other known locations that L. variae are known to inhabit are Iowa, Nebraska, Ohio and others.

== Hosts ==
Intermediate host of Leucochloridium variae include:

- Novisuccinea ovalis

There was no finding of difference in length of shells in parasitized and in non-parasitized snails.

Hosts of Leucochloridium variae include:

- American robin
- Common gull - experimental host
- Zebra finch - experimental host
