= Thylaeodus =

Scientific classification
- Kingdom: Animalia
- Phylum: Mollusca
- Class: Gastropoda
- Subclass: Caenogastropoda
- Order: Littorinimorpha
- Family: Vermetidae
- Genus: Thylaeodus; Mörch, 1860

Type species
- Bivonia contorta Carpenter, 1857

Genus of gastropods

Thylaeodus is a genus of sea snails, marine gastropod mollusks in the family Vermetidae, the worm snails or worm shells.

== Species ==
Species within the genus Thylaeodus include:

- Thylaeodus contortus (Carpenter, 1857)
- Thylaeodus equatorialis Spotorno & Simone, 2013
- Thylaeodus indentatus (Carpenter, 1857)
- Thylaeodus rugulosus (Monterosato, 1878)
- Thylaeodus semisurrectus (Bivona-Bernardi, 1832)
