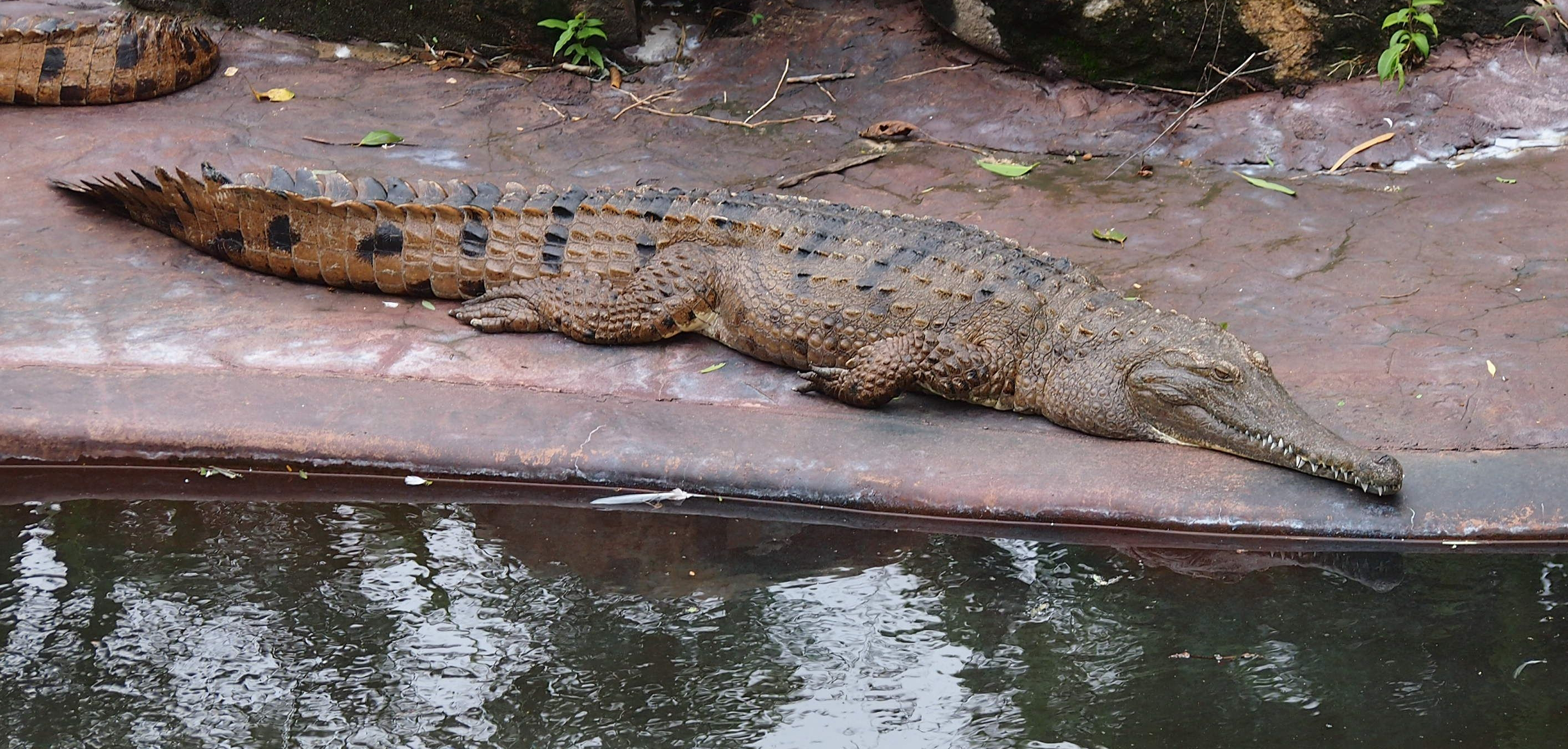
- At Rockhampton Zoo

Conservation status
- Least Concern (IUCN 3.1)
- CITES Appendix II

Scientific classification
- Kingdom: Animalia
- Phylum: Chordata
- Class: Reptilia
- Order: Crocodylia
- Family: Crocodylidae
- Genus: Crocodylus
- Species: C. johnstoni

Binomial name
- Crocodylus johnstoni Krefft, 1873
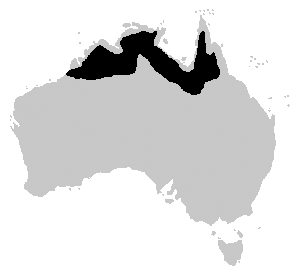
- Range of the freshwater crocodile in black

Synonyms
- Crocodilus johnsoni Krefft, 1873; Crocodilus (Philas) johnstoni — Gray, 1874; Philas johnstoni — Wells & Wellington, 1984; Crocodylus johnstoni — Cogger, 2000

= Freshwater crocodile =

Freshwater crocodile Temporal range: Pleistocene–present, 2.6–0 Ma

Species of reptile

The freshwater crocodile (Crocodylus johnstoni), also known commonly as the Australian freshwater crocodile, Johnstone's crocodile, Johnstone river crocodile and the freshie, is a species of crocodile native to the northern regions of Australia. Unlike its much larger Australian relative, the saltwater crocodile, the freshwater crocodile is not known as a man-eater, although it only bites in self-defence, and brief, nonfatal attacks have occurred, apparently the result of mistaken identity.

== Taxonomy and etymology ==
When Gerard Krefft named the species in 1873, he intended to commemorate the man who first sent him preserved specimens, Australian native police officer and amateur naturalist Robert Arthur Johnstone (1843–1905). However, Krefft made an error in writing the name, and for many years, the species has been known as C. johnsoni. Recent studies of Krefft's papers have determined the correct spelling of the name, and much of the literature has been updated to the correct usage, but both versions still exist. According to the rules of the International Code of Zoological Nomenclature, the epithet johnstoni (rather than the original johnsoni) is correct.

=== Evolution ===
The genus Crocodylus likely originated in Africa and radiated outwards towards Southeast Asia and the Americas, although an Australia/Asia origin has also been considered. Phylogenetic evidence supports Crocodylus diverging from its closest recent relative, the extinct Voay of Madagascar, around 25 million years ago, near the Oligocene/Miocene boundary.

=== Phylogeny ===
Below is a cladogram based on a 2018 tip dating study by Lee & Yates simultaneously using morphological, molecular (DNA sequencing), and stratigraphic (fossil age) data, as revised by the 2021 Hekkala et al. paleogenomics study using DNA extracted from the extinct Voay. Hall's New Guinea crocodile placement suggested in 2023 study by Sales-Oliveira et al.

- Crocodylus
  - - - - - - Crocodylus johnstoni Freshwater crocodile
      - - - - Crocodylus novaeguineae New Guinea crocodile
          - - Crocodylus halli Hall's New Guinea crocodile
        - - - Crocodylus mindorensis Philippine crocodile
    - - - - - Crocodylus porosus Saltwater crocodile
      - - - - Crocodylus siamensis Siamese crocodile
        - - - Crocodylus palustris Mugger crocodile
  - - - - - - Crocodylus suchus West African crocodile
    - - - - - Crocodylus niloticus Nile crocodile
      - - - - Crocodylus rhombifer Cuban crocodile
        - - - Crocodylus intermedius Orinoco crocodile
            - Crocodylus acutus American crocodile
          - - Crocodylus moreletii Morelet's crocodile

== Description ==
The freshwater crocodile is a relatively small crocodilian. Typically, males can grow to a total length (including tail) of 2.3–3.0 m (7.5–9.8 ft) if a dominant male, although there are reported specimens of 4 metres in length (see below), while females reach a maximum size of 2.1 m (6.9 ft). Males commonly weigh around 70 kg (150 lb), with large specimens up to 100 kg (220 lb) or more, against the female weight of 40 kg (88 lb). In areas such as Lake Argyle and Katherine Gorge, a handful of confirmed 4-metre (13-foot) individuals exist. This species is shy and has a slenderer snout and slightly smaller teeth than the dangerous saltwater crocodile. The body colour is light brown with darker bands on the body and tail. These bands tend to be broken up near the neck. Some individuals possess distinct bands or speckling on the snout. Body scales are relatively large, with wide, close-knit, armoured plates on the back. Rounded, pebbly scales cover the flanks and outsides of the legs.

== Distribution and habitat ==
Freshwater crocodiles are found in Western Australia, Queensland, and the Northern Territory. Main habitats include freshwater wetlands, billabongs, rivers, and creeks. This species can live in areas where saltwater crocodiles cannot, and are known to inhabit areas above the escarpment in Kakadu National Park and in very arid and rocky conditions (such as Katherine Gorge, where they are common and are relatively safe from saltwater crocodiles during the dry season). However, they are still consistently found in low-level billabongs, living alongside the saltwater crocodiles near the tidal reaches of rivers.

In May 2013, a freshwater crocodile was seen in a river near the desert town of Birdsville, hundreds of kilometres south of their normal range. A local ranger suggested that years of flooding may have washed the animal south, or it may have been dumped as a juvenile.

A population of freshwater crocodiles has been repeatedly sighted for a number of decades in the Ross River that runs through Townsville. The predominant theory is that the heavy flooding common to the area may have washed a number of the animals in to the Ross River Catchment area.

== Biology and behaviour ==
They compete poorly with saltwater crocodiles, but are saltwater tolerant.

An individual being eaten by an olive python has been filmed; it was reported to have succumbed after a struggle of around five hours.

=== Reproduction ===
Eggs are laid in holes during the Australian dry season (usually in August) and hatch at the beginning of the wet season (November/December). The crocodiles do not defend their nests during incubation. From one to five days prior to hatching, the young begin to call from within the eggs. This induces and synchronizes hatching in siblings and stimulates adults to open the nest. If the adult that opens a given nest is the female which laid the eggs is unknown. As young emerge from the nest, the adult picks them up one by one in the tip of its mouth and transports them to the water. Adults may also assist young in breaking through the egg shell by chewing or manipulating the eggs in its mouth.

=== Diet ===
Feeding in the wild, freshwater crocodiles eat a variety of invertebrate and vertebrate prey. These prey may include crustaceans, insects, spiders, fish, frogs, turtles, snakes, birds, and various mammals. Insects appear to be the most common food, followed by fish. Small prey is usually obtained by a 'sit-and-wait' method, whereby the crocodile lies motionless in shallow water and waits for fish and insects to come within close range, before they are snapped up in a sideways action. However, larger prey such as wallabies and water birds may be stalked and ambushed in a manner similar to that of the saltwater crocodile.

==== Digestive system ====
The crocodiles have teeth that have adapted for capturing and holding prey, and food is swallowed without chewing. The digestive tract is short, as their food is relatively simple to swallow and digest. The stomach has two compartments - a muscular gizzard that grinds food, and a digestive chamber where enzymes act on the food. The crocodile's stomach is comparatively more acidic than that of any other vertebrate and contains ridges that lead to the mechanical breakdown of food. Digestion takes place at a faster pace at high temperatures.

==== Circulation system ====
The hearts of other reptiles are designed to contain three sections, including two atria and one ventricle. The right atrium, which collects the returned deoxygenated blood and the left atrium, which collects the oxygenated blood collected from pulmonary arteries of the lung, takes the blood to a common ventricle. When just one ventricle is available to receive and mix oxygenated and deoxygenated blood and pump it to the body, the mixture of blood the body receives has relatively less oxygen. Crocodiles have a more complex vertebrate circulatory system, with a four-chambered heart, including two ventricles. Like birds and mammals, crocodiles have heart valves that direct blood flows in a single direction through the heart chambers. When under water, the crocodile's heart rate slows down to one to two beats a minute, and muscles receive less blood flow. When it comes out of the water and takes a breath, its heart rate speeds up in seconds, and the muscles receive oxygen-rich blood. Unlike many marine mammals, crocodiles have only a small amount of myoglobin to store oxygen in their muscles.

== Conservation status ==
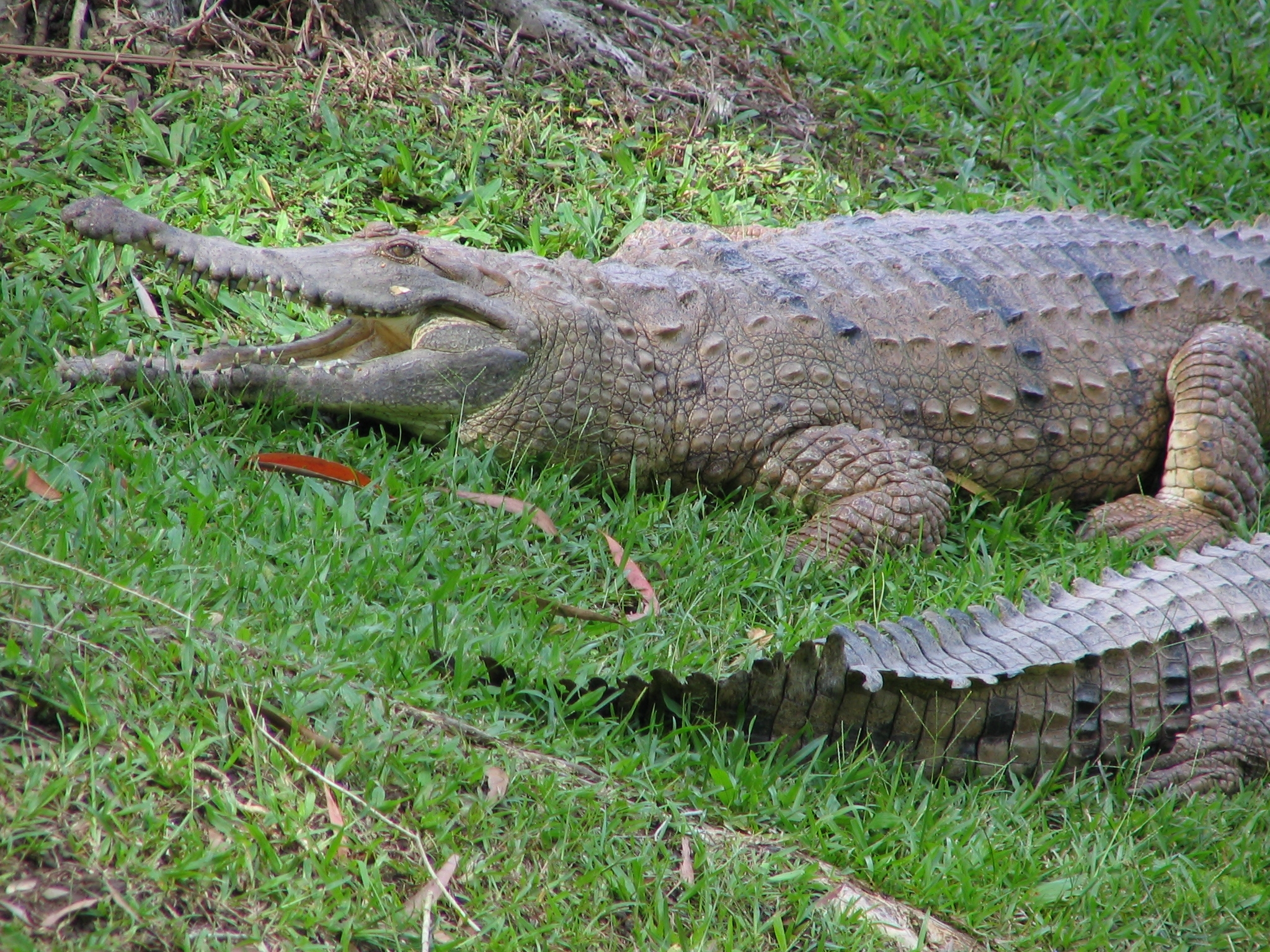
Freshwater crocodile at Australia Zoo

Until recently, the freshwater crocodile was common in northern Australia, especially where saltwater crocodiles are absent (such as more arid inland areas and higher elevations). In recent years, the population has dropped dramatically due to the ingestion of the invasive cane toad. The toad is poisonous to freshwater crocodiles, although not to saltwater crocodiles, and the toad is rampant throughout the northern Australian bush. The crocodiles are also infected by Griphobilharzia amoena, a parasitic trematode, in regions such as Darwin.

== Relationship with humans ==
Although the freshwater crocodile does not attack humans as potential prey, it can deliver a nasty bite. Brief and rapidly abandoned attacks have occurred, and were likely the result of mistaken identity (mistaking a part of the human as a typical prey item). Other attacks have occurred in self defense when the crocodile was touched or approached too closely. No human fatalities are known to have been caused by this species. A few incidents have been reported where people have been bitten whilst swimming with freshwater crocodiles, and others incurred during scientific study. An attack by a freshwater crocodile on a human was recorded at Barramundi Gorge (also known as Maguk) in Kakadu National Park and resulted in minor injuries; the victim managed to swim and walk away from the attack. He had apparently passed directly over the crocodile in the water. In general, though, swimming with this species is still considered safe, so long as they are not aggravated. There has, however, been a freshwater crocodile attack at Lake Argyle.

== Gallery ==
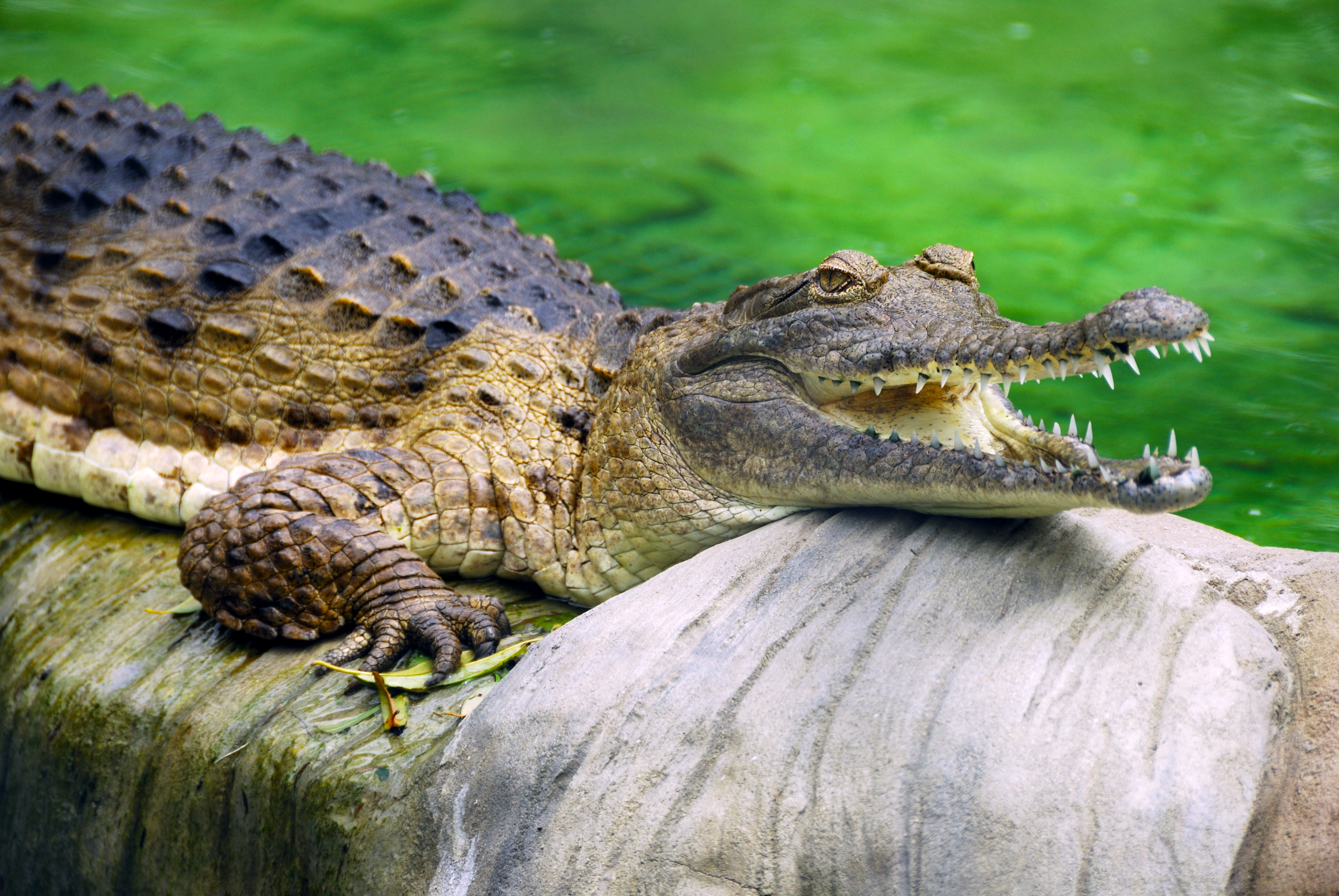
Head of a freshwater crocodile

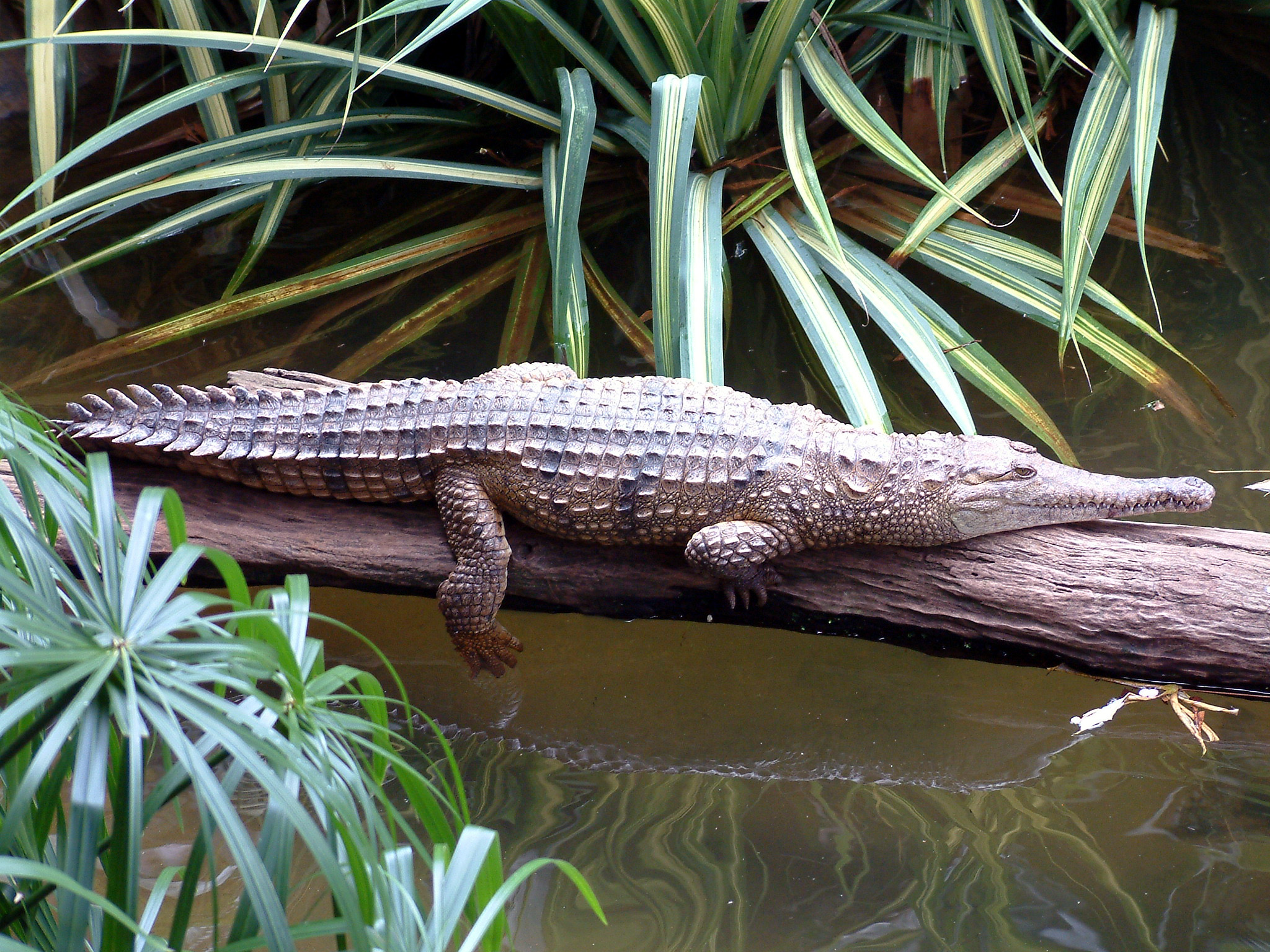
Freshwater crocodile basking on a log

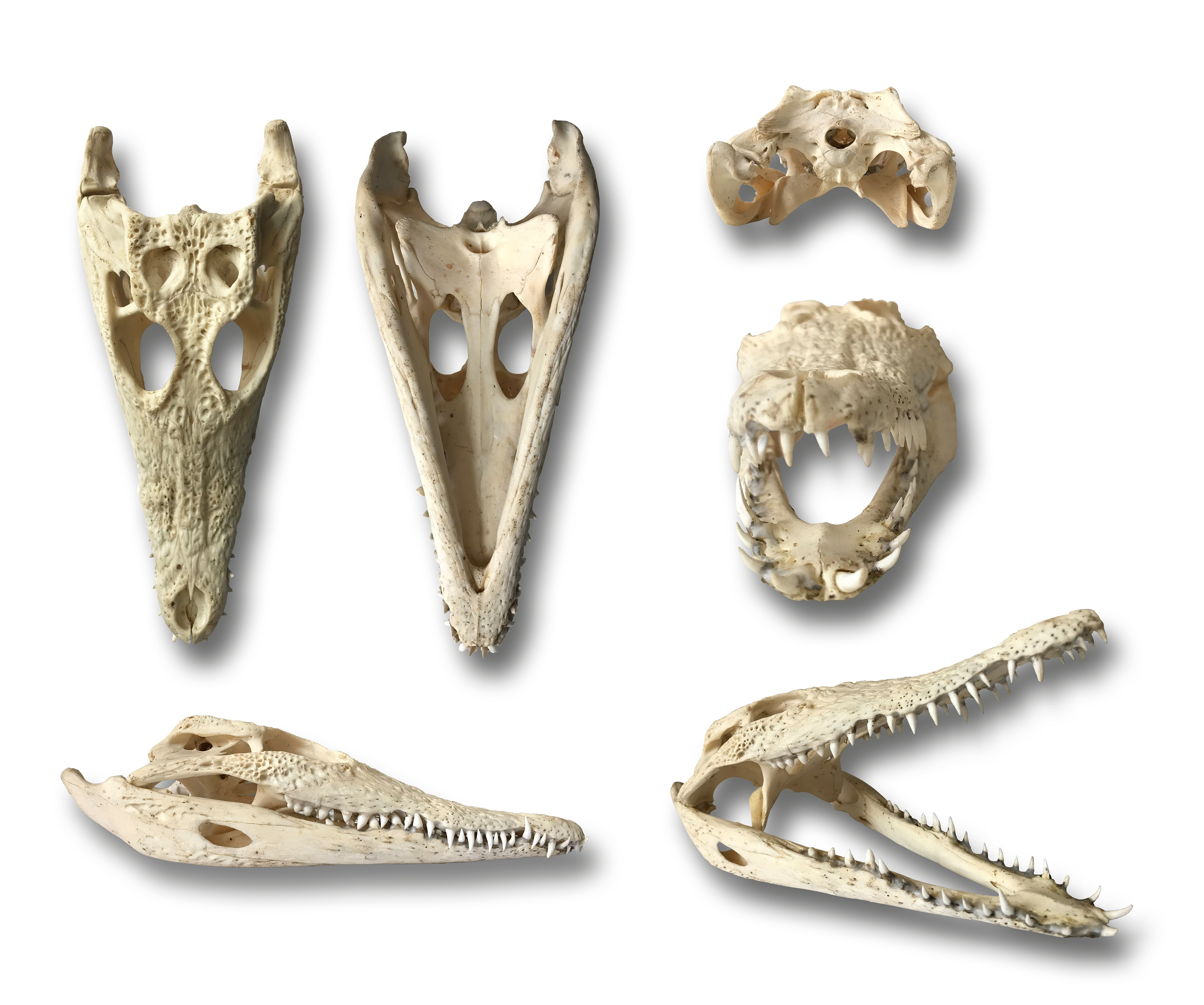
Various skull views of an "Australia crocodile" (Crocodylus johnsoni)
