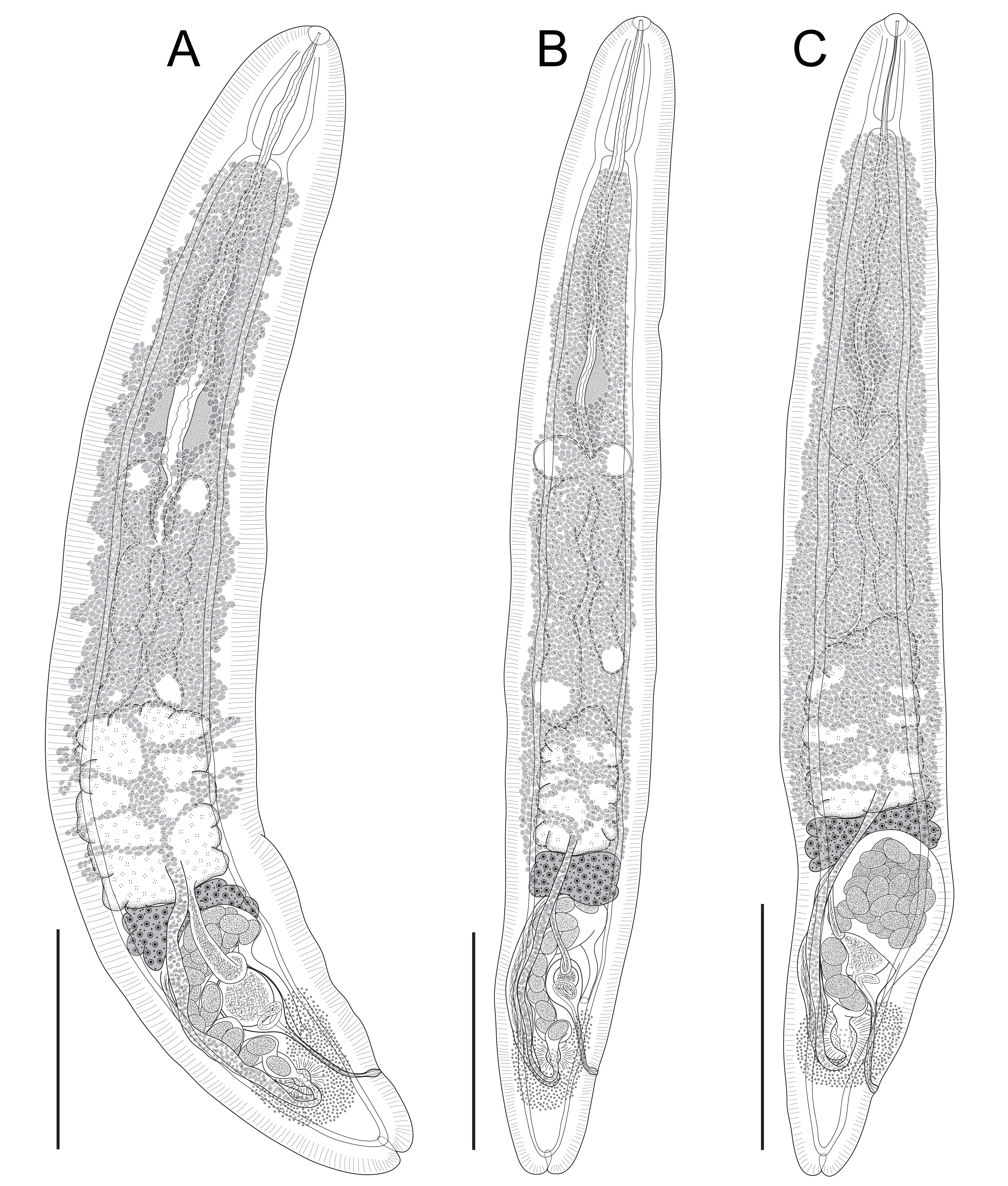
- Holocentricola spp. (Aporocotylidae)

Scientific classification
- Kingdom: Animalia
- Phylum: Platyhelminthes
- Class: Trematoda
- Order: Diplostomida
- Suborder: Diplostomata
- Superfamily: Schistosomatoidea
- Family: Aporocotylidae; Odhner, 1912

= Aporocotylidae =

Family of flukes

Aporocotylidae is a family of trematodes within the order Diplostomida, which contains species commonly known as fish blood flukes. It contains more than 40 genera, the largest being Cardicola. Species in this family parasite fish in both fresh and marine water.

== Genera ==
- Acipensericola Bullard, Snyder, Jensen & Overstreet, 2008
- Adelomyllos Nolan & Cribb, 2004
- Ankistromeces Nolan & Cribb, 2004
- Aporocotyle Odhner, 1900
- Cardallagium Yong, Cutmore, Jones, Gauthier & Cribb, 2017
- Cardicola Short, 1953
- Chaulioleptos Nolan & Cribb, 2005
- Chimaerohemecus van der Land, 1967
- Cladocaecum Orelis-Ribeiro & Bullard, 2016
- Cruoricola Herbert, Shaharom-Harrison & Overstreet, 1994
- Deontacylix Linton, 1910
- Elaphrobates Bullard & Overstreet, 2003
- Elopicola Bullard, 2014
- Holocentricola Cutmore & Cribb, 2021
- Hyperandrotrema Maillard & Ktari, 1978
- Kritsky Orelis-Ribeiro & Bullard, 2016
- Littorellicola Bullard, 2010
- Metaplehniella Lebedev & Parukhin, 1972
- Myliobaticola Bullard & Jensen, 2008
- Neoparacardicola Yamaguti, 1970
- Orchispirium Madhavi & Hanumantha Rao, 1970
- Paracardicoloides Martin, 1974
- Paradeontacylix McIntosh, 1934
- Parasanguinicola Herbert & Shaharom, 1995
- Pearsonellum Overstreet & Køie, 1989
- Phthinomita Nolan & Cribb, 2006
- Plethorchis Martin, 1975
- Primisanguis Bullard, Williams & Bunkley-Williams, 2012
- Psettarium Goto & Ozaki, 1930
- Pseudocardicola Parukhin, 1985
- Rhaphidotrema Yong & Cribb, 2011
- Sanguinicola Plehn, 1905
- Selachohemecus Short, 1954
- Skoulekia Alama-Bermejo, Montero, Raga & Holzer, 2011
