= Cyathocotylidae =

Scientific classification
- Kingdom: Animalia
- Phylum: Platyhelminthes
- Class: Trematoda
- Order: Diplostomida
- Suborder: Diplostomata
- Superfamily: Diplostomoidea
- Family: Cyathocotylidae; Mühling, 1898

Family of flukes

Cyathocotylidae is a family of trematodes in the order Diplostomida.

== Genera ==
- Holostephanus Szidat, 1936
- Mesostephanus Lutz, 1935
- Neogogatea Chandler & Rausch, 1947
- Paracoenogonimus Katsurada, 1914
- Prohemistomum Odhner, 1913
- Pseudhemistomum Szidat, 1936
