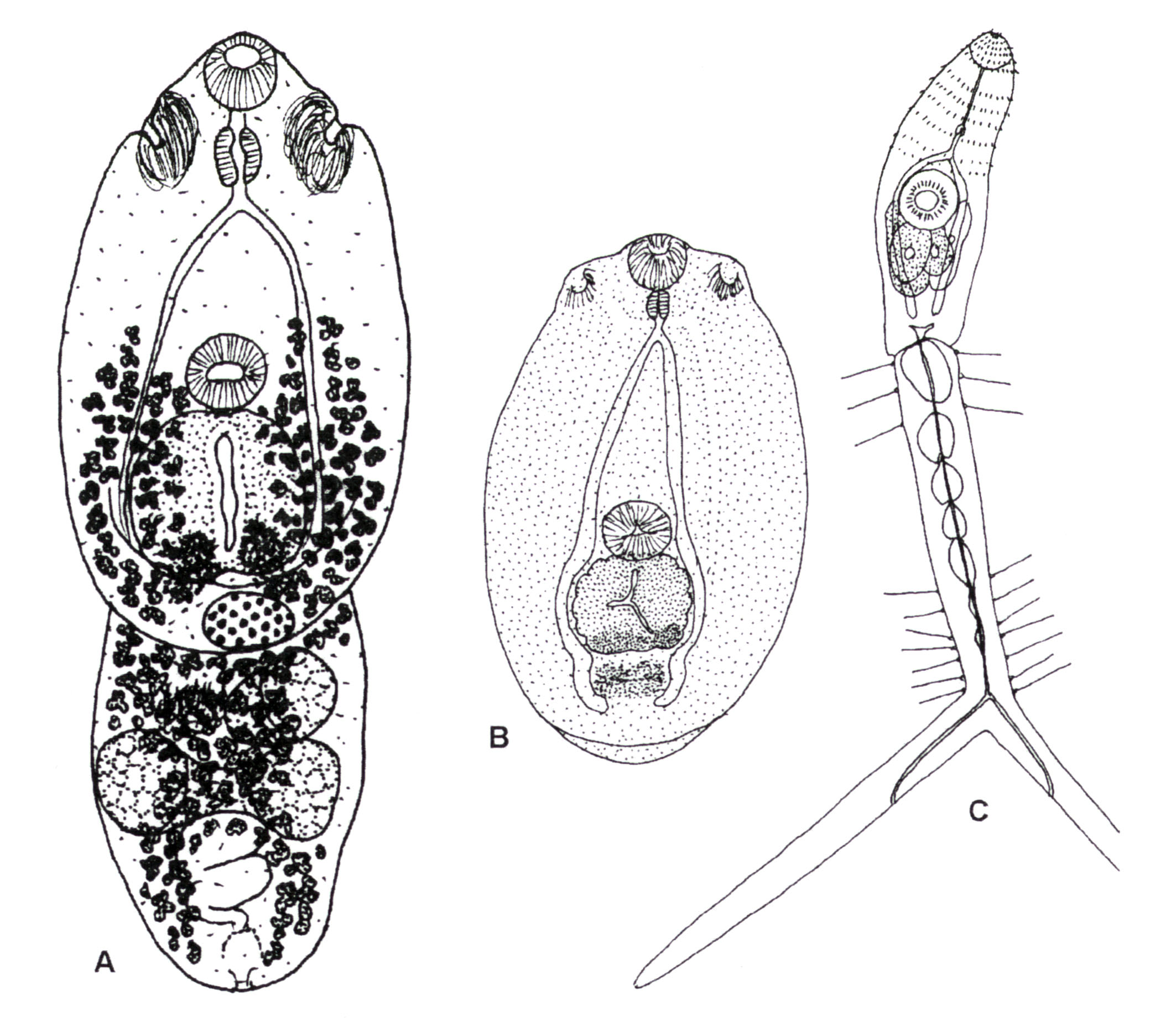
- Diplostomum petromyzifluviatilis, in the family Diplostomidae

Scientific classification
- Kingdom: Animalia
- Phylum: Platyhelminthes
- Class: Trematoda
- Subclass: Digenea
- Order: Diplostomida; Olson, Cribb, Tkach, Bray & Littlewood, 2003

= Diplostomida =

Order of flukes

Diplostomida is an order of trematodes in the subclass Digenea. It is synonymous with Strigeatida Poche, 1926.

== Families ==
Order Diplostomida

- Suborder Diplostomata
  - Superfamily Brachylaimoidea Joyeux & Foley, 1930
    - Brachylaimidae Joyeux & Foley, 1930
    - Hasstilesiidae Hall, 1916
    - Leucochloridiidae Poche, 1907
    - Leucochloridiomorphidae Yamaguti, 1958
    - Moreauiidae Johnstone, 1915
    - Ovariopteridae Leonov, Spasski & Kulikov, 1963
    - Panopistidae Yamaguti, 1958
    - Thapariellidae Srivastava, 1953
  - Superfamily Diplostomoidea Poirier, 1886
    - Bolbocephalodidae Strand, 1935
    - Brauninidae Wolf, 1903
    - Cyathocotylidae Mühling, 1898
    - Diplostomidae Poirier, 1886
    - Strigeidae Railliet, 1919
  - Superfamily Schistosomatoidea Stiles & Hassall, 1898
    - Aporocotylidae Odhner, 1912
    - Clinostomidae Lühe, 1901
    - Schistosomatidae Stiles & Hassall, 1898
    - Spirorchiidae Stunkard, 1921

Clinostomoidea Lühe, 1901 has been synonymised with Schistosomatoidea Stiles & Hassall, 1898.
