= Gorgodera amplicava =

Scientific classification
- Kingdom: Animalia
- Phylum: Platyhelminthes
- Class: Trematoda
- Order: Plagiorchiida
- Family: Gorgoderidae
- Genus: Gorgodera
- Species: G. amplicava

Binomial name
- Gorgodera amplicava Looss, 1899

Species of fluke

Gorgodera amplicava is a species of digenetic trematodes whose definitive hosts include amphibians. Its first intermediate host includes the fingernail clam, which is followed by a second intermediate host, which can be a snail, tadpole, or crayfish. Gorgodera is a distome, meaning its body includes two suckers, one oral and one ventral.
