= Anaporrhutum mundae =

Scientific classification
- Kingdom: Animalia
- Phylum: Platyhelminthes
- Class: Trematoda
- Order: Plagiorchiida
- Family: Gorgoderidae
- Genus: Anaporrhutum
- Species: A. mundae

Binomial name
- Anaporrhutum mundae Santoro, López-Verdejo, Angulo, Rojas, & Solano-Barquero, 2024

Parasitic flatworm from Costa Rica

Anaporrhutum mundae is a parasitic flatworm trematode species, belonging to the family Gorgoderidae. It was newly classified in 2024 and is a new recorded species of Anaporrhutum in Costa Rica. Along the Pacific coast of Costa Rica, the host Urotrygon munda (Munda Round Ray) is parasitized in the gill chambers.

== Taxonomy ==
Based on their description of light and scanning electron microscopy, ITS2/28S rDNA sequencing, and phylogenetic analysis (an integrative taxonomic approach), they identified it as part of the Gorgoderidae family, which specifically targets fish or even amphibians. Although the authors describe, "...scanning electron microscopy, allowed detection of new morphological characters for a member of Anaporrhutinae that may be of taxonomic value," differs from other species with genital pore openings, fewer follicles in the testes, forbody shape, and location of its viteellaria.

== Biology ==
The body of the A. mundae is flat, oval, large, long, and wide. Its body is separated into 3 sections: forebody (small), hindbody (big), and forebody (long). The tegument is wrinkled, causing a lack of a spine. The oral sucker and ventral sucker are positioned at the end of the body, with a gland opening on both sides of the body.

== Reproductive system ==
=== Male ===
- Small oval unlobed testicular follicles on each side; the right side contains 7-9, and the left side contains 7-11.
- Long and curved seminal vesicle
- Pars prostatica
- Short ejaculatory duct that leads to the genital atrium
- No cirrus sac present

=== Female ===
- Pretesticular ovary (ovary in front of testes) in the middle of the body
- Mehlis's gland is globular and long
- Tubular vitellarium
- The uterus forms a loop when going to and from the sucker.
- The eggs are oval and within a thick wall, protecting them.

== Life cycle ==
Since only the adult form of A. mundae was described, the full life cycle is unknown. We do know that the adult forms will be found in the gill chambers of the Urotrygon munda. But, the authors mention, "Two- or three-host life cycles have been revealed only for some members of freshwater Gorgoderinae, with bivalves as first intermediate hosts, and insects, snails, crayfish, or amphibian tadpoles as second intermediate hosts (Campbell Reference Campbell, Bray, Gibson and Jones2008)."
