= Gorgodera =

Scientific classification
- Kingdom: Animalia
- Phylum: Platyhelminthes
- Class: Trematoda
- Order: Plagiorchiida
- Family: Gorgoderidae
- Genus: Gorgodera; Looss, 1899

Genus of flatworms

Gorgodera is a genus of flatworms belonging to the family Gorgoderidae.

The species of this genus are found in Europe, Northern America, Australia.

Species:

- Gorgodera amplicava Looss, 1899
- Gorgodera asiatica Pigulewski, 1943
- Gorgodera attenuata Stafford, 1902
- Gorgodera australiensis Johnston, 1912
- Gorgodera circava Guberlet, 1920
- Gorgodera cygnoides (Zeder, 1800)
- Gorgodera cylindrica Meskal, 1970
- Gorgodera dollfusi Pigulewsky, 1946
- Gorgodera dunhua Wang, Jin & Zhang, 1991
- Gorgodera euzeti Lees & Combes, 1968
- Gorgodera granatensis Gonzalez-Castro, 1942
- Gorgodera japonica Yamaguti, 1936
- Gorgodera loossi Sinitzin, 1905
- Gorgodera media Strom, 1940
- Gorgodera microovata Fuhrmann, 1924
- Gorgodera minima Cort, 1912
- Gorgodera opaca Stafford, 1902
- Gorgodera pagenstecheri Sinitzin, 1905
- Gorgodera pawlowskyi Pigulewski, 1952
- Gorgodera permagna Lutz, 1926
- Gorgodera simplex Looss, 1899
- Gorgodera translucida Stafford, 1902
- Gorgodera unexpecta Chin, 1963
- Gorgodera varsoviensis Sinitzin, 1905
