= Degeneria halosauri =

Scientific classification
- Domain: Eukaryota
- Kingdom: Animalia
- Phylum: Platyhelminthes
- Class: Trematoda
- Order: Plagiorchiida
- Superfamily: Gorgoderoidea
- Family: Gorgoderidae
- Genus: Degeneria; Campbell, 1977
- Species: D. halosauri

Binomial name
- Degeneria halosauri (Bell, 1887) Campbell, 1977

Species of flatworm

Degeneria halosauri is a species of trematodes belonging to the family Gorgoderidae. It is the only species in the monotypic genus Degeneria.

The species inhabits marine environment.

The species was originally described as Distomum halosauri in 1887 by Bell.
