= Phyllodistomum =

Scientific classification
- Kingdom: Animalia
- Phylum: Platyhelminthes
- Class: Trematoda
- Order: Plagiorchiida
- Family: Gorgoderidae
- Genus: Phyllodistomum; Braun, 1899

Genus of flatworms

Phyllodistomum is a genus of flatworms belonging to the family Gorgoderidae.

The genus has cosmopolitan distribution.

Species:

- Phyllodistomum acceptum Looss, 1901
- Phyllodistomum almorii Pande, 1937
