= Gorgoderidae =

Scientific classification
- Kingdom: Animalia
- Phylum: Platyhelminthes
- Class: Trematoda
- Order: Plagiorchiida
- Suborder: Xiphidiata
- Superfamily: Gorgoderoidea
- Family: Gorgoderidae; Looss, 1899

Family of flukes

Gorgoderidae is a family of trematodes in the order Plagiorchiida.

== Genera ==
Family Gorgoderidae

- Subfamily Anporrhutinae Looss, 1901
  - Anaporrhutum Brandes in Ofenheim, 1900
  - Bicornuata Pearse, 1949
  - Nagmia Nagaty, 1930
  - Petalodistomum Johnston, 1913
  - Plesiochorus Looss, 1901
  - Probolitrema Looss, 1902
  - Staphylorchis Travassos, 1922
- Subfamily Degeneriinae Cutmore, Miller, Curran, Bennett & Cribb, 2013
  - Degeneria Campbell, 1977
- Subfamily Gorgoderinae Looss, 1899
  - Gorgodera Looss, 1899
  - Cetiotrema Manter, 1970
  - Phyllodistomum Braun, 1899
  - Pseudophyllodistomum Cribb, 1987
  - Xystretrum Linton, 1910
- Unranked
  - Dendrorchis Travassos, 1926
