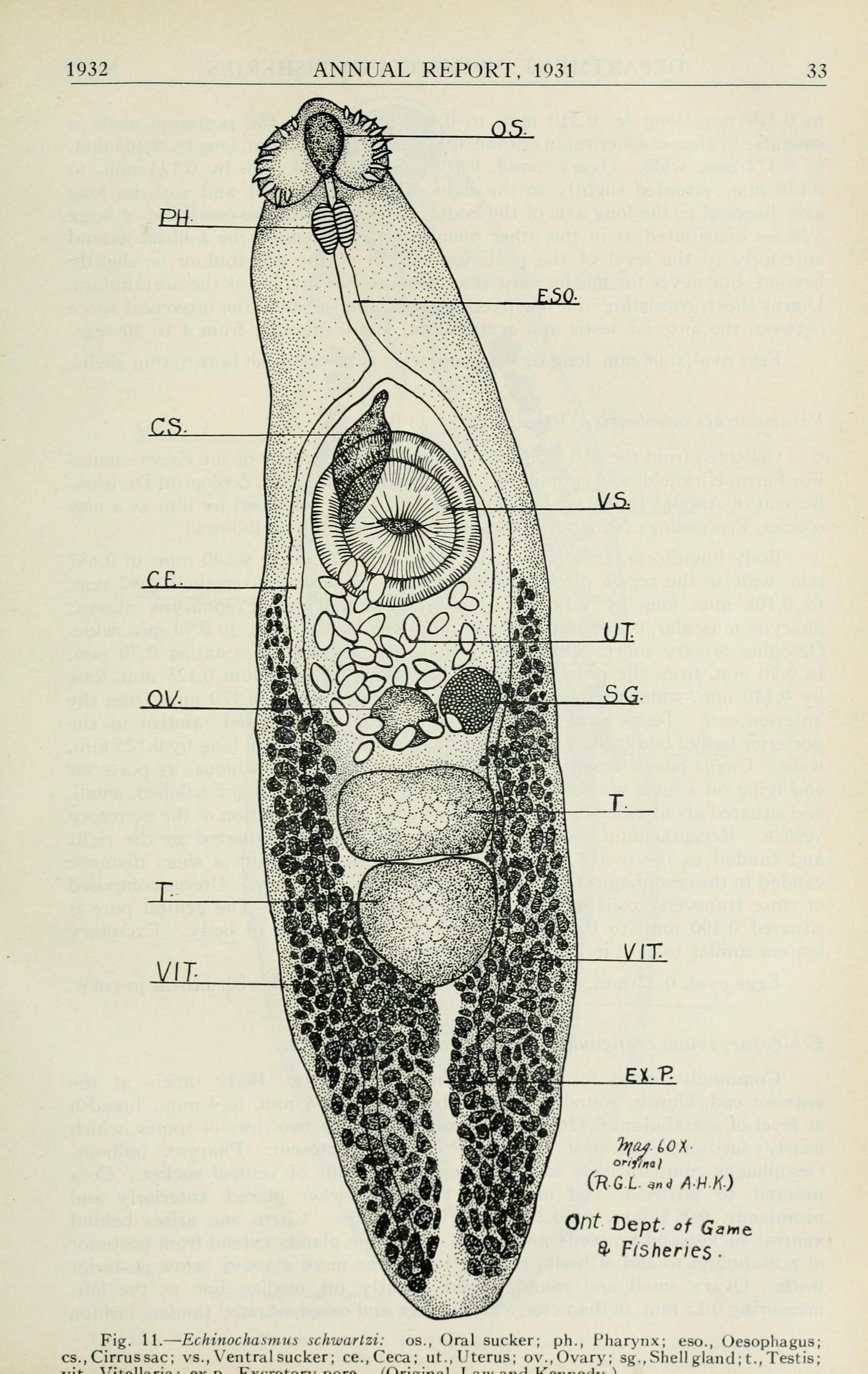

Scientific classification
- Kingdom: Animalia
- Phylum: Platyhelminthes
- Class: Trematoda
- Order: Plagiorchiida
- Family: Echinochasmidae
- Genus: Echinochasmus
- Species: E. schwartzi

Binomial name
- Echinochasmus schwartzi Price, 1931

= Echinochasmus schwartzi =

Species of fluke

Echinochasmus schwartzi is a fluke that infects dogs (Canis lupus familiaris), muskrats (Ondatra zibethicus), and marsh rice rats (Oryzomys palustris). It uses Fundulus fish as its intermediate host. Adults are similar to Echinochasmus microcaudatus, but differ in features of the oral sucker.

== Literature cited ==
- Ditrich, O., Scholz, T. and Vargas-Vázquez, J. 1996. Life-cycle of Echinochasmus macrocaudatus n. sp. (Trematoda: Echinostomatidae) (subscription required). Systematic Parasitology 33(3):225–235.
- Kinsella, J.M. 1988. Comparison of helminths of rice rats, Oryzomys palustris, from freshwater and saltwater marshes in Florida. Proceedings of the Helminthological Society of Washington 55(2):275–280.
