= Echinochasmus =

Scientific classification
- Kingdom: Animalia
- Phylum: Platyhelminthes
- Class: Trematoda
- Order: Plagiorchiida
- Family: Echinochasmidae
- Genus: Echinochasmus; Dietz, 1909

Genus of flukes

Echinochasmus is a genus of trematodes in the family Echinochasmidae.

== Species ==
- Echinochasmus cohensi Rao, 1951
- Echinochasmus dietzevi Issaitschikov, 1927
- Echinochasmus donaldsoni Beaver, 1941
- Echinochasmus mohiuddini Dharejo, Bilqees & Khan, 2007
- Echinochasmus mordax (Looss, 1899)
- Echinochasmus perfoliatus (Ratz, 1909)
- Echinochasmus skrjabini (Oshmarin, 1947)
- Echinochasmus schwartzi Price, 1931
