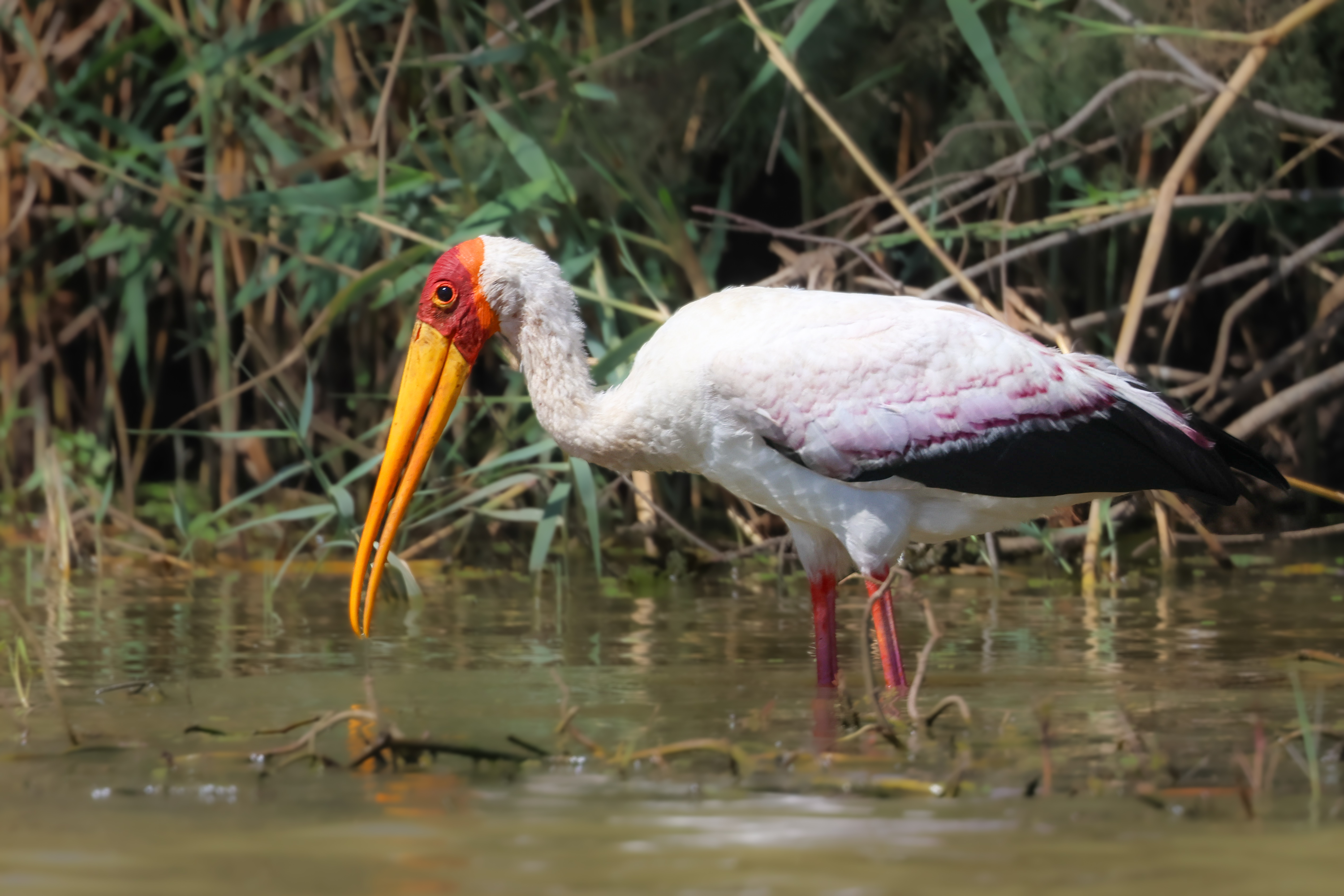
- Adult, Djoudj, Senegal
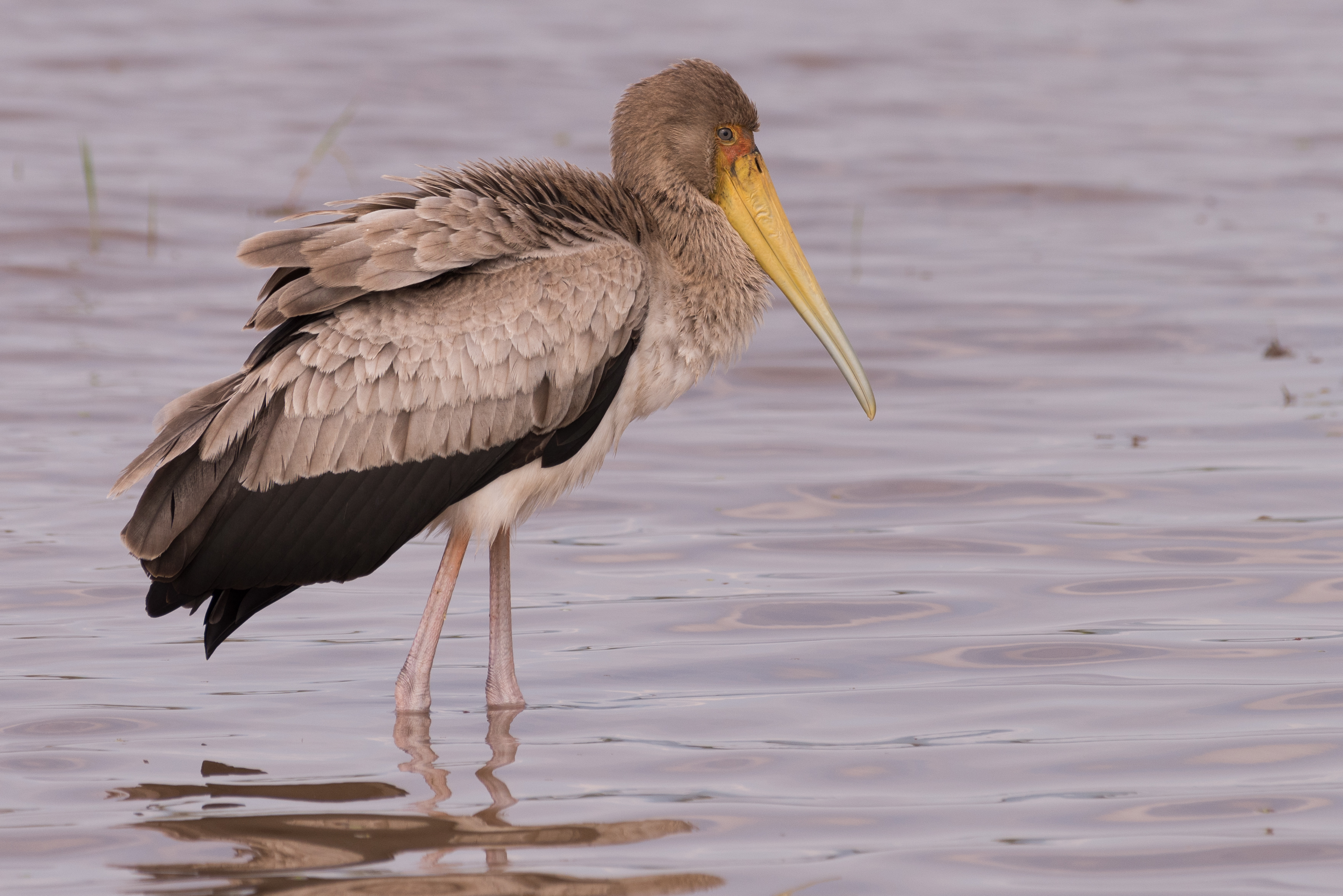
- Juvenile, Tanzania

Conservation status
- Least Concern (IUCN 3.1)

Scientific classification
- Kingdom: Animalia
- Phylum: Chordata
- Class: Aves
- Order: Ciconiiformes
- Family: Ciconiidae
- Genus: Mycteria
- Species: M. ibis

Binomial name
- Mycteria ibis (Linnaeus, 1766)

Synonyms
- Tantalus ibis Linnaeus, 1766

= Yellow-billed stork =

Species of bird

The yellow-billed stork (Mycteria ibis) is a large African stork species in the family Ciconiidae. It is widespread south of the Sahara and also occurs in Madagascar.

== Taxonomy and evolution ==
The yellow-billed stork lies within the genus Mycteria along with three other extant species: the wood stork (M. americana), the milky stork (M. cinerea) and the painted stork (M. leucocephala). Species within Mycteria display remarkable homologies in behavior (e.g., feeding and courtship) and morphology, with relatively few species-specific variations.

== Description ==
This medium-sized stork stands 90–105 cm (35–41 in) tall. Its body is white with a short black tail that is glossed green and purple when freshly moulted. The bill is deep yellow, slightly decurved at the end and with a rounder cross-section than in other stork species outside the Mycteria. Feathers extend onto the head and neck just behind the eyes, with the face and forehead being covered by deep red skin. Both sexes are similar in appearance, but the male is larger and has a slightly longer heavier bill. Males and females weigh approximately 2.3 kg (5.1 lb) and 1.9 kg (4.2 lb) respectively.

Colouration becomes more vivid during the breeding season. In the breeding season, the plumage is coloured pink on the upperwings and back; the ordinarily brown legs also turn bright pink; the bill becomes a deeper yellow and the face becomes a deeper red.

Juveniles are greyish-brown with a dull, partially bare orange face and a dull yellowish bill. The legs and feet are brown and feathers are blackish-brown all over. At fledging, salmon-pink colouration in the underwings begins to develop and after about one year, the plumage is greyish-white. Flight feathers on the tail and wing also become black. Later, the pink colouration typical of adult plumage appears.

These storks walk with a high-stepped stalking gait on the ground of shallow water. Their approximate walking rate has been recorded as 70 steps per minute. They fly with alternating flaps and glides, with the speed of their flaps averaging 177–205 beats per minute. They usually flap only for short journeys and often fly in a soaring and gliding motion over several kilometres for locomotion between breeding colonies or roosts and feeding sites. By soaring on thermals and gliding by turns, they can cover large distances without wasting much energy. On descending from high altitudes, this stork has been observed to dive deeply at high speeds and flip over and over from side to side, hence showing impressive aerobatics. It even appears to enjoy these aerial stunts.

This species is generally non-vocal, but will utter hissing falsetto screams during social displays in the breeding season. These storks also engage in bill clattering and an audible "woofing" wing beat at breeding colonies Nestlings make a loud continual monotonous braying call to beg parental adults for food.

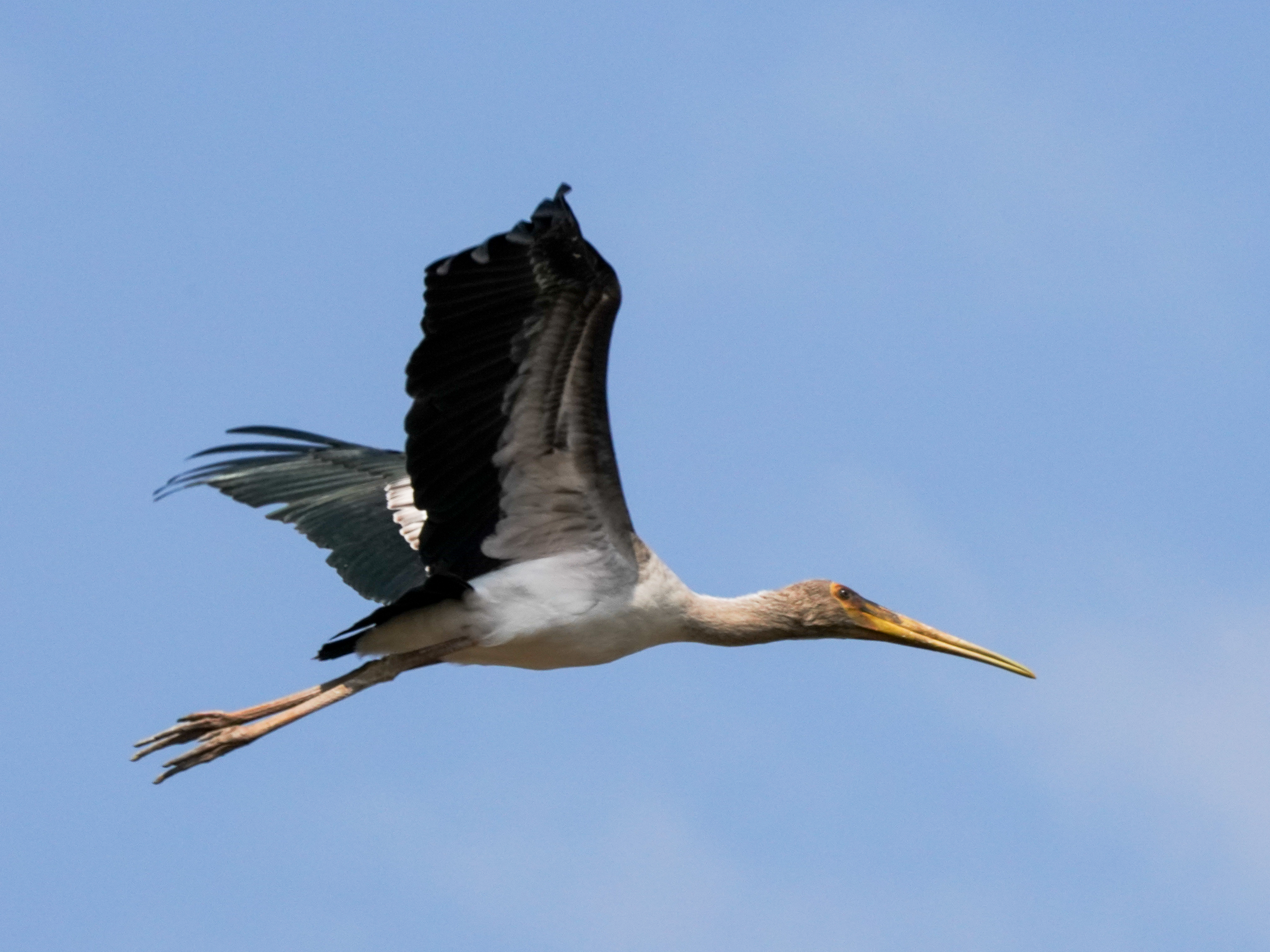
Juvenile, Zambia

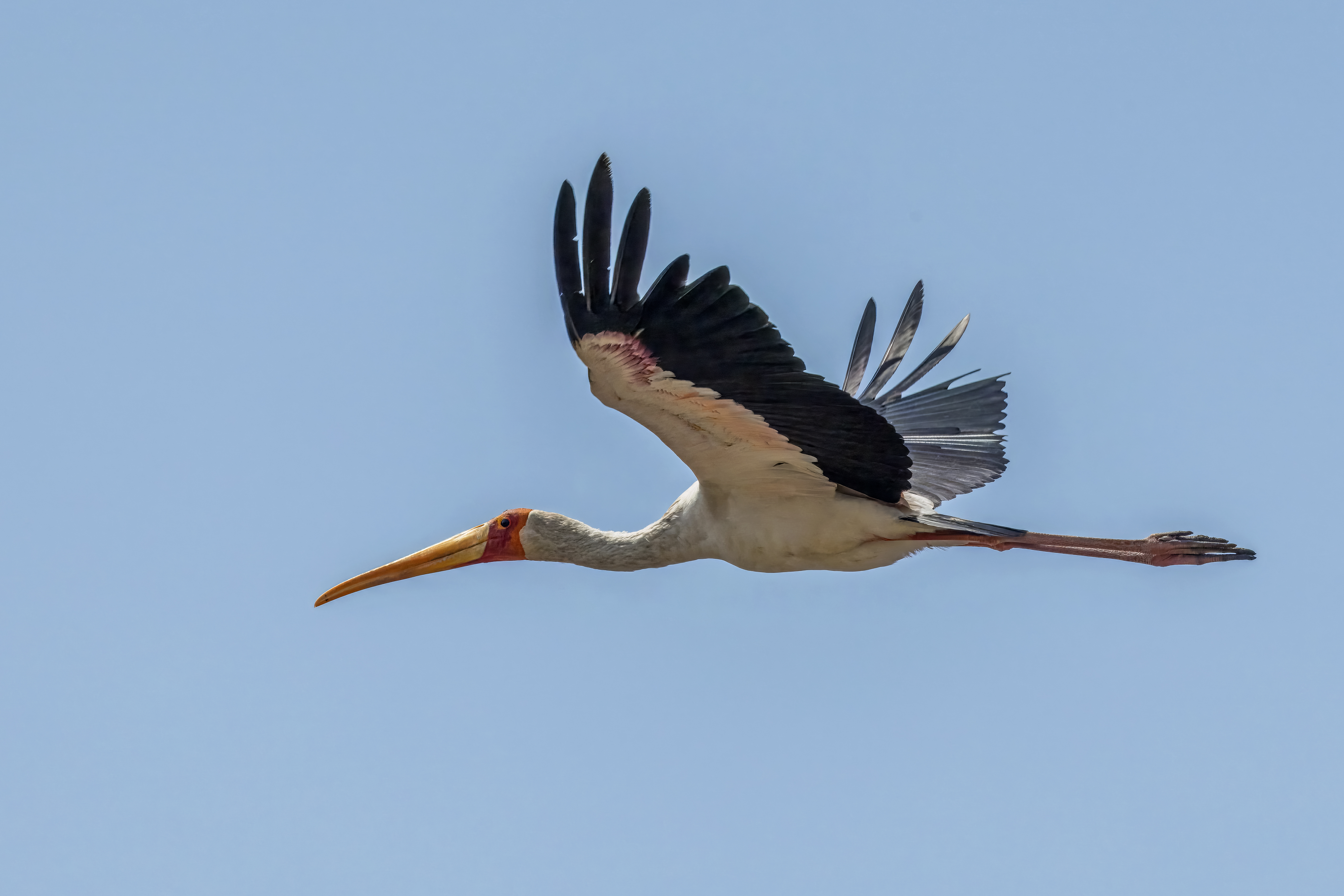
Adult, Tanzania

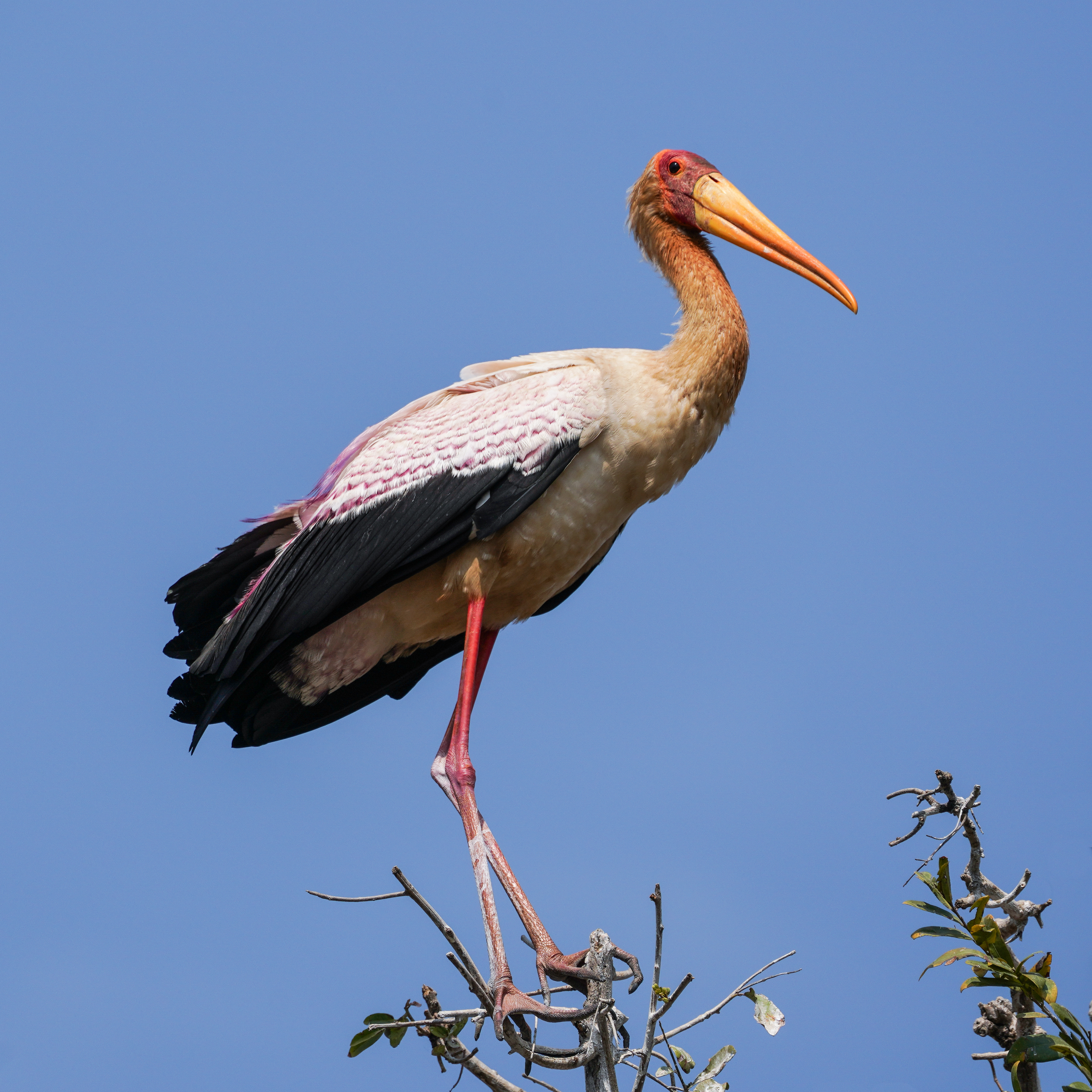
Vivid colours of breeding plumage

== Distribution and habitat ==
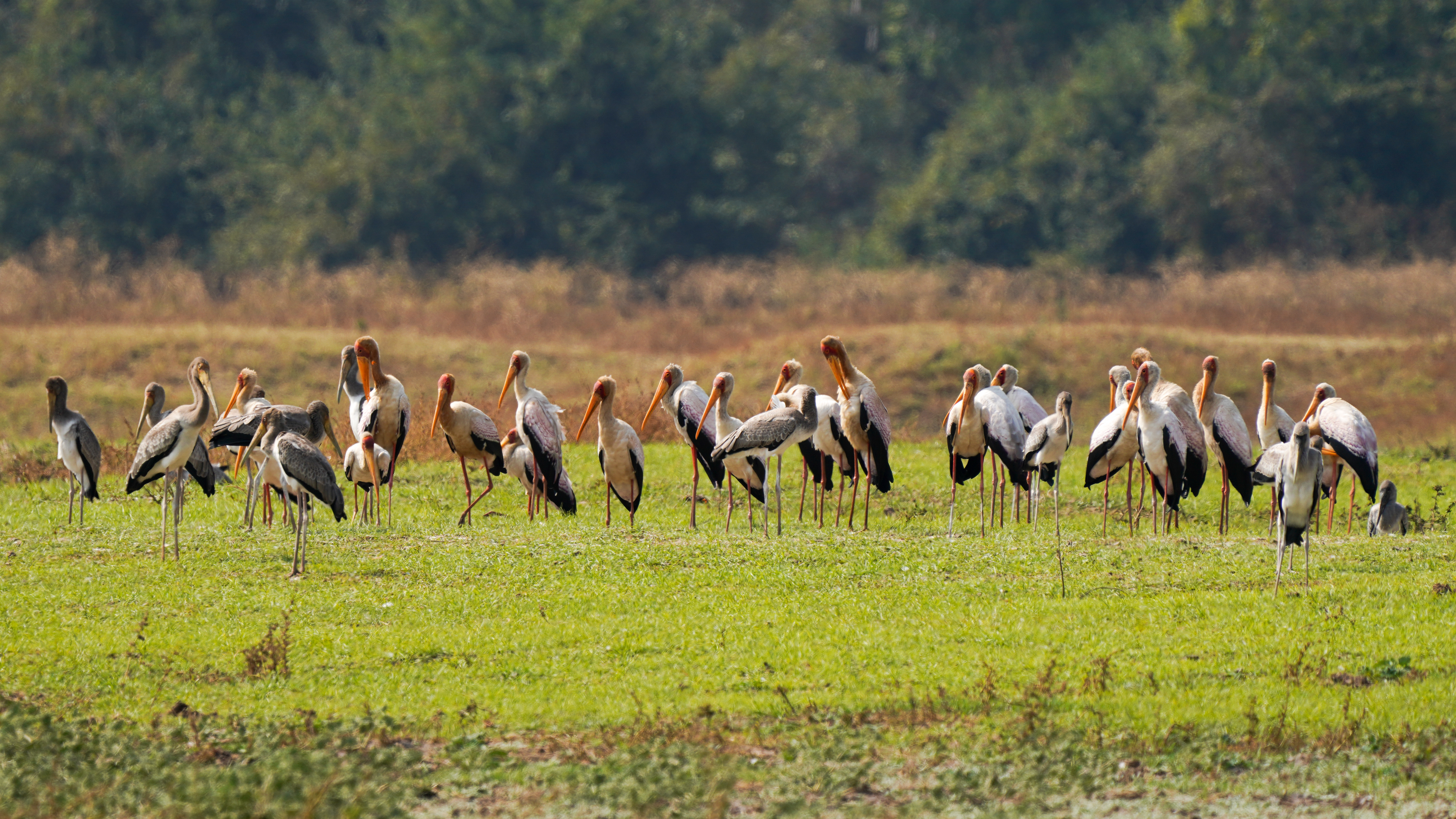
Flock in a seasonal wetland, Zambia

The yellow-billed stork occurs primarily in Eastern Africa, but is widely distributed in areas extending from Senegal and Somalia down to South Africa and in some regions of western Madagascar. During one observation of a mixed species bird colony on the Tana River in Kenya, it was found to be the commonest species there, with 2000 individuals being counted at once. It is also the dominant species in large breeding colonies at Lake Manyara and the Ihefu wetlands fringing the Ripera River in Tanzania.

The species does not generally migrate far, at least not outside its breeding range; but does usually make short migratory movements which are influenced by rainfall. It makes local movements in Kenya and has also been found to migrate from North to South Sudan with the rainy season. It may also migrate regularly to and from South Africa. However, little is actually known about this bird's general migratory movements. Due to apparent observed variation in migratory patterns throughout Africa, the yellow-billed stork has been termed a facultative nomad. It may migrate simply to avoid areas where water or rainfall conditions are unfavourable for feeding on prey. Some populations migrate considerable distances between feeding or breeding sites; usually by using thermals to soar and glide. Other local populations have been found to be sedentary and remain in their respective habitats all year round.

Preferred habitats include wetlands, shallow lakes and mudflats, usually 10–40 cm deep but it usually avoids heavily forested regions in central Africa. It also avoids flooded regions and deep expansive bodies of water because feeding conditions there are unsuitable for their typical grope and stir feeding techniques.

This species breeds especially in Kenya and Tanzania. Although it is known to breed in Uganda, breeding sites have not been recorded there. It has been found to breed also in Malakol in Sudan and often inside walled cities in West Africa from Gambia down to northern Nigeria. Still other breeding sites include Zululand in South Africa and northern Botswana, but are rarer below northern Botswana and Zimbabwe where sites are well-watered. Although there is no direct evidence of current breeding in Madagascar, young birds unable to fly have been observed near Lake Kinkony during October.

== Behaviour and ecology ==
=== Diet and feeding ===
This stork's diet mainly comprises small, freshwater fish of about 60-100mm length and maximally 150g, which they swallow whole. They also feed on crustaceans, worms, aquatic insects, frogs and occasionally small mammals and birds.

This species appears to rely principally on sense of touch to detect and capture prey, rather than by vision. They feed patiently by wading through the water with partially open bills, probing for prey at intervals. Contact of the bill with a prey item prompts a rapid snap-bill reflex, whereby the bird snaps shut its mandibles, raises its head and swallows the prey whole. The speed of this reflex in the closely related American woodstork (Mycteria americana) has been recorded as 25 milliseconds and although the corresponding reflex in the yellow-billed stork has not been quantitatively measured, the yellow-billed stork's feeding mechanism appears to be at least qualitatively identical to that of the American wood stork.

In addition to the snap-bill reflex, the yellow-billed stork also uses a systematic foot stirring technique to sound out evasive prey. It prods and churns up the bottom of the water as part of a "herding mechanism" to force prey out of the bottom vegetation and into the bird's bill. The bird does this several times with one foot before bringing it forwards and repeating with the other foot. Although they are normally active predators, they have also been observed to scavenge fish regurgitated by cormorants.

The yellow-billed stork has been observed to follow moving crocodiles or hippopotami through the water and feed behind them, appearing to take advantage of organisms churned up by their quarry. Feeding lasts for only a short time before the bird obtains its requirements and proceeds to rest again.

Parents feed their young by regurgitating fish onto the nest floor, whereupon it is picked up and consumed by the nestlings. The young eat voraciously and an individual nestling increases its body weight from 50 grams to 600 grams during the first ten days of its life. Hence, this species has earned the German colloquial common name "Nimmersatt"; meaning "never full".

=== Breeding ===
Breeding is seasonal and appears to be stimulated by the peak of long heavy rainfall and resultant flooding of shallow marshes, usually near Lake Victoria. This flooding is linked to an increase in prey fish availability; and reproduction is therefore synchronised with this peak in food availability. In such observations near Kisumu, M.P. Kahl's explanation for this trend was that in the dry season, most prey fish are forced to leave the dried-up, deoxygenated marshes that cannot support them and retreat to the deep waters of Lake Victoria where the storks cannot reach them. However, fish move back up the streams on the onset of rain and spread out over the marshes to breed, where they become accessible to the storks. By nesting at this time and providing that the rains do not end pre-maturely, the storks are guaranteed a plentiful food supply for their young.

The yellow-billed stork may also begin nesting and breeding at the end of long rains. This occurs especially on flat extensive marshlands as water levels gradually decrease and concentrate fish sufficiently for the storks to feed on. However, unseasonal rainfall has also been reported to induce off-season breeding in northern Botswana and western and eastern Kenya. Rainfall may cause local flooding and hence ideal feeding conditions. This stork appears to breed simply when rainfall and local flooding are optimal and hence seems to be flexible in its temporal breeding pattern, which varies with rainfall pattern throughout the African continent.

As with all stork species, male yellow-billed storks select and occupy potential nest sites in trees, whereupon females attempt to approach the males. The yellow-billed stork has an extensive repertoire of courtship behaviours near and at the nest that may lead to pair formation and copulation. Generally, these courtship behaviours are also assumed to be common to all Mycteria species and show remarkable homology within the genus Mycteria. After the male has initially established at the nesting-site and the female begins to approach, he displays behaviours that advertise himself to her. One of these is the Display Preening, whereby the male pretends to strip down each of his extended wings with the bill several times each side and the bill does not effectively close around the feathers. Another observed display among males is the Swaying-Twig Grasping. Here, the male stands on the potential nesting-site and bends over to gently grasp and release underlying twigs at regular intervals. This is sometimes accompanied by side-to-side oscillations of the neck and head and he continues to pick at twigs in between such movements.

Reciprocally, approaching females display their own distinct behaviours. One such behaviour is the Balancing Posture, whereby she walks with a horizontal body axis and extended wings toward the male occupying the nesting-site. Later, when the female continues to approach or already stands near an established male, she may also engage in Gaping. Here, the bill is gaped open slightly with the neck inclined upward at about 45° and often occurs in conjunction with the Balancing Posture. This behaviour ordinarily continues if the male accepts the female and has allowed her to enter the nest, but the female usually closes her wings by this time. The male may also continue his Display Preening when standing next to the female in the nest

During copulation, the male steps onto the female's back from the side, hooks his feet over her shoulders, holds out his wings for balance and finally bends his legs to lower himself for cloacal contact, as happens in most birds. In turn, the female holds out her wings almost horizontally. The process is accompanied by bill clattering from the male as he regularly opens and closes his mandibles and vigorously shakes his head to beat his bill against the female's. In turn, the female keeps her bill horizontal with the male's, or inclined downward at approximately 45 degrees. Average copulation time in this species has been calculated as 15.7 seconds.

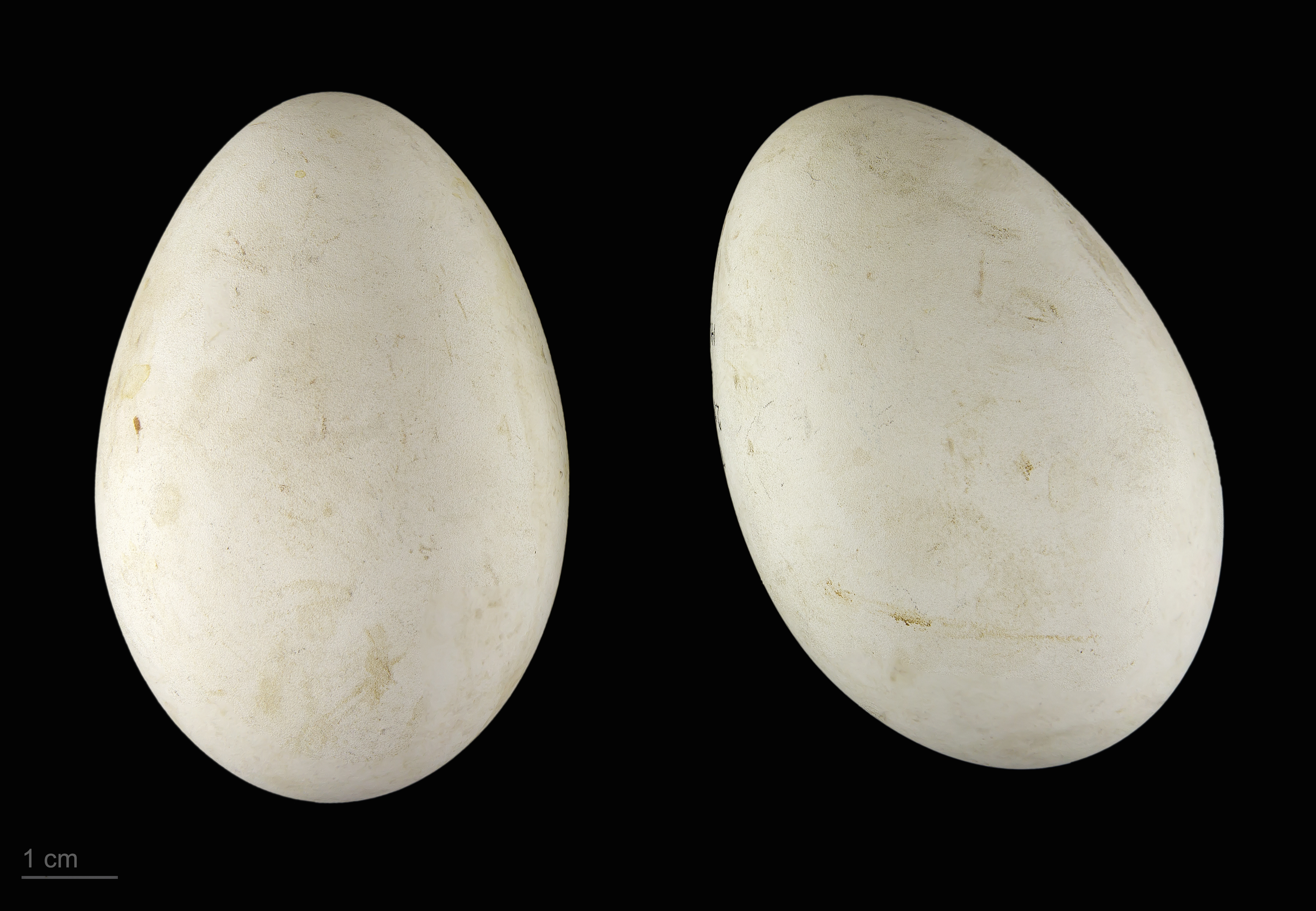
Mycteria ibis eggs MHNT

The female typically lays 2-4 eggs (usually 3) on alternate days and average clutch size has been recorded as 2.5. The male and female share duties to incubate the eggs, which takes up to 30 days. As in many other stork species, hatching is asynchronous (usually at 1- to 2-day intervals), so that the young in the brood differ considerably in body size at any one time. During food shortage, the smaller young are at risk of being outcompeted for food by their larger nest-mates.

Both parents share duties of guarding and feeding the young until the latter are about 21 days old. Thereafter, both parents forage to attend to the young's intense food demands. Alongside parental feeding by regurgitation of fish, parents have also been observed to regurgitate water into the open bills of their nestlings, especially on hot days. This may aid the typical thermoregulatory strategy of the young (common to all stork species) to excrete dilute urine down their legs in response to hot weather. Water regurgitated over the young serves as a water supplement in addition to fluid in their food, so that they have sufficient water to continue urinating down their legs to avoid hyperventilation. Additionally, parents sometimes help keep the young cool by shading them with their open wings.

The nestlings usually fledge after 50–55 days of hatching and fly away from the nest. However, after leaving the nest for the first time, the offspring often return there to be fed by their parents and roost with them for another 1–3 weeks. It is also thought that individuals are not fully adult until 3 years old and despite lack of data, new adults are thought to not breed until much later than this.

Fledglings have also been observed to not differ considerably in their foraging and feeding strategies from adults. In one investigation, four adult, hand-reared yellow-billed storks kept in captivity showed typical grope-feeding and foot stirring shortly after they were introduced to bodies of water. Hence, this suggests that such feeding techniques in this species are innate.

=== Nesting ===
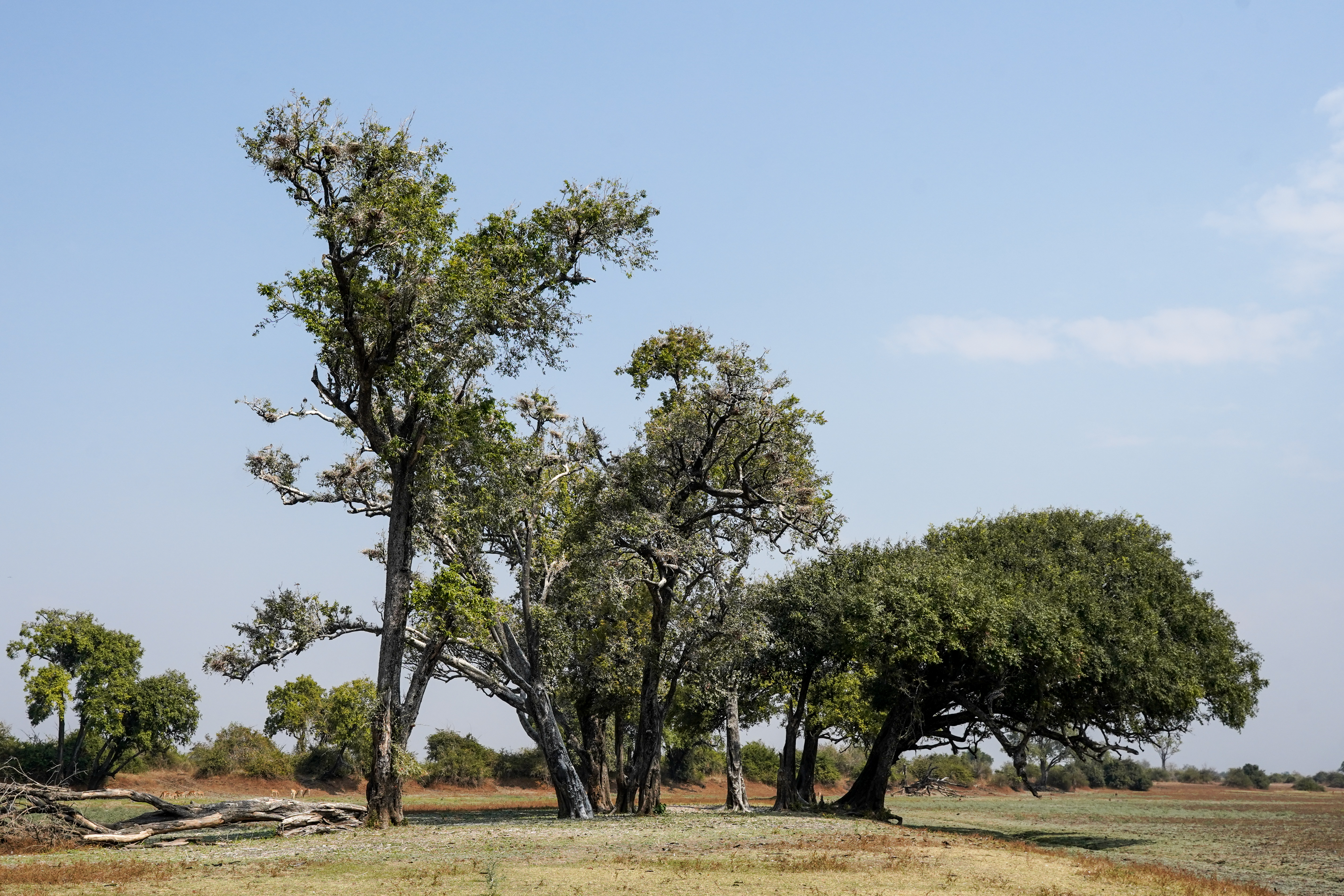
Colony of nests in tall trees, Zambia

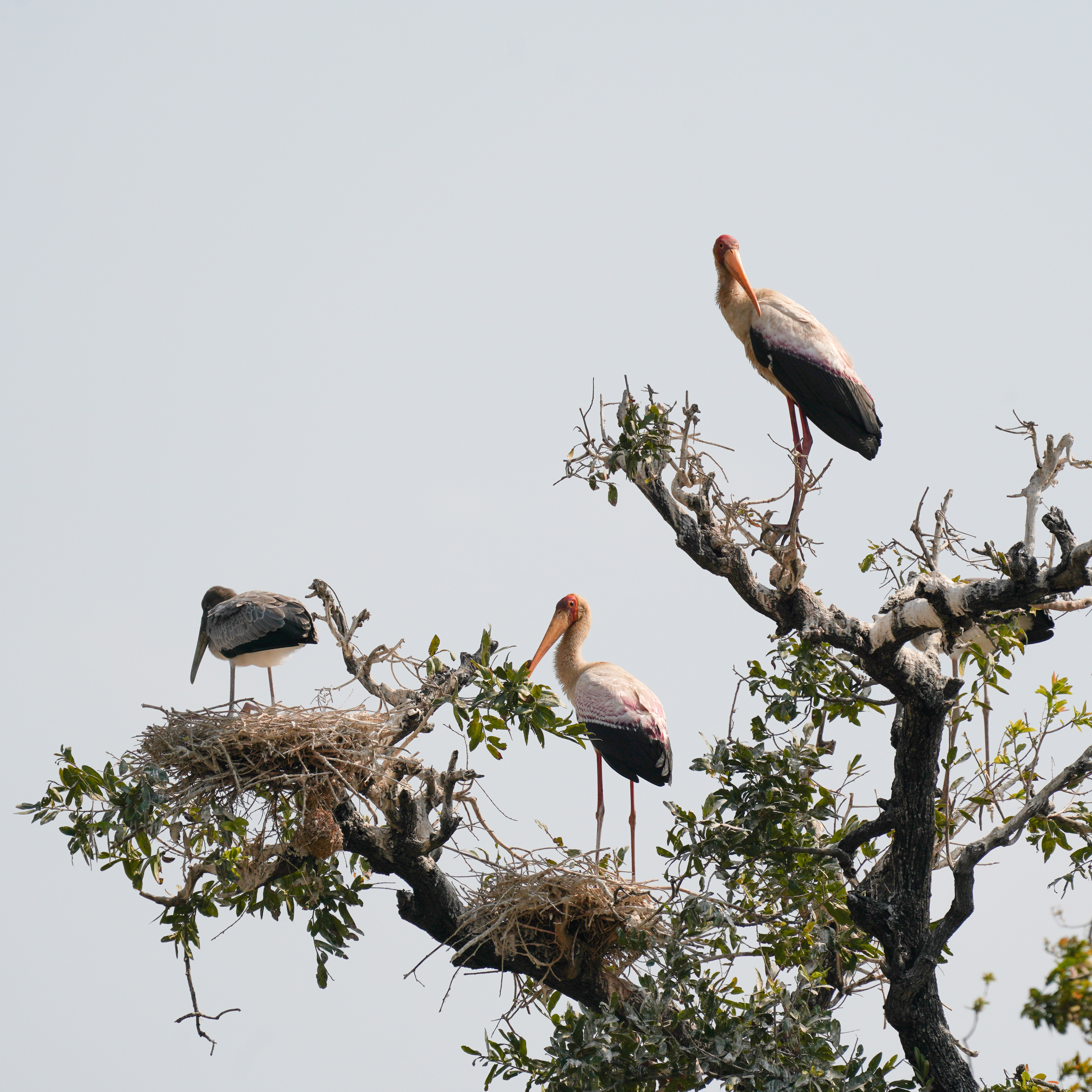
Stick nests on a tall tree, Zambia

The yellow-billed ibis is a colonial nester, often alongside other species; but the yellow-billed stork is sometimes the only occupant species of a nesting site. Colonies are usually 10-20 nests in size, with several males occupying potential nest sites all in the same place. If many of these males do not acquire mates, the whole group moves on with the unpaired females to another tree. These "bachelor parties" are a noticeable feature of colonies of this species and usually consist of 12 or more males and at least as many females. As many as 50 nests have been counted all at once in a single breeding area.

The male and female together build the nest of sticks either in high trees on dry land away from predators, or in small trees over water. Nest building takes up to 10 days. The nest may be 80–100 cm (31–39 in) in diameter and 20–30 cm (7.9–11.8 in) thick.

=== Other behaviours ===
Despite their gregariousness during breeding, most individuals generally ignore each other outside nesting-sites; although some hostile encounters may occur. Some of these encounters involve one individual showing an unambiguous attack or escape response if there is a large difference in social status between the two individuals. However, if two individuals are equally matched, they slowly approach each other and show a ritualised display called the Forward Threat. Here, one individual holds its body forward horizontally and retracts the neck so that it touches the crown, with the tail cocked at 45 degrees and all feathers erect. It approaches the opponent and points its bill at it, sometimes gaping. If the opponent does not capitulate, the attacker may grab at it with its bill and the two may briefly spar with their bills until one retreats in an erect stance with compressed plumage.

Hostility can also arise between opposite sexes when a female approaches a male on a potential nest site. Both sexes may display a similar aforementioned Forward Threat, but clatter their bills after grabbing with them at the other stork and extend their wings to maintain balance. Another hostile behaviour between sexes is the Snap Display, whereby they snap horizontally with their bills while standing upright. This may occur during and immediately after pair formation, but subsides later in the breeding cycle as the male and female become familiar with each other and it eventually disappears.

Nestlings show remarkable behavioural transformations at 3 weeks of age. During the constant parental attendance before this time, the young show little fear or aggression in response to intruders (such as a human observer), but are found to merely crouch low and quietly in the nest. After this time, when both parents go foraging and leave the young in the nest, a nestling shows strong fear in response to an intruder. It either attempts to climb out of the nest to escape or acts aggressively toward the intruder.

== Threats and survival ==
As well as being abundant and widespread, the yellow-billed stork also appears tolerant of short-term natural habitat changes. However, in East Africa, it is known to be at risk from poaching and habitat reduction despite abundance and population stability and is listed under the African-Eurasian Waterbird Agreement (AEWA). Nevertheless, the overall population is not currently considered to be threatened with serious decline, especially since breeding success is relatively high. In East Africa where it is most abundant, broods of 1-3 per nest have been recorded.

Alongside human activities, natural enemies include cheetahs, leopards and lions, which all sometimes prey on this species. Eggs may be also at risk of predation by African fish eagles. At one colony in Kisumu, Kenya, approximately 61% of eggs counted between all nests hatched and 38% were predated by fish eagles. The success rate of fledglings was only 0.33 young per nest. However, increased egg predation by fish eagles has been reported to be linked to decline in fish stocks in the Winam Gulf.

== In culture or relationships to humans ==
The yellow-billed stork has appeared on postage stamps in several African countries.

== Status ==
This species is evaluated as Least Concern for several reasons. First, population trend appears to be decreasing but this decrease is not believed to rapidly approach thresholds for Vulnerable under the population trend criterion. Its range is also very large and does not approach threshold for Vulnerable under range size criterion. Finally, although there have been no official population size estimates, the population is known to be very large and so does not approach thresholds for Vulnerable under population size criterion.

== Gallery ==
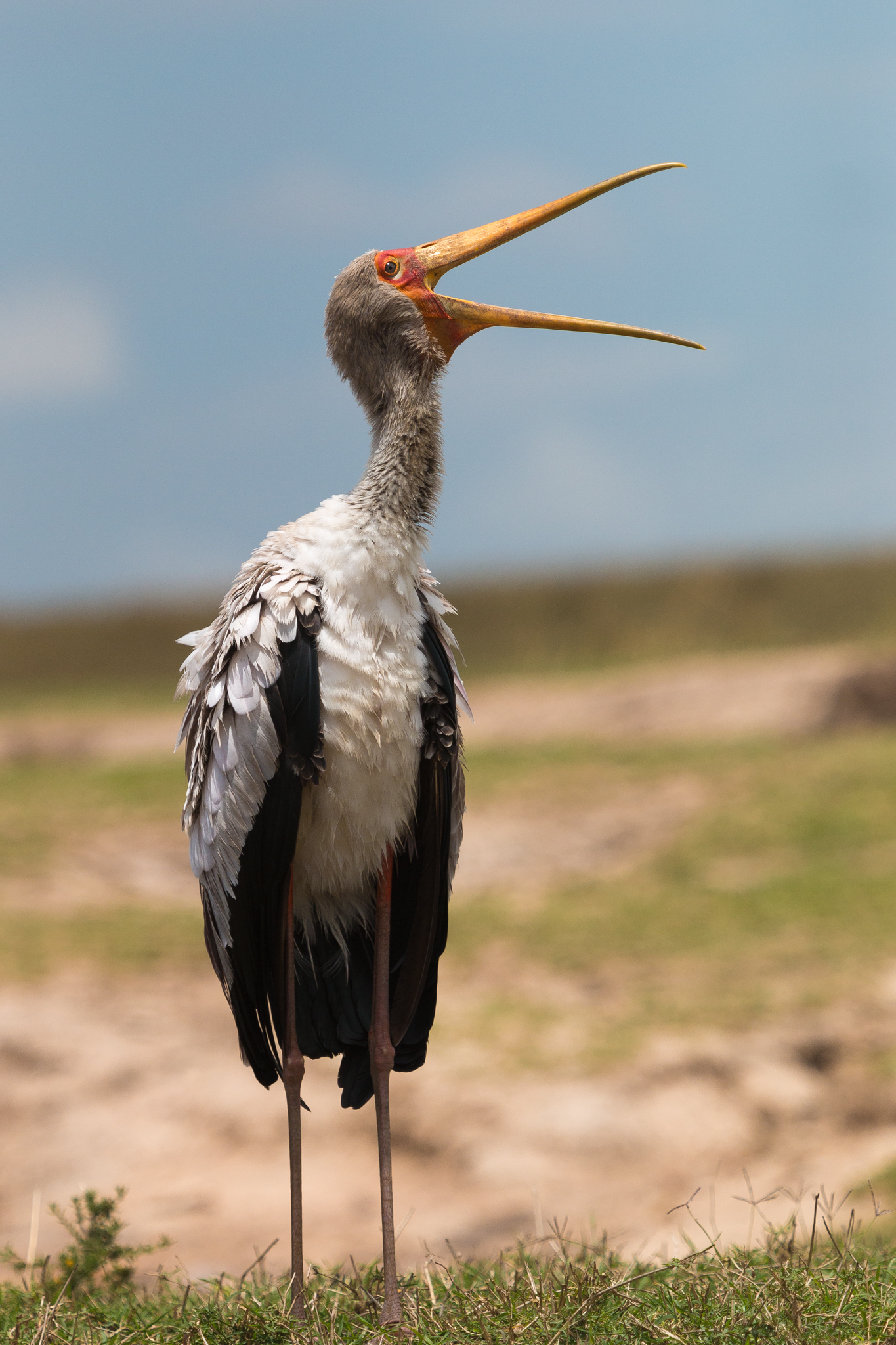
Immature at Maasai Mara National Reserve

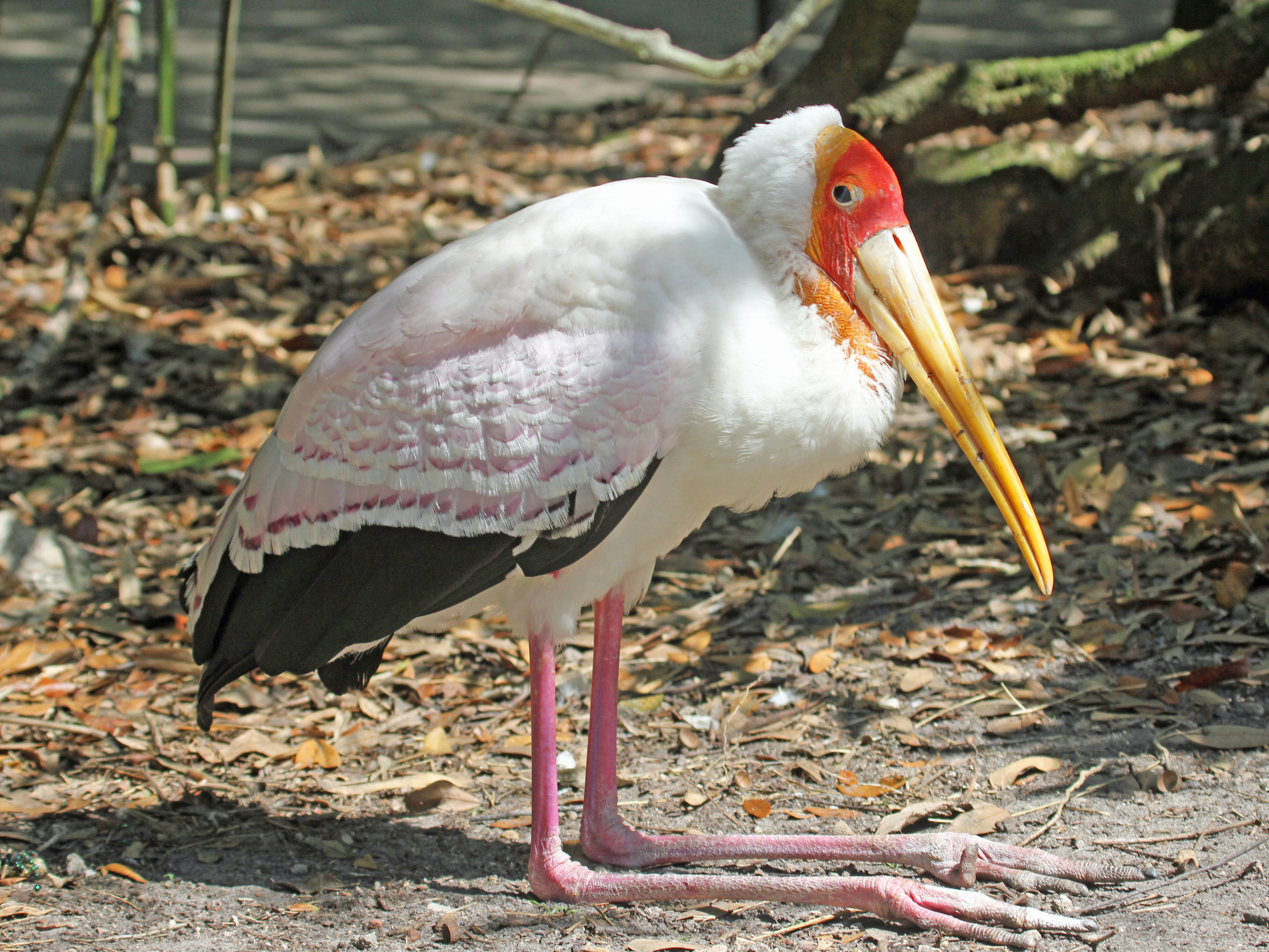
Storks sometimes rest on their hocks (analogous to a human's heels)

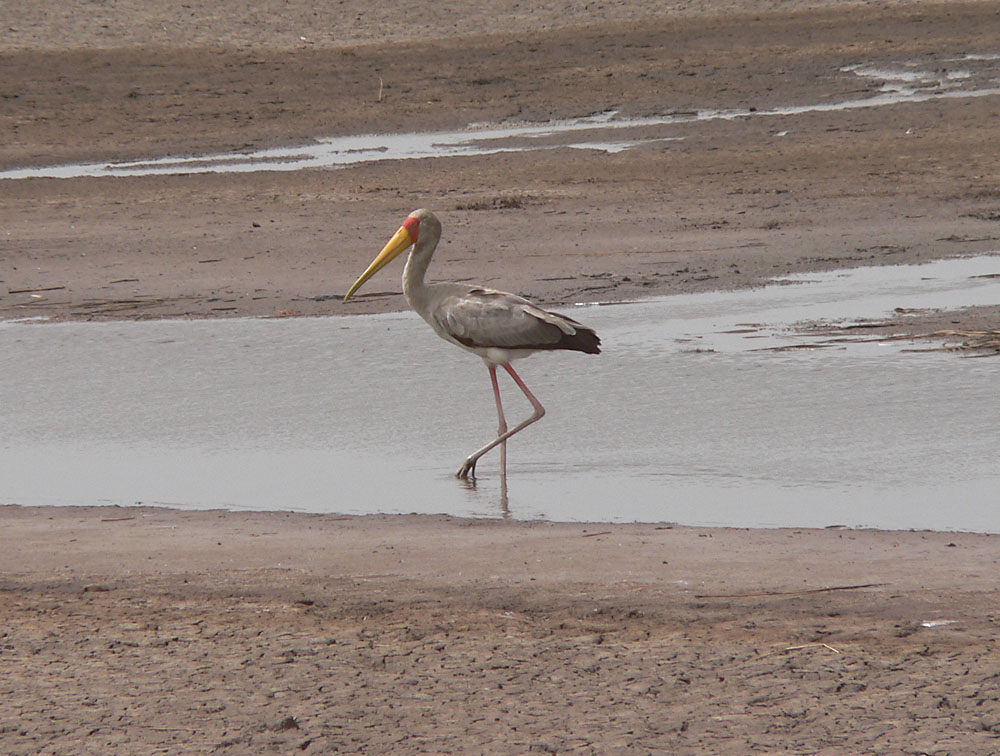
Juveniles have grey backs, mature birds have white backs

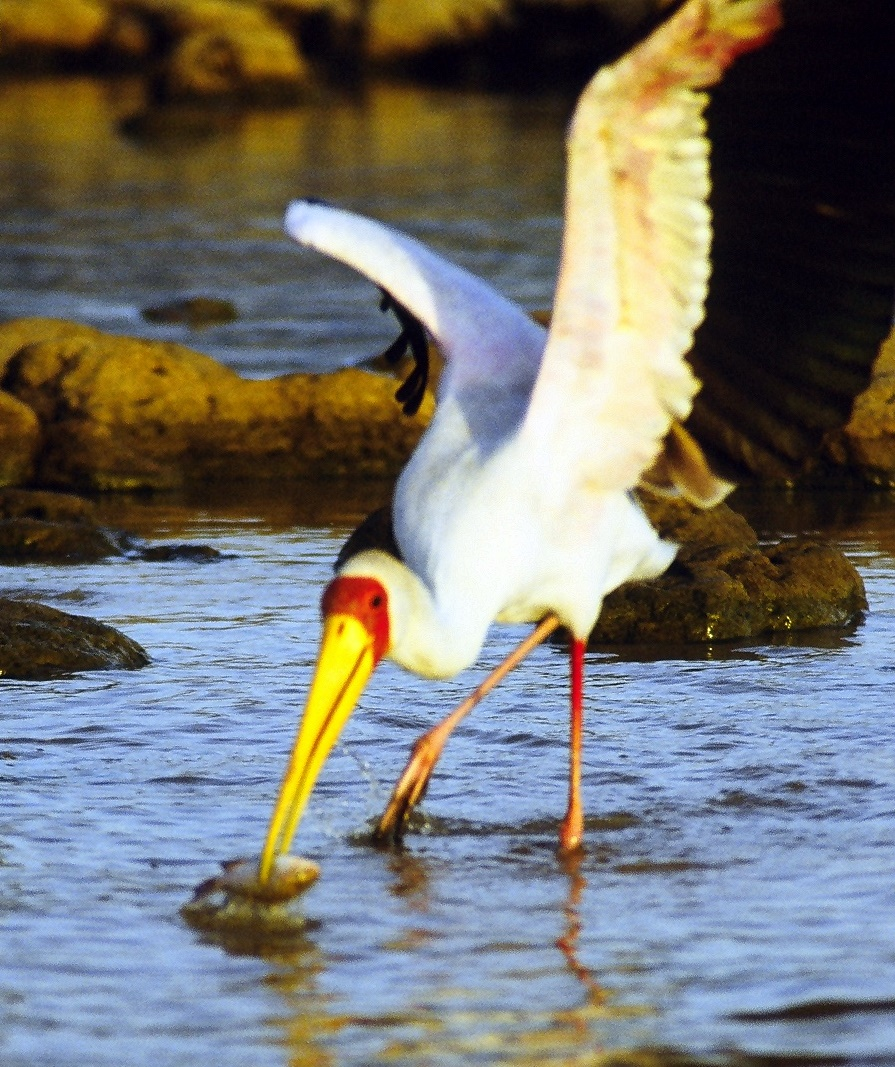
Fishing in shallow water

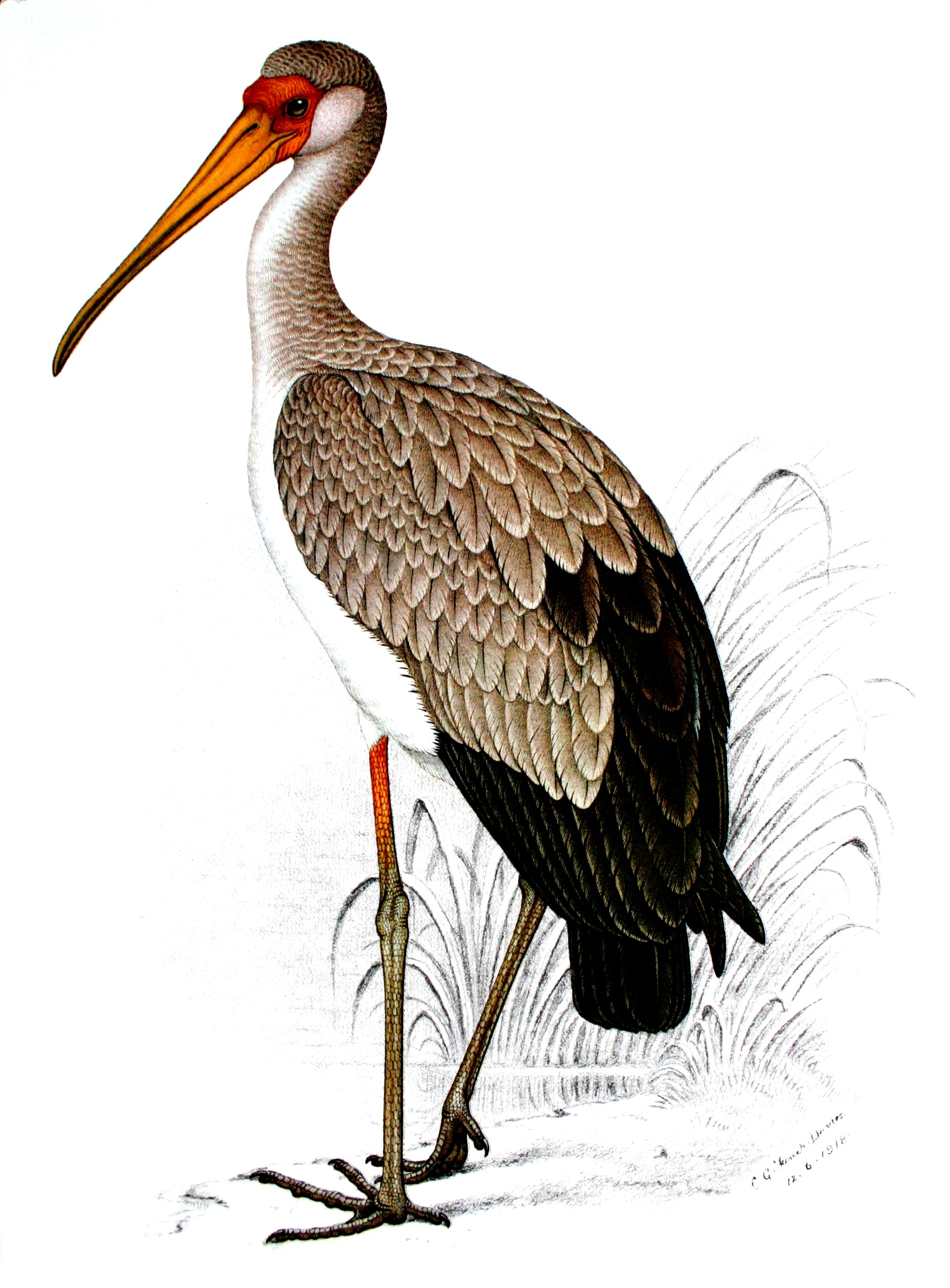
Juvenile

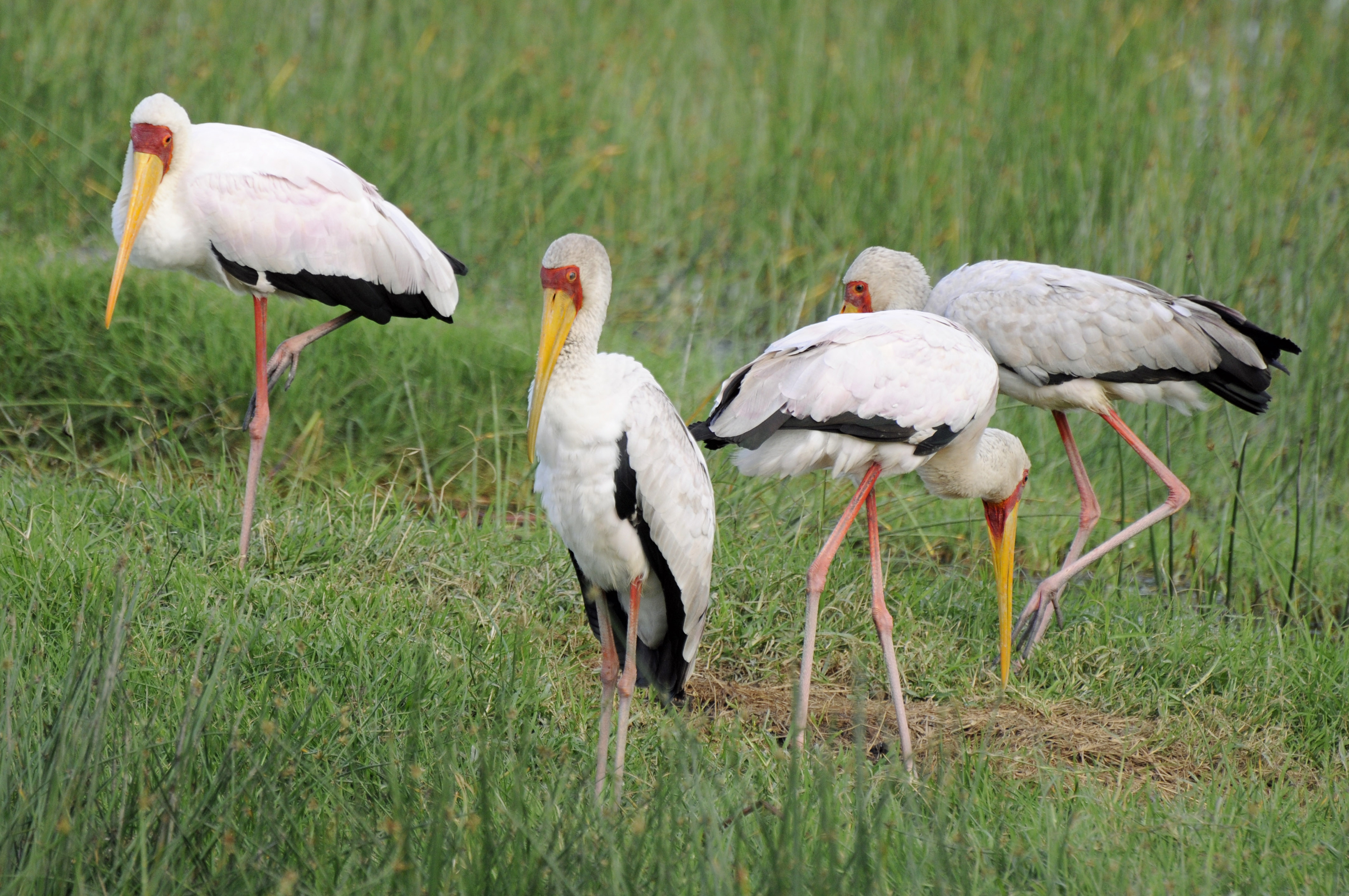
Flock at Lake Nakuru National Park, Kenya

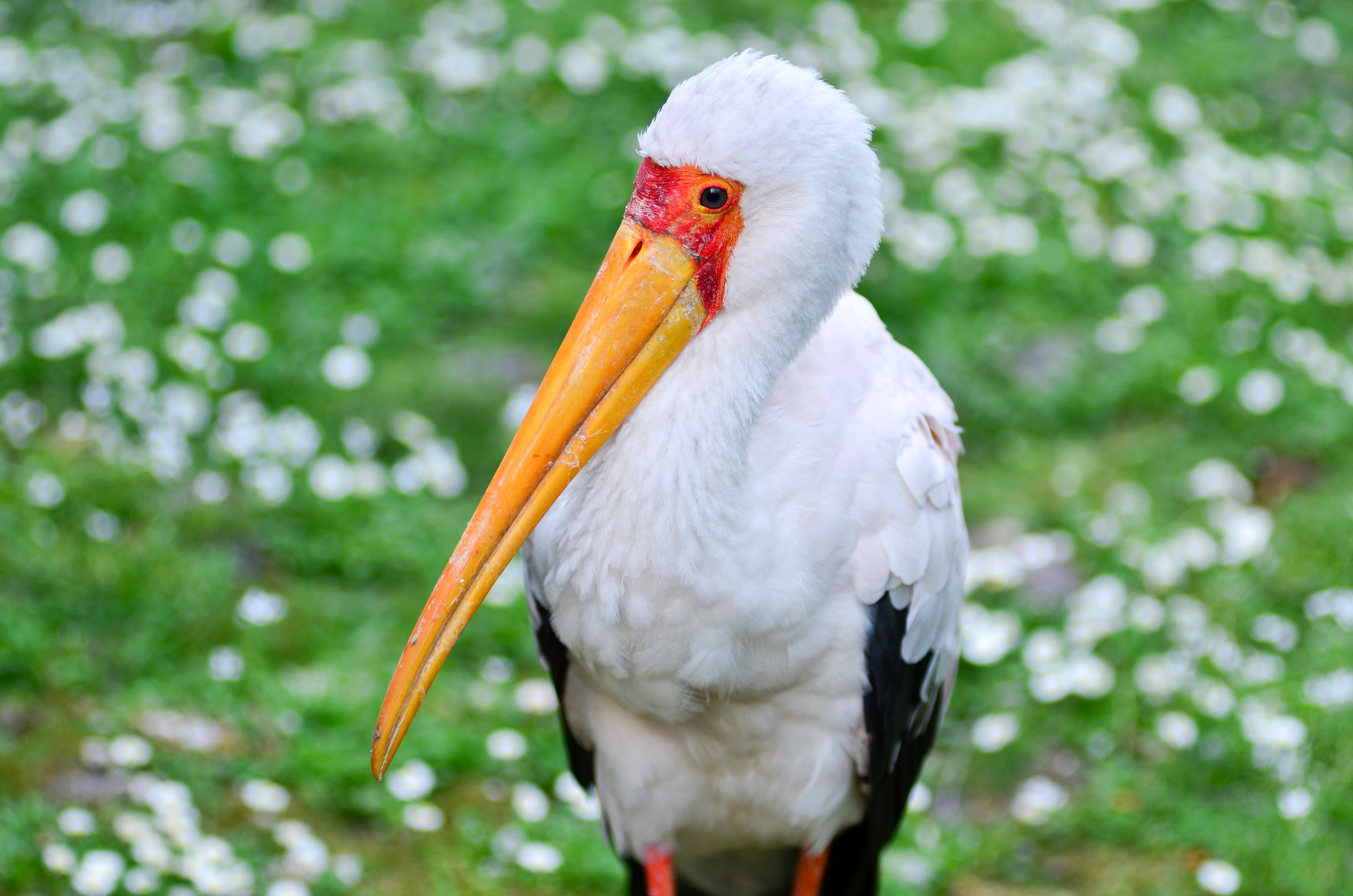
Weltvogelpark Walsrode, Germany

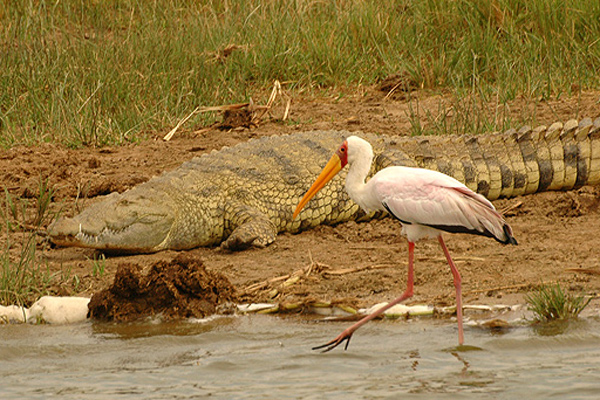
With a Nile crocodile at Kazinga Channel, Uganda

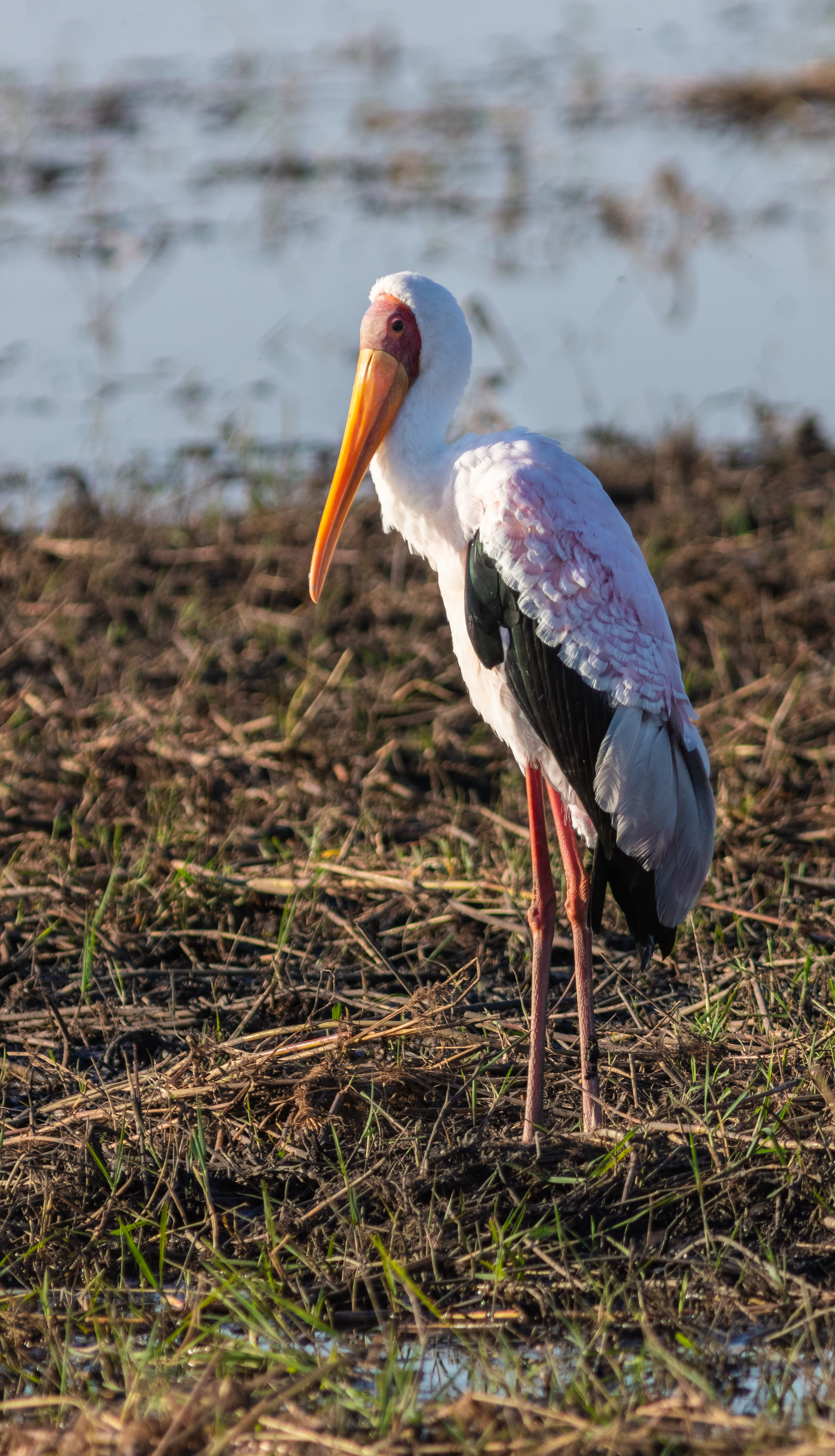
Chobe National Park, Botswana

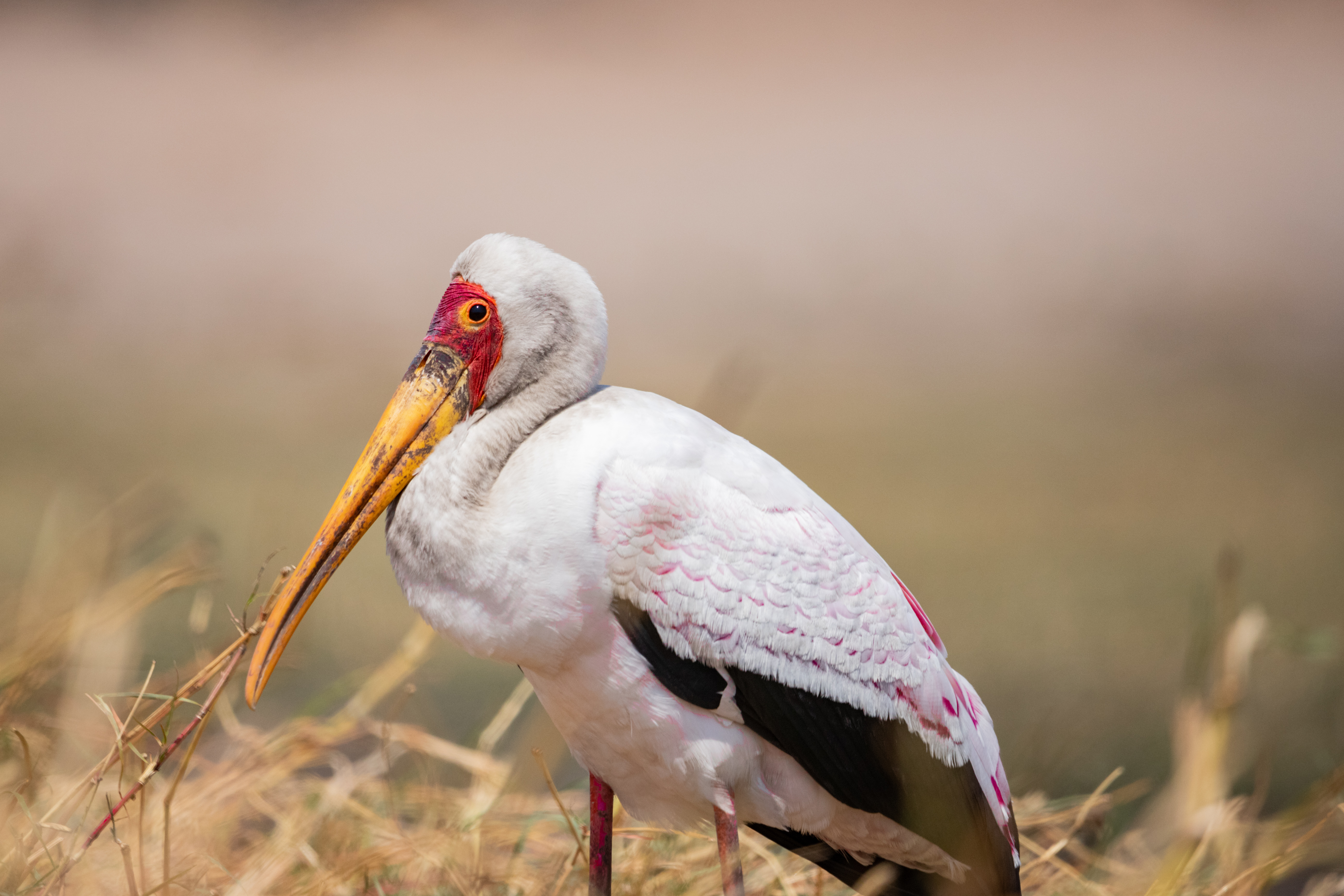
On the bank of a river

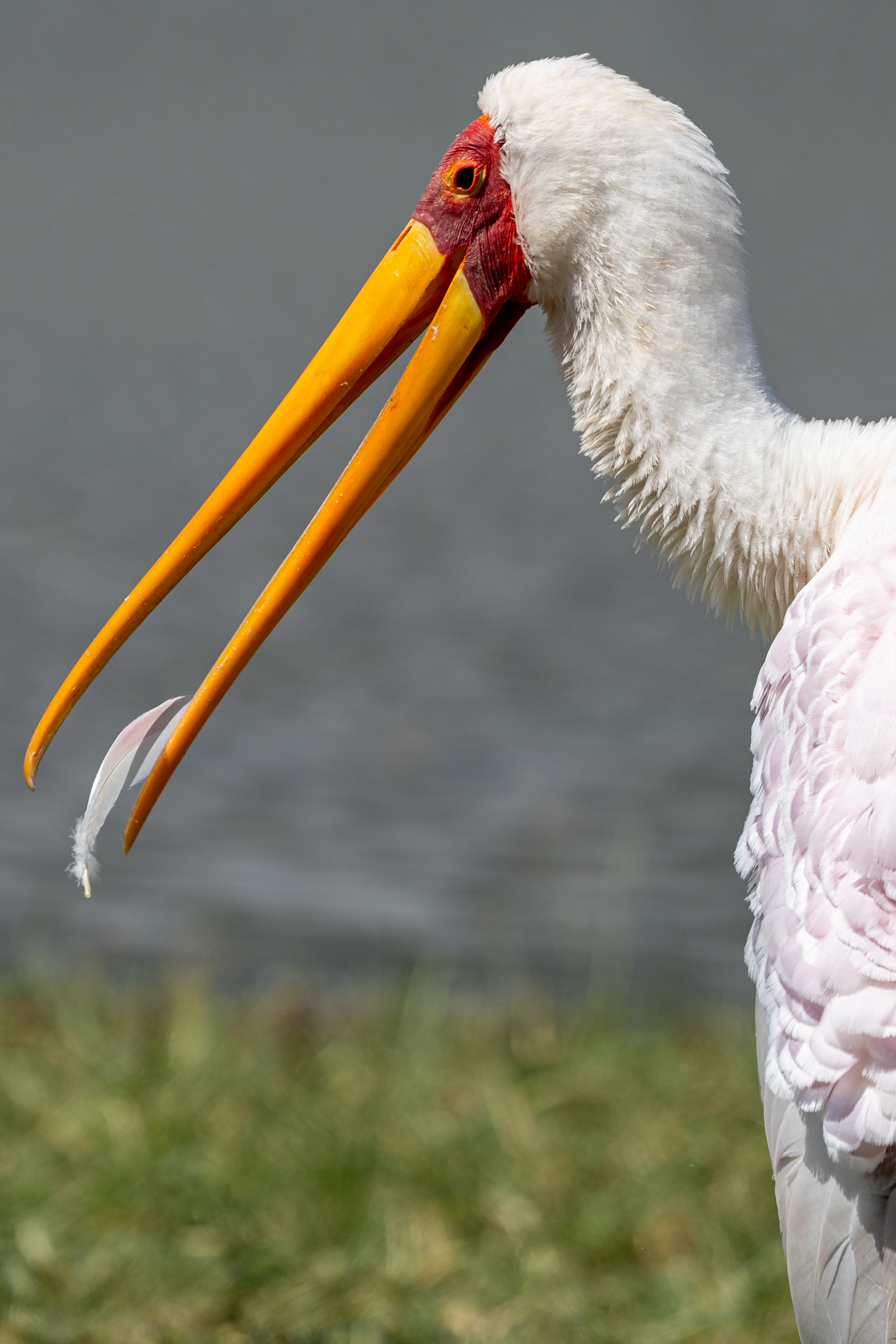
Ngorongoro, Tanzania

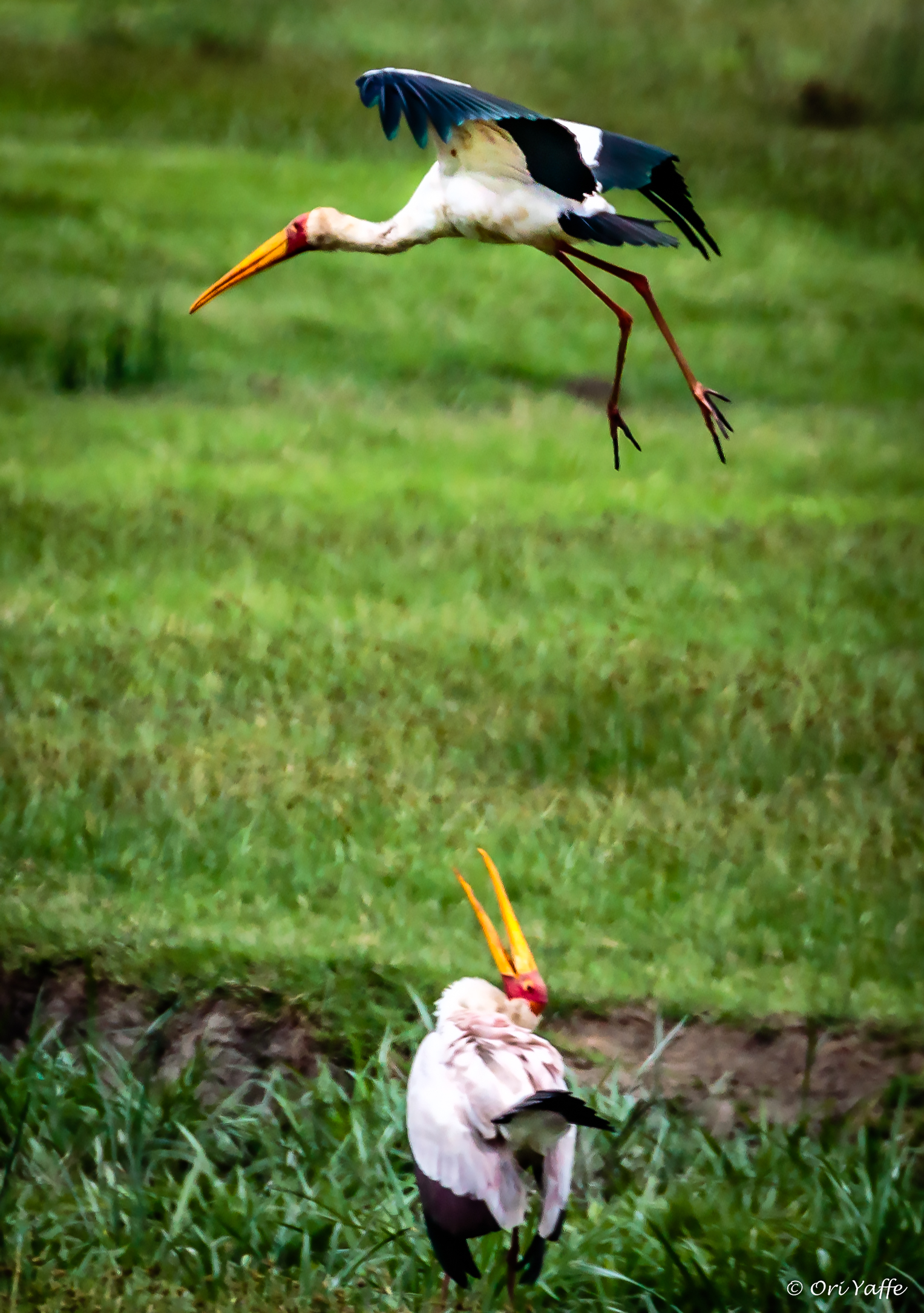
Yellow-Billed stork

== Sources ==
- Bannerman, D.A. (1953). The birds of west and equatorial Africa, Vol. 1. Oliver & Boyd: London.
- Bell-Cross, G. (1974). "Observations on fish-eating birds in central Africa". Honeyguide, 77: 23–31.
- Brown, L.H., and Britton, P.L. (1980). The Breeding Seasons of East African Birds. East African Natural History Society: London.
- Brown, L.H., Urban, E.K., and Newman, K. (1982). The Birds of Africa, Vol. 1. Academic Press: London.
- Clancey, P.A. (1964). The Birds of Natal and Zuzuland. Oliver & Boyd: London.
- Fraser, W. (1971). "Breeding herons and storks in Botswana". Ostrich, 42: 123–127.
- Garrod, A.H. (1875a). On the form of trachea in certain species of storks and spoonbills. Proceedings of the Zoological Society of London, 1875: 297–301.
- Garrod, A.H. (1875b). On the disposition of the deep planar tendons in different birds. Proceedings of the Zoological Society of London, 1875: 339–348.
- James, Peter L. (1931). Checklist of the Birds of the World, Vol 1. Harvard University Press: Cambridge, USA.
- Kahl, M.P. (1972). "Comparative ethology of the Ciconiidae: The wood storks (Genera Mycteria and Ibis)". Ibis, 114: 15-29
- Kahl, M.P. (1964). "Food Ecology of the Wood stork (Mycteria americana) in Florida". Ecological Monographs, 34: 97-117.
- Kahl, M.P. (1968). "Recent breeding records of storks in Eastern Africa". Journal of East African Natural History Society and National Museum, 27: 67–72.
- Kahl, M.P., and Peacock, L.J. (1963). "The bill-snap reflex: a feeding mechanism in the American woodstork". Nature, 199: 505–506.
- Hancock, J.A., Kushlan, J.A., and Kahl, M.P. (1992). Storks, Ibises and Spoonbills of the World. Academic Press: London.
- Kasoma, P.M.B., and Pomeroy, D.E. (1987). "The status and ecology of storks and the shoebill in East Africa". Colonial Waterbirds, 10: 221–228.
- Langrand, O. (1990). Guide to the birds of Madagascar. Yale University Press: New Haven.
- Parsons, J. (1977). "The effect of predation by fish eagles on the breeding success of various Ciconiiformes nesting near Kisumu, Kenya". Journal of Natural History, 11: 337–353.
- Pooley, A.C. (1967). "Bird/crocodile and bird/hippopotamus commensalism in Zuzuland". Ostrich, 38: 11–12.
- Rand, A.L. (1936). The distribution and habits of Madagascar birds. Bulletin of the American Museum of Natural History, 72: 143–499.
- Schüz, E. (1957). "Das Verschlingen eigener Junger ( "Kronismus") bei Vogeln und seine Bedeutung". Vogelwarte, 19: 1-15.
- Sinclair, I., Hockey, P.A.R., and Arlott, N. (2007). The larger illustrated Guide to the Birds of Southern Africa. Struik Publishers: Cape Town.
- Stronach, B.W.H. (1968). "The Chagana heronry in western Tanzania". Ibis, 110: 344–348.
- Tree, A.J. (1978). "A visit to Makgadikgadi Pan in April 1974". Honeyguide, 109: 18–19.
