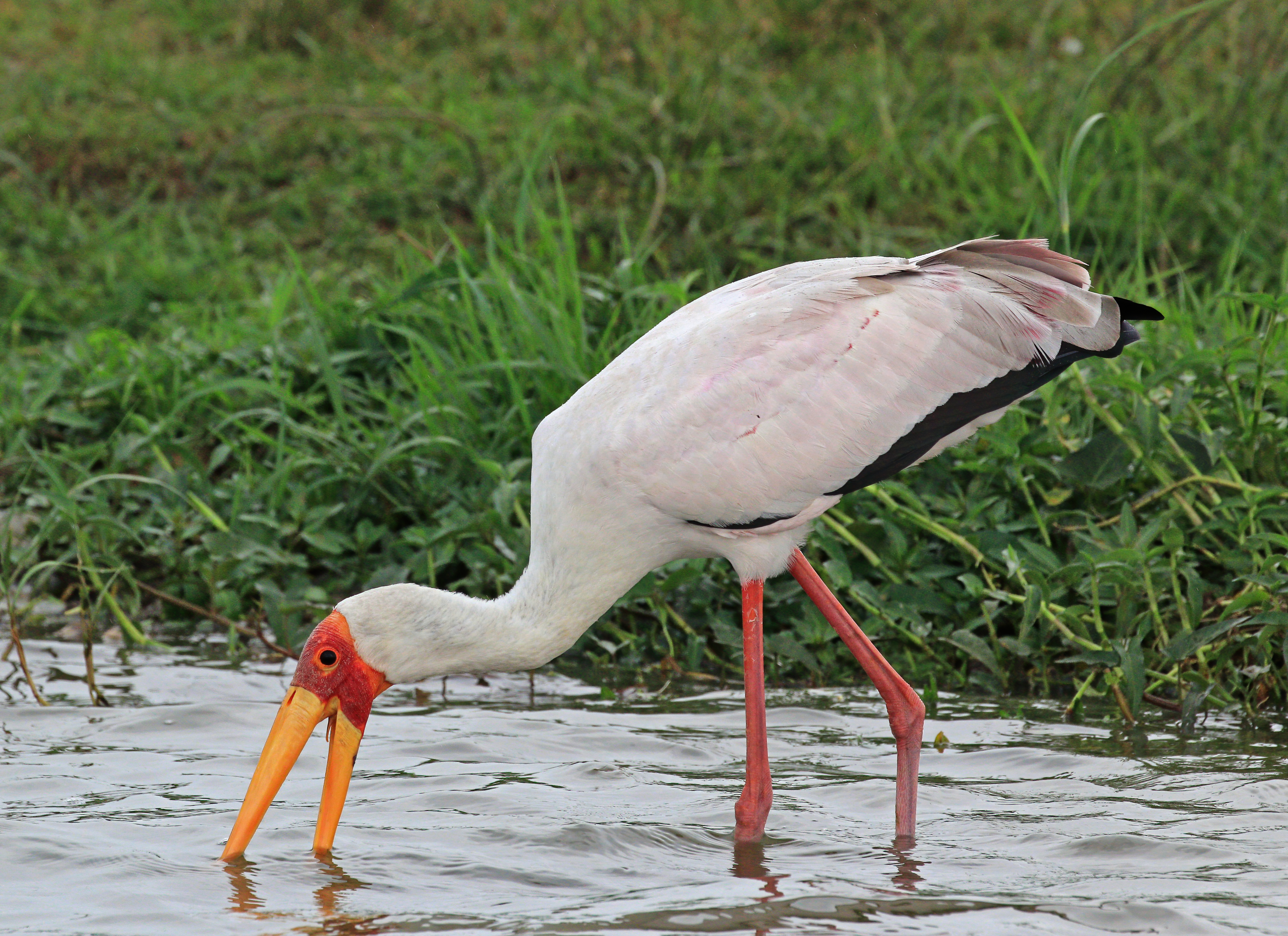
- Yellow-billed stork (M. ibis) in Uganda

Scientific classification
- Kingdom: Animalia
- Phylum: Chordata
- Class: Aves
- Order: Ciconiiformes
- Family: Ciconiidae
- Genus: Mycteria; Linnaeus, 1758

Type species
- Mycteria americana (wood stork) Linnaeus, 1758

Species
- Mycteria americana; Mycteria cinerea; Mycteria ibis; Mycteria leucocephala

Synonyms
- Dissourodes

= Mycteria =

Mycteria Temporal range: Middle Miocene to Recent

Genus of birds

Mycteria is a genus of large subtropical and tropical storks (family Ciconiidae) with representatives in the Americas, east Africa, and southern and southeastern Asia. Two species have "ibis" in their scientific or old common names, but they are not related to these birds, and merely resemble some bald-headed ibises.

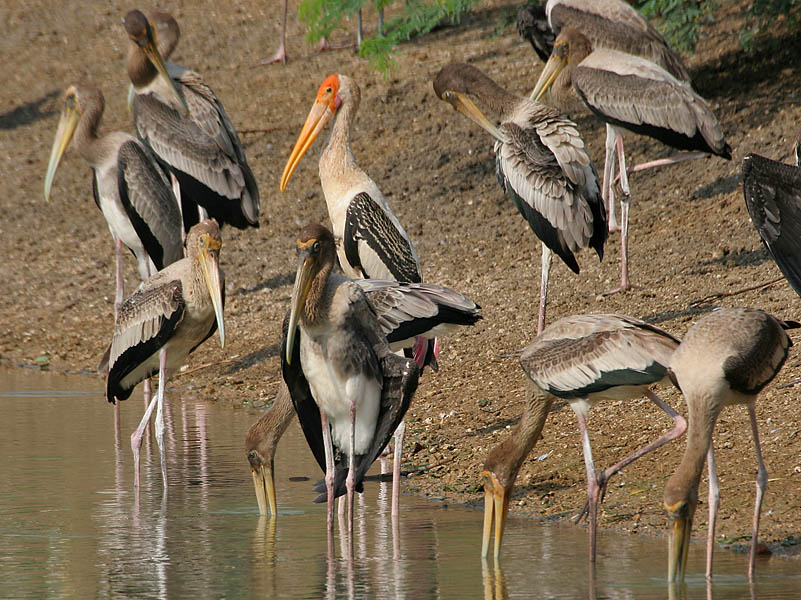
Painted storks (M. leucocephala) at Uppalapadu, Andhra Pradesh, India

Mycteria spp. are large birds, typically around 90–100 cm in length with a 150 cm wingspan. The body plumage is mainly white in all the species, with black in the flight feathers of the wings. The Old World species have bright yellow bills, red or yellow bare facial skin, and red legs; these parts are much duller in the American wood stork. Juvenile Mycteria storks are duller versions of the adults, generally browner and with paler bills.

These storks are gregarious broad-winged soaring birds that fly with the neck outstretched and legs extended. Mycteria spp. are resident breeders in lowland wetlands where they build large stick nests in trees. Most species of Mycteria are diurnal, except for M. americana, which may be nocturnal.

Mycteria storks walk slowly and steadily in shallow open wetlands seeking their prey, which, like that of most of their relatives, consists of fish, frogs and large insects.

== Distribution ==
The genus Mycteria inhabits subtropical and tropical regions. M. americana is distributed throughout the Americas, from the southeastern United States to northern Argentina. M. ibis lives in tropical Africa. M. leucocephala is present in eastern Pakistan and India to Vietnam. M. cinerea lives in Southeast Asia, from Cambodia and Vietnam to Sumatra and Java.

== Taxonomy ==
The genus Mycteria was introduced in 1758 by the Swedish naturalist Carl Linnaeus in the tenth edition of his Systema Naturae for the wood stork (Mycteria americana), the type species. The genus name is from the Ancient Greek μυκτηρ/muktēr meaning "snout" or "nose".

=== Species ===
The genus contains four species.

Genus Mycteria – Linnaeus, 1758 – four species
Common name	Scientific name and subspecies	Range	Size and ecology	IUCN status and estimated population
Wood stork	Mycteria americana Linnaeus, 1758 monotypic	southeastern United States, Mexico, Central America, Cuba, and South America	Size: 85–115 cm (length), 150–175 cm (wingspan), 2050–2640 g (weight) Habitat: swamps and mangroves Diet: fish, insects, amphibians, crustaceans	LC 250,000 birds; 30,000 in U.S. population increasing
Yellow-billed stork	Mycteria ibis (Linnaeus, 1766) monotypic	Senegal and Somalia down to South Africa and in some regions of western Madagascar	Size: Habitat: Diet:	LC
Painted stork	Mycteria leucocephala (Pennant, 1769) monotypic	south of the Himalayan ranges and are bounded on the west by the Indus River system where they are rare and extend eastwards into Southeast Asia	Size: Habitat: Diet:	LC
Milky stork	Mycteria cinerea (Raffles, 1822) monotypic	Southeast Asia	Size: 92–97 cm (length), 43.5–50 cm (wingspan), approx. 630 g (weight) Habitat: mudflats and mangroves Diet: fish, snakes, frogs, insects, crustaceans	EN 600-1,850 birds population declining

=== Fossils ===
Two prehistoric relatives of the wood stork have been described from fossils:

- † Mycteria milleri (Miller's stork) (Valentine Middle Miocene of Cherry County, US) - formerly Dissourodes
- † Mycteria wetmorei (Wetmore's stork) (Late Pleistocene of west and southeast US, and Cuba)

The latter seems to have been a larger sister species of the wood stork, which it replaced in prehistoric North America.

Late Miocene tarsometatarsus fragments (Ituzaingó Formation at Paraná, Argentina) are somewhat similar to Mycteria but still distinct enough to be probably a distinct genus, especially considering their age. A Late Pleistocene distal radius from San Josecito Cavern (Mexico) may belong in this genus or in Ciconia. A "ciconiiform" fossil fragment from the Touro Passo Formation found at Arroio Touro Passo (Rio Grande do Sul, Brazil) might be of the living species M. americana; it is at most of Late Pleistocene age, a few ten thousands of years.
