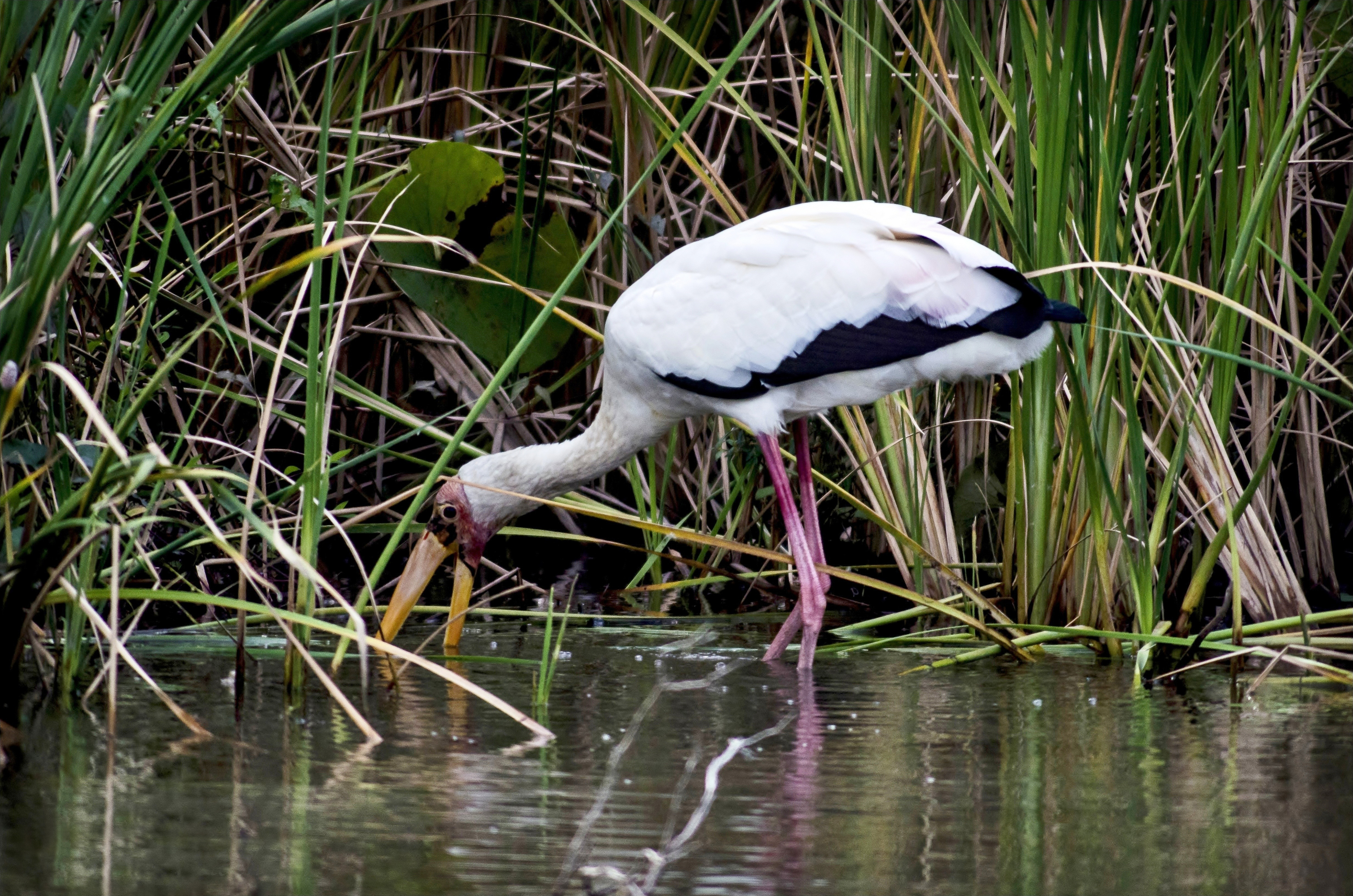
- An individual foraging among bulrush in Singapore

Conservation status
- Endangered (IUCN 3.1)
- CITES Appendix I

Scientific classification
- Kingdom: Animalia
- Phylum: Chordata
- Class: Aves
- Order: Ciconiiformes
- Family: Ciconiidae
- Genus: Mycteria
- Species: M. cinerea

Binomial name
- Mycteria cinerea (Raffles, 1822)
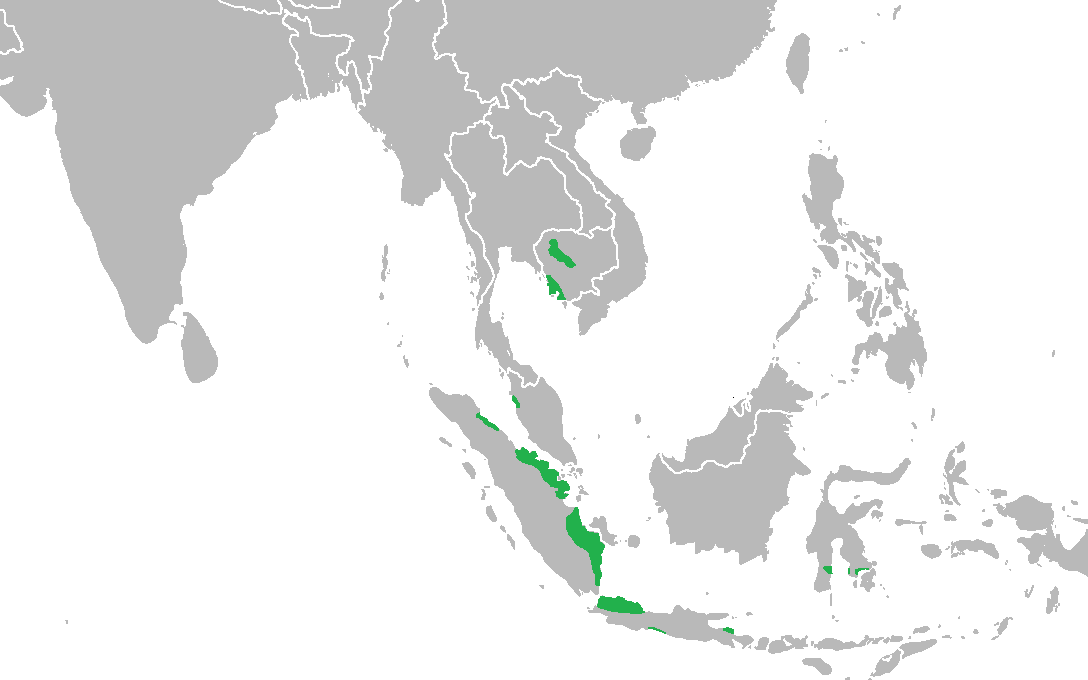
- resident extant range

= Milky stork =

Species of bird

The milky stork (Mycteria cinerea) is a stork species inhabiting predominantly mangroves in Southeast Asia. It is native to Cambodia, Vietnam, Malaysia and Indonesia. It is currently included in the genus Mycteria, is around 91–97 cm (36–38 in) tall, with a wingspan of 43.5–50 cm (17.1–19.7 in) and a tail around 14.5–17 cm (5.7–6.7 in). Its plumage is white apart from a few feathers at the wings and tail. Since the 1980s, the global milky stork population has declined from 5,000 to 2,000 individuals due to habitat destruction, overfishing and illegal smuggling of chicks. It is listed as Endangered on the IUCN Red List.

== Taxonomy and systematics ==
The milky stork was formerly placed in the genus Ibis, with the binomial name Ibis cinereus, but is now included in the Mycteria due to large similarities in appearance and behaviour to the three other storks in this genus (the wood stork, yellow-billed stork, and painted stork). Phylogenetic studies based on DNA hybridization and cytochrome oxidase b have demonstrated that the milky stork shares a clade with other Mycteria, and forms a sister pair of species with the painted stork.

== Description ==
=== Adult ===
This medium stork stands 91–97 cm tall, making it slightly smaller than the closely related painted stork. The adult plumage is completely white except for black flight feathers of the wing and tail, which also have a greenish gloss. Wing length measures 435–500 mm and the tail measures 145–170 mm. The extensive white portion of the plumage is completely suffused with a pale creamy yellow during the breeding season, hence the term "milky". This creamy tint is absent from the plumage during breeding. The wing coverts and back feathers are paler and have an almost white terminal band.

The bare facial skin is greyish or dark maroon; with black, irregular blotches. During breeding, the bare facial skin is deep wine red with black markings on the lores by the bill base and gular region, with a ring of brighter red skin around the eye. Soon after courtship, the facial skin fades to paler orange-red. Breeding birds also show a narrow pinkish band of bare skin along the underside of the wing.

The downcurved bill is dull pinkish yellow and sometimes tipped white. The culmen length measures 194 – 275mm. The legs are a dull red-flesh colour, with the tarsi measuring 188 – 225mm. It has long thick toes that probably serve to increase surface area of its feet and therefore reduce pressure from standing and walking on the soft mud of its foraging area, so that the bird does not sink considerably when foraging and feeding.

During courtship, the bill turns deep yellow, with a greyish tan on the basal third; and the legs become deep magenta. The sexes are similar, but the average male is slightly larger with a longer, thinner bill.

The adult is readily recognisable in the field by its white head feathers, yellow-orange bill, and pink legs. It is distinguished from other waders such as egrets and lesser adjutants by its extensively white body plumage and black wing coverts. However, the milky stork resembles and may therefore be confused with the partly sympatric Asian Openbill and various white egret species. Nevertheless, the egrets are smaller and completely white, and the Asian Openbill is also smaller and distinguished from the milky stork by the grey bill. In the northern part of its range around Vietnam, milky storks occasionally occur in sympatry with the closely related and morphologically similar painted storks. However, the painted stork is distinguished from the milky stork in adult plumage by the former's black and white breast band and wing coverts, pink inner secondaries, more restricted bare head skin, and generally brighter soft part colouration.

Like other storks, the milky stork usually soars on thermals to travel between areas. Flocks of up to a dozen birds can be seen soaring on thermals at great heights between 10:00 and 14:00. At breeding colonies and feeding grounds, flight is contagious in that take-off by one bird is quickly followed by others. Average flapping rate has been estimated at 205 beats per minute.

=== Juvenile ===
At hatching, the chicks are covered with white down. Contour feathers begin to appear by 10–14 days, and the chicks become fully feathered with full plumage after 4–6 weeks. This plumage is typically pale greyish brown with a white lower back, rump and tail coverts; some white downy feathers remaining under the wings and underside of the body; black wing and tail feathers with a white and dark brown wing lining; distinct feathering on the greyish brown head, and dull yellow bare parts. After about 10 weeks when juveniles have fledged, loss of head feathers begins; and the dark, bare areas on the forehead and sides of the head around the eyes become visible. These dark bare areas are sometimes interspersed with dull orange spots. Nestlings also have a dark brownish grey bill and skin around the bill and eye.

By the age of three months, the previously feathered head is now completely bald and the dull bill has become warm yellow with a greenish yellow tip. Both features are characteristic of adults. Milky stork juveniles appear almost identical to painted stork juveniles, but are said to be distinguishable from painted stork juveniles by their paler underwing lining contrasting with the completely black flight feathers, whereas this underwing lining is completely black in painted storks.

=== Other features ===
The milky stork is usually silent during non-breeding. At nests, individuals utter a falsetto "fizz" call during the Up-Down display. The young utter a froglike croak when begging for food.

Especially in captivity in National Zoo of Malaysia, Singapore Zoo, and Dusit Zoo, milky storks and painted interbreed to produce hybrid offspring. These hybrids apparently vary in appearance through different combinations of milky stork and painted stork phenotypes in varying proportions. Because these hybrid juveniles are not readily distinguishable from pure-bred juveniles based on morphology, molecular methods have been used to detect possible hybrids. Compared to the parent painted stork, the adult hybrid has a pink rather than orange bill and head. Adult hybrids may also have some small black spots on the white wing and a subtle pink tinge on the feathers.

Across all ages in this species, the iris is dark brown; and the legs are pinkish, but appear white due to a covering of the birds' excreta.

== Distribution and habitat ==
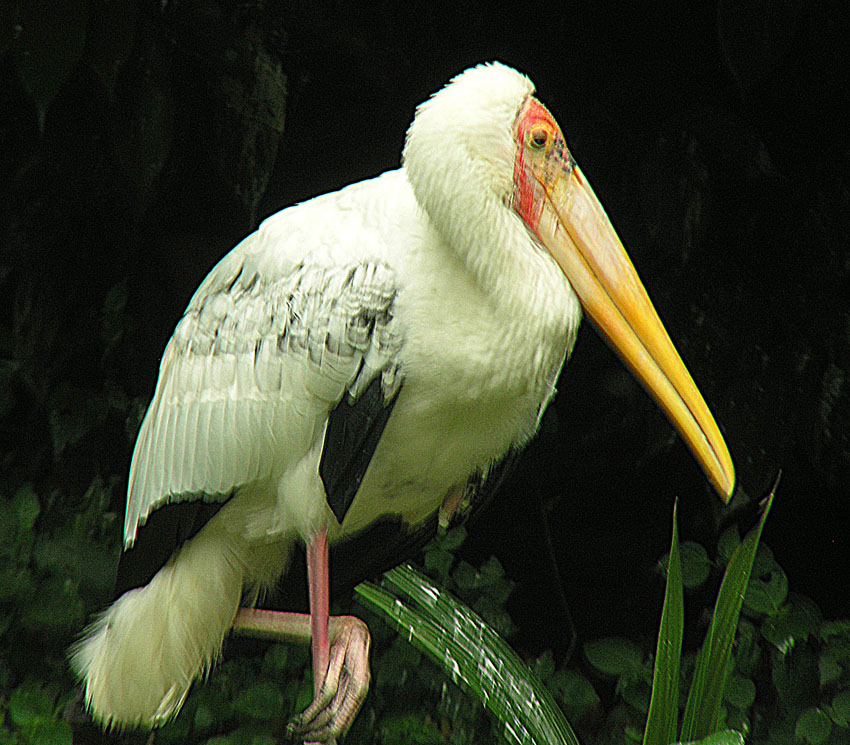
Milky stork in Borneo

The milky stork's range is restricted to Southeast Asia, where it is widely but patchily distributed. It occurs in Sumatra (its global stronghold), Java, Sulawesi, eastern Malaysia, Cambodia, southern Vietnam (where it probably largely recolonised after the war of 1963–75), Bali, Sumbawa, Lombok and Buton. It historically occurred in southern Thailand, but is now very likely extinct there. One perfect adult male milky stork specimen from Setul in Peninsula Thailand taken from 1935 was later found among collections of the Zoological Reference Collection at the National University of Singapore, suggesting that the species was formerly resident here. The discovered specimen was the first, and probably also the last milky stork to be reported from Thailand, although this stork probably still occasionally visits Thailand as a vagrant. It is also vagrant elsewhere to countries such as Bali and Sumbawa, and is resident on Sumatra, Java and Sulawesi (all within Indonesia). The milky stork was first reported on Sulawesi when a group of five apparently resident individuals was sighted there in 1977. The island of Madura may also support an important population after 170 individuals were sighted there in 1996.

The milky stork previously ranged more widely throughout Southeast Asia. For example, it was formerly widely distributed along the coasts of the Malaysian Peninsula, but is now restricted to Matang Mangrove Forest in Perak.

The milky stork is predominantly a lowland coastal species throughout its range; where it inhabits mangrove, freshwater and peat swamps, and estuaries. The only proven breeding records however are reported from mangroves bordering the feeding grounds. It forages on tidal mudflats, in shallow saline or freshwater pools, freshwater marshes, fishponds, rice fields; and on backswamps along river floodplains up to 15 km from the coast. The milky stork's breeding habitat requirements are extensive and undisturbed mangrove (and probably also riverine or dryland) forest with tall, outstanding trees behind it; and shallow pools within the forest for juveniles to forage in. The tall trees are also used for resting, and there should be sufficient individual limbs from which to take off. With a lack of such suitable trees, manmade alternatives such as cart wheels mounted on poles have been proposed.

In Peninsular Malaysia, the milky stork is more exclusively marine than the congeneric painted stork. However, the two species' ranges are said to overlap in the marshy plains of Cambodia, where they probably use the same habitats.

== Migration and other movements ==
The milky stork probably undertakes short seasonal migration outside the breeding season, but little is known of the timing and path of such movements. Local migrations by milky storks (and several other wader species) may be caused by onset of drought in the dry season. In Cambodia however, it disperses during the wet season from Tonlé Sap Lake probably to the coast. Milky storks are reported migrating from Sumatra to Java, and across the Sunda Straits, in September and October. Although these apparent migrations are not extensively mapped, milky stork flocks are reported to range over 200 km in a day.

Adults breeding on the Javan island of Pulau Rambut have also been noted to commute daily on and off the island to feed at the fishponds and rice fields on the Javan mainland. The breeding colony on Pulau Rambut may also be irregularly visited by varying numbers of migrants throughout the year.

== Behaviour and ecology ==
=== Breeding ===
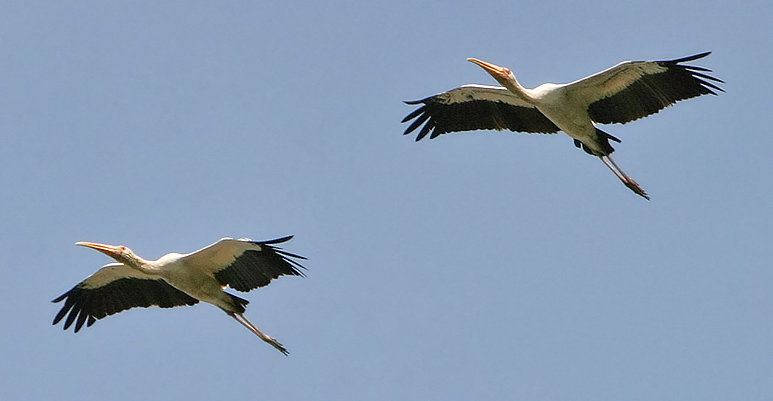
A pair of milky storks in flight in Singapore

Breeding typically occurs after the rains during the dry season that can last from April to November. The onset of breeding can vary in timing throughout the species' range, but usually lasts for three months and probably coincides with maximum fish stocks and density following fish reproduction in the rainy season. In South Sumatra for example, the milky stork can breed June–September, and has been observed in breeding plumage in May, or as early as February. Breeding is probably slightly earlier in Java given that eggs have been found in nests here as early as March, with one report of a clutch fledging in July (Hoogerwerf, 1936). Breeding in Java is however probably commonest July–August. At Tonle Sap in Cambodia, egg-laying can begin in January and February where the dry season begins even earlier. In Malaysia, eggs have been found in nests exclusively in August.

The milky stork breeds colonially in mangrove swamps, with breeding colonies ranging in size from 10–20 to a few hundred nests. In Java, breeding colonies of 75–100 nests have been estimated to cover 4.5 ha, with 5–8 nests per tree within colonies having been recorded. The height of the nest above the ground notably varies. Nests are commonly built in tall Avicennia marina and other Avicennia tree species in Java, and Rhizosphora apiculata trees in Sumatra, in both cases usually 6–14 m above ground, but sometimes in the very tops of trees. Nests on Pulau Rambut are built in tops of outstanding mangrove trees 30 m high. Similar nesting characteristics were observed on the island of Pulau Dua when the species still bred there. In Indonesia, some milky storks nest close to the ground in dense shrubs of Acrostichum mangrove ferns 2-6m above the ground. Milky storks also commonly nest in dead or dying mangrove trees. Further, some colonies in South Sumatra have been located far inland at brackish lakes or freshwater swamps in Alstonia trees reaching up to 60 m high.

The nests are sturdy, bulky structures measuring about 50 cm in diameter and predominantly comprising medium live sticks of Avicenna species on which many leaves are still attached. These nests resemble those of the grey heron and the white ibis but are slightly more robust and comprise thicker twigs. However, other nests found have been small and flimsy structures that resemble those of doves. When collecting nesting material, milky storks break off live branches from trees by grasping the branch with their bill and flying upwards a short distance, which appears to be a difficult task and sometimes unsuccessful. If the stork does not manage the free the branch, it moves on to another one. Nest building continues even with young in the nest.

Clutch sizes range from 1–4 eggs, but 2–3 eggs are typical. Egg dimensions measure 59.0–74.5 mm in length and 43.0–48.0 mm in width, are relatively small compared to the adult body size, and resemble those of Leptoptilos javanicus, but are slightly paler. The incubation period is estimated at 27–30 days. Several days can elapse between the hatching of the first and last egg, so that the oldest and youngest chicks differ considerably in size. The clutch is alternately brooded by the male and female. When parents exchange nest duties, the returning parent and brooding parent greet each other with loud, rapid bill clattering, accompanied by deep head bowing and neck stretching. In response to disturbances at the nest, the brooding bird gives an arching display that typically resembles that in other Mycteria species.

Courtship consists of repeated bowing and bill-raising from both partners, who stand opposite each other and perform this display in a mirror action. Many displays at the nest resemble those of other Mycteria species. The male at the nest advertises to the arriving female using display preening, whereupon the female responds with a balancing posture and gaping. An up-down greeting display from both partners follows the arrival of one partner at the nest, and the male adopts a flying-around display upon female arrival. Both partners at the nest retract the skin of their head to expose two or three times as much bare skin as between displays when the skin hangs loosely.

In South Sumatra, it is found to breed alongside lesser adjutants, black-headed ibis, and various heron species. In Cambodia, milky storks have been reported breeding alongside painted storks, lesser adjutants, and spot-billed pelicans in flooded forest around Tonle Sap during the early dry season in January and February. Colonies here are situated in mangrove backswamps 1–4 km from the coast in dense Archostichum ferns or dead trees.

Breeding in Malaysia is probably at best scarce and unsuccessful. Several adult storks were observed in breeding plumage at Kuala Gula in July 1984, and about 20 nests were reported there in 1989 together with an increasing adult population. Before these observations, signs of breeding in this species had not been recorded since 1935. However, no juveniles have been seen in Malaysia since 1983, and the apparent lack of breeding success has probably been due to high predation pressure. Breeding no longer occurs on the Javan Island of Pulau Dua. Since the mid-1970s, this island has been connected with the Javan mainland through rapid coastal accretion; whereupon easy human access led to large-scale deforestation for firewood harvest. Breeding ceased due to removal of suitable nesting habitat of tall trees. However, individuals have still been seen on the island in courtship and there have been suggestions that the breeding status could be restored here through rigorous conservation measures. Some breeding still occurs on Pulau Rambut; a few breeding pairs were observed here at Jakarta Bay in 2014.

Young captive milky storks can become sexually mature from three months of age, but breeders at this age appear precocious and inexperienced; so that actual breeding age is probably slightly older. In its natural habitat, young storks begin to leave their natal breeding grounds at 3–4 months of age. Especially in captivity, the milky stork is further found to occasionally breed with the painted stork. One hybrid of a male lesser adjutant and female milky stork was also hatched at Jurong Bird Park, Singapore.

=== Food and feeding ===
The milky stork's diet is diverse. In Malaysia, the core of the diet appears to comprise mudskippers of Periophthalmus and Gobiidae 10–23 cm long; although catfish Arius spp. may be a main dietary component in South Sumatra. Other prey recorded from South Sumatra include milkfish, giant mudskipper (Periophthalmodon schlosseri), mullet species of Moolgards and Chelon, eel catfish (Plotosus canius), fourfinger threadfin (Eleutheronema tetradactylum), and Chinese silver pomfret (Pampus chinesis). Snakes and frogs are reportedly also taken for food, especially to feed to young. Parents feed nestlings large fishes, eels, and mudskippers up to 20 cm long. In Sumatra, the elongate mudskipper (Pseudapocryptes elongates) was the most common prey found in nests Other prey found in nests include the Indian prawn (Fenneropenaeus indicus) and one clupeid fish species (Thryssa dussumieri).

The young eat voraciously; small young up to two weeks old can be fed by the parent bird up to four times in two hours, but older young less often. Because feeding begins before all young have hatched, the youngest (and smallest) chicks are competitively disadvantaged and commonly die of starvation, especially since the parent bird does not appear to distribute food equally among the brood. At high temperatures, adults sometimes bring water to the nest and drool it from their bills over the nestlings for cooling and drinking.

Milky storks also appear to exploit commercial shrimp as food. Active shrimp ponds usually last for three months before drying, whereupon remaining shrimp are exposed on the bottom as water level recedes, and milky stork and other waders come to feed on the remaining shrimps. Such a feeding advantage could become increasingly available as land-based aquaculture expands in Kuala Gula. In Java, they are also reported to feed at fishponds, especially after the dry season when waters have receded to uncover mud expanses suitable for their feeding. These manmade environments may however disfavour breeding.

The milky stork's daily food intake has been estimated at 630 g wet weight, which may be able to be met within two hours at maximum foraging intensity.

Various feeding mechanisms have been noted in this stork. However, as in other Mycteria, the milky stork locates and captures prey predominantly by sense of touch, usually by bill groping or direct bill probing. Because food location is primarily tactile, foraging is most efficient at high prey concentrations. The groping method consists of walking slowly through shallow water with the partially open bill submerged about three quarters in the water. The stork rapidly shuts its mandibles when a prey item touches the groping till, raises its head and quickly swallows the item whole after some tossing. After swallowing a large fish, the stork may rest for up to one minute before resuming foraging. Alternatively, the bird may stand passively at the water's edge with its half-open bill steadily submerged in the water where waves are present, so that water flows through the bird's mandibles. The milky stork also sometimes draws its bill through the water in an arc side-to-side when standing or walking, until the bill touches a prey item.

Another common tactile feeding method in this stork is direct probing of its bill around deep holes in the mud. With partially open mandibles, the bird inserts and partially withdraws its bill from the mud for 5–32 seconds per hole. The bill is often inserted into the mud three quarters up the bill length, but sometimes along the full or up to the eyes.

Other foraging methods observed in this stork are prey herding mechanisms typical of other Mycteria species. One of these is foot stirring, whereby the stork stands on one leg and disturbs the river bed with the foot of the opposite leg; which may drive aquatic prey from places inaccessible to the storks. Milky storks also forage in flocks at high prey density, whereby they cooperatively flush fish in shallow water to divert them to their half-open bills; as has been observed in Java. Milky storks also often feed in aggregations alongside other wading bird species such as lesser adjutant and egrets. This stork occasionally detects aquatic prey by direct visual searching.

During and after the local rainy season, which lasts from November to March, individuals apparently forage in great numbers in the inundated rice fields; and lower numbers of individuals observed at the coast may reflect the more favourable feeding conditions further inland. Sightings have been regularly reported along the Batang Hari River 50 km from the coast. During breeding, juveniles commonly forage near the breeding colony in shallow mangrove pools with high fish density.

=== Other behavior ===
During high tide, individuals often roost in mangrove trees or in remnant trees on rice fields. Roosting also occurs in crowns of tall mangrove trees and on the ground on intertidal mudflats and marshes. Between foraging activities, individuals have been observed standing in shaded spots or in the sun adopting a wings drooped position.

Common comfort movements in the milky stork include allopreening between breeding partners and head shaking. Individuals perched near incubating partners also carrying out head rubbing, whereby the stork oils the bare head skin on its preen gland and then rubs its head on its plumage.

== Threats and survival ==
The global milky stork population has been declining substantially, especially from the late 1980s, and has been largely attributable to habitat destruction and disturbance through mangrove deforestation for human activities such as fish farming, tidal rice cultivation, timber exploitation, and in Indonesia, human resettlement. Deforestation has led to a lack of suitable mature trees for the species to nest in and thereby affected breeding success. Breeding colonies have also declined through increased illegal international trade in this bird from the mid-1980s and, especially in South Sumatra, poaching of eggs and juveniles for human consumption. Juveniles in particular have been sold to and purchased by zoos in Singapore, Kuala Lumpur, Brunei, and several European zoos. The milky stork is said to be generally vulnerable to human disturbance, which may also explain the marked widespread decline of this species. Although fishponds and shrimp farms, for example, can provide additional feeding grounds and therefore allow feeding opportunism for this species, presence of these manmade structures can disturb nearby breeding and therefore affect the population in the long term.

The milky stork was essentially eliminated from Vietnam through widespread destruction of mangrove swamps during the Southeast Asian War in 1963–75. Subsequent large-scale reforestation may however have led to some recolonization; although the species has also suffered long-term effects of herbicide application in Southern Vietnam in later years.

This stork has various natural predators. In South Sumatra, monitor lizards, especially Varanus salvator, have been reported to predate milky stork eggs and juveniles. Crocodiles (Crocodilus porosus) also sometimes eat young milky storks. In Matang Mangrove Forest in Malaysia, brahminy kites, water monitor lizards, and common palm civets (Paradoxurus hermaphroditus) are potential (nest) predators and probably contribute to low survival here. In captivity in Malaysia, the milky stork may also be potentially threatened by the crab-eating macaque (Macaca fascicularis), which is a potential predator of stork eggs and chicks, and whose range has gradually expanded here. This monkey could swim across to nest sites surrounded by water, as they have done for captive grey herons. On Pulau Rambut, potential predators include reticulated python, cat snakes (especially Boiga dendrophila), and Brahminy kite. White bellied sea eagle Haliaeetus leucogaster and monitor lizard are also reported to predate chicks here.

Another potential threat to the milky stork is contamination of its natural habitat with elevated concentrations of ions of metals such as copper, zinc and lead. Sources of this observed contamination include use of agrochemicals in Kuala Gula, corrosion and runoff from jetties and boats coated with these metals, and aquaculture development. On Pulau Rambut, breeding colonies might also be threatened by increasing sea pollution.

Population recovery for this species has relied largely on captive breeding. In 1987, the first captive breeding and reintroduction project for the milky stork was initiated in Zoo Negara in Malaysia (a country where the wild milky stork population declined by over 90% from the 1980s to 2005) from a small young group of five males and five females received from Singapore Zoo and Johor Zoo. From these 10 individuals, the captive population increased to over 100 individuals by 2005. Therefore, with the decline in the wild milky stork population in Malaysia since the 1980s, the captive, free-flying population has steadily risen.

The first successful milky stork reintroduction was carried out in Kuala Selangor Nature Park in 1998 with the release of 10 captive-bred individuals here. Matang Mangrove Forest in Malaysia has been a popular candidate reintroduction site because this area is considered a suitable milky stork habitat in terms of shelter, breeding and feeding grounds; and there are apparently minimal threats from predators and parasites. The area is also protected and systematically managed, and raw materials are sustainably harvested here. However, captive individuals released into their natural habitat face new potential threats such as susceptibility to disease, lack of ability to hunt for food and defend territory, and lack of ability to effectively detect and evade potential predators. These released individuals may also harbour disease and parasites that could harm wild populations.

Particularly for captive individuals, there is the risk of a loss of genetic integrity through hybridization with painted storks in captivity or in the wild in the northern parts of the milky stork range where it may co-occur with the painted stork.

Where successful, conservation of this species in the wild has relied on maintaining an integrated network of wetland preserves, as has been done in reforestation and protection schemes in Vietnam that may have led to some recolonization by the species. Raising public awareness for this species and its threatened status has also been identified as an indispensable action for successful conservation.

== In culture and relationship to humans ==
The milky stork is well known among Indonesian locals and is readily distinguished by them in the field from other waders; although it has at least historically been commonly (and sometimes illegally) harvested for meat and eggs. Like many other wading bird species, the milky stork is also sometimes considered a minor pest in the aquaculture industry by feeding on commercial fish and shrimps. This stork is however officially protected in Malaysia and Indonesia and has been listed on Appendix I of CITES since 1987.

This stork has occasionally appeared in zoos such as Vienna Zoo and Washington Park Zoo, with the latter having held the longest living milky stork specimen, which lived for 12 years, 4 months and 18 days (1937–1950). Many juvenile zoo specimens have been misidentified as young painted storks on purchase, and later proved to be milky storks. The only zoos which are recorded as having bred the species are Zoo Negara (where the stork bred in captivity for the first time in 1987), San Diego Zoo and Singapore Zoo. Captive breeding and reintroduction programmes for this stork have been widely supported by government and non-government agencies such as Perhilitan, the Malaysian Nature Society, and the Malaysian Zoological Society.

A milky stork in flight features on the logo of Sembilang National Park. It has also commonly appeared on calendars and posters in public awareness campaigns in Sumatra.

== Status ==
In 2023, the global population was estimated to be between 1,200–1,850 mature individuals, a reduction from approximately 5,000 in the 1980s. In Malaysia, population counts decreased steadily from over 100 individuals in 1984 to less than 10 by 2005 (by over 90%), so that the population here faces local extinction. Of the current world population estimate, almost all milky storks live in Indonesia. There are probably about 800–1,600 individuals in Sumatra, approximately 100–200 between populations on Java and Sulawesi, and few, if any, remaining in breeding populations on the southeast Asian mainland. The Cambodian population is very small, numbering 100–150 individuals; and although it may be relatively stable, rapid declines are expected if serious threats persist. Due to the substantial population declines across its range, the milky stork's population status was elevated to Endangered from Vulnerable in 2013 by the IUCN.
