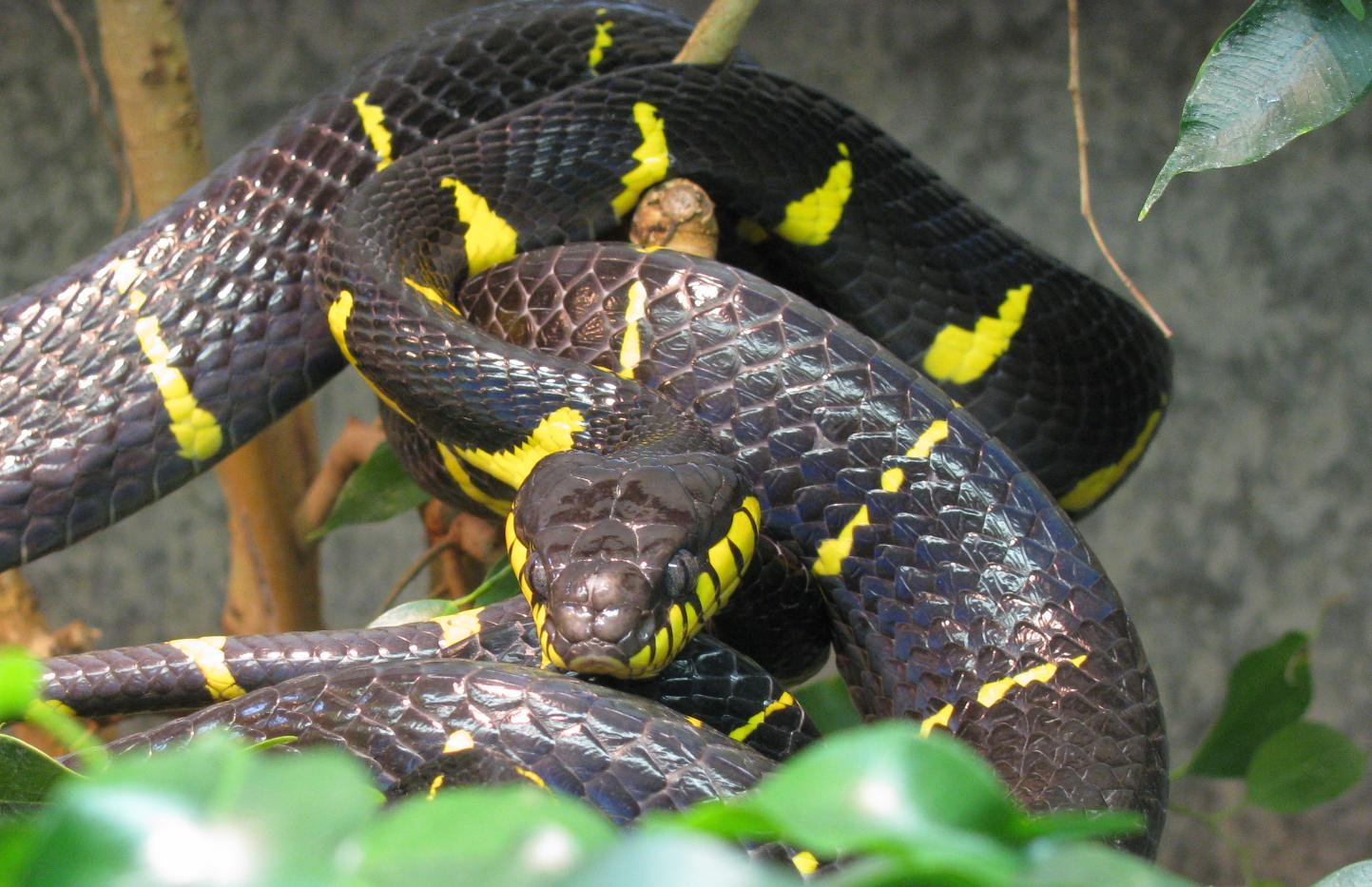

Conservation status
- Least Concern (IUCN 3.1)

Scientific classification
- Kingdom: Animalia
- Phylum: Chordata
- Class: Reptilia
- Order: Squamata
- Suborder: Serpentes
- Family: Colubridae
- Genus: Boiga
- Species: B. dendrophila

Binomial name
- Boiga dendrophila (F. Boie, 1827)

Synonyms
- Dipsas dendrophila F. Boie, 1827; Triglyphodon dendrophilum — A.M.C. Duméril & Bibron, 1854; Dipsadomorphus dendrophilus — Boulenger, 1896; Boiga dendrophila — Brongersma, 1934

= Boiga dendrophila =

Species of snake

Boiga dendrophila, commonly called the mangrove snake or the gold-ringed cat snake, is a species of rear-fanged venomous snake in the family Colubridae. The species is endemic to southeast Asia. It is one of the biggest cat snake species, averaging 8–9 feet (2.4–2.7 m) in length. It is considered mildly venomous. Although moderate envenomations resulting in intense swelling have been reported, there has never been a confirmed fatality.

== Description ==
B. dendrophila has the following characteristics: Snout longer than eye; rostral broader than deep, visible from above; internasals as long as or shorter than the prae-frontals; frontal as long as or slightly shorter than its distance from the tip of the snout; loreal at least as long as deep; a praeocular extending to the upper surface of the head, not reaching the frontal; two postoculars; temporals 2 + 2 or 2 + 3; eight (nine) upper labials, third to fifth entering the eye; four or five lower labials in contact with the anterior chin-shields; latter as long as or longer than the posterior; anterior palatine teeth not much larger than the posterior. Scales in 21 (23) rows, vertebral row enlarged; ventrals 209–239; anal entire; subcaudals 89. Black above, with yellow transverse bands, continuous or not extending across the back; labials yellow, with black edges. Lower surface black or bluish, uniform or speckled with yellow; throat yellow.

== Behavior ==
Mostly nocturnal, B. dendrophila is a potentially defensive snake. Even captive bred specimens can be nervous and may strike repeatedly. Although many specimens will calm down and allow handling, it is normally easily stressed and may refuse food for extended periods of time if disturbed.

== Geographic range ==
B. dendrophila is present across Southeast Asia and Indochina, found in Cambodia, Indonesia (Bangka, Belitung, Borneo, Java, the Riau Archipelago, Sulawesi, Sumatra), Brunei, Malaysia, Myanmar, the Philippines, Singapore, Thailand, and Vietnam.

== Subspecies ==
Including the nominotypical subspecies, nine subspecies are recognized as being valid.

Nota bene: A trinomial authority in parentheses indicates that the subspecies was originally described in a genus other than Boiga.

- Boiga dendrophila annectens (Boulenger, 1896) – Indonesia (Kalimantan); Brunei Darussalam; East Malaysia
- Boiga dendrophila dendrophila (F. Boie, 1827) – Indonesia (Java).
- Boiga dendrophila divergens Taylor, 1922 – Philippines (Luzon, Polillo)
- Boiga dendrophila gemmicincta (A.M.C. Duméril, Bibron & A.H.A. Duméril, 1854) – Indonesia (Sulawesi).
- Boiga dendrophila latifasciata (Boulenger, 1896) – Philippines (Mindanao)
- Boiga dendrophila levitoni Gaulke, Demegillo & G. Vogel, 2005 – Panay (and probably other islands of the West Visayas region)
- Boiga dendrophila multicincta (Boulenger, 1896) – Philippines (Balabac, Palawan)
- Boiga dendrophila occidentalis Brongersma, 1934 – Indonesia (Babi, Batu Archipelago, Nias, Sumatra)

== Etymology ==
The subspecific name, levitoni, is in honor of American herpetologist Alan E. Leviton (born 1930).

== Taxonomy ==
B. dendrophila sensu lato (including B. d. melanota), was found to be paraphyletic to Boiga tanahjampeana. In 2021 it was proposed to elevate B. melanota to a separate species to preserve the monophyly of remaining B. dendrophila.

== Habitat ==
Despite one of its common names, mangrove snake, B. dendrophila is found more often in lowland rainforests than in the mangrove swamps from which its common name is derived.

== Diet ==
B. dendrophila feeds on reptiles (such as the hatchlings of green sea turtles), birds (possibly including milky storks), and small mammals (possibly including large treeshrews).

== Venom ==
In common with other colubrids, mangrove snakes have a Duvernoy's gland on the posterior end of the eye with a duct that connects to the rear fangs. The snake needs to chew in order to release the venom, which is released gradually. The venom of the mangrove cat snake is weak, the fangs in the rear are not large, and it is difficult for the snake to open its mouth wide enough to sink the fangs into a human leg or arm; as of 2016, there are no confirmed fatalities. Denmotoxin is a three-finger toxin that has been identified in the venom of mangrove cat snakes, and is the first fully characterized bird-specific toxin.

Although envenomation of humans is mild, visually, because of the alternation of black and yellow crossbands and triangular body cross section, the mangrove cat snake can be confused with the banded krait, which is extremely venomous.

== Gallery ==
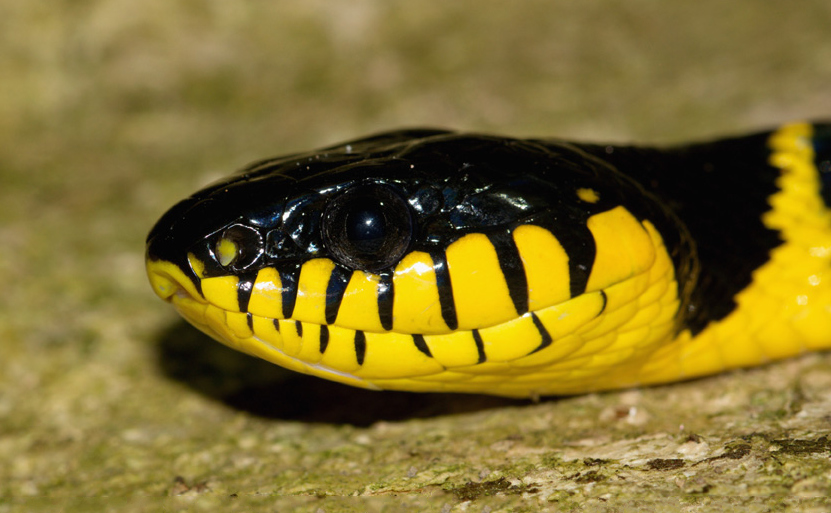
Boiga dendrophila from Singapore

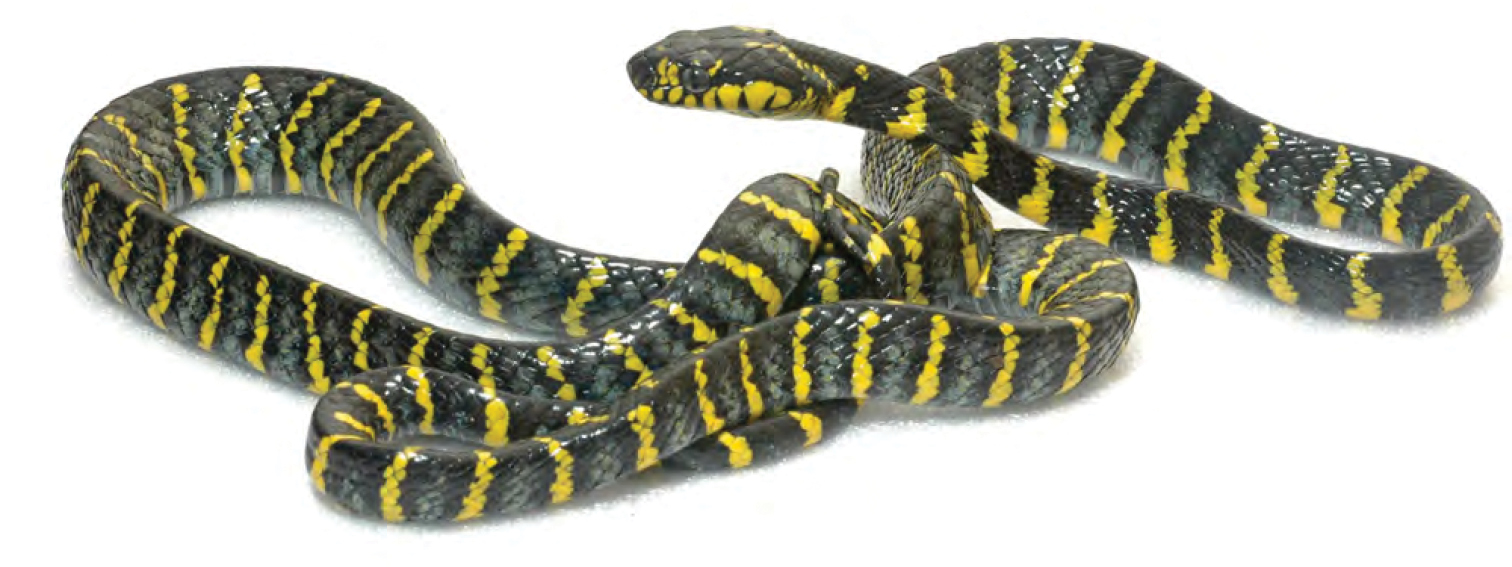
B. dendrophila divergens

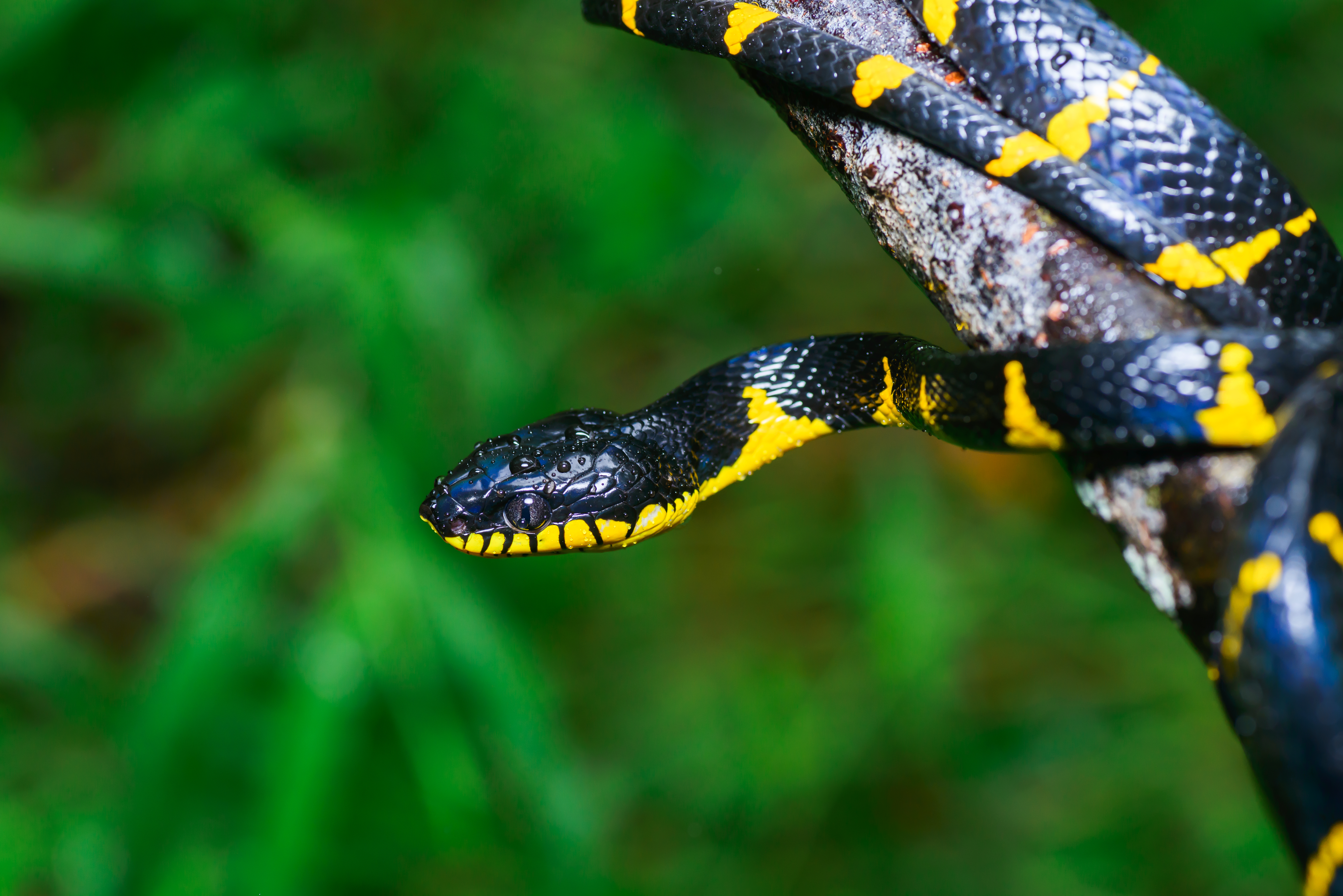
B. dendrophila in Khao Sok National Park, Thailand
