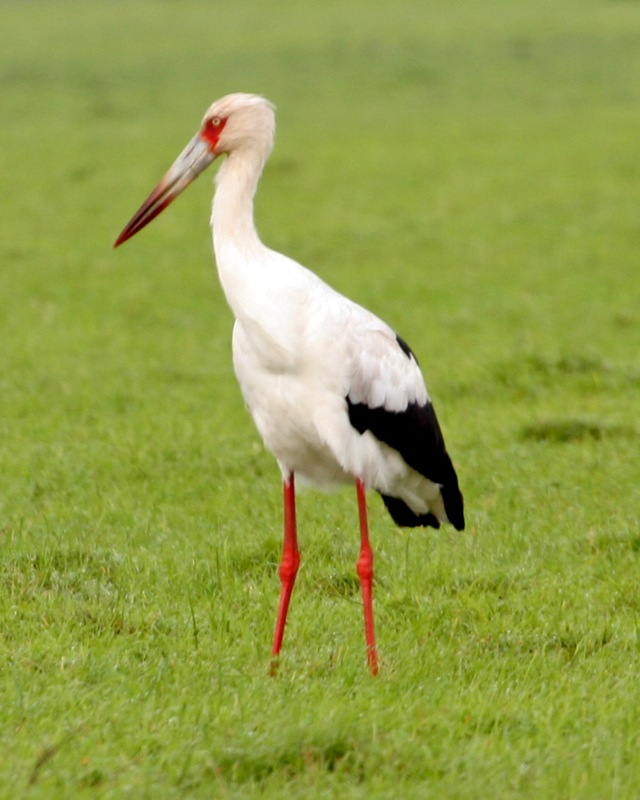

Conservation status
- Least Concern (IUCN 3.1)

Scientific classification
- Kingdom: Animalia
- Phylum: Chordata
- Class: Aves
- Order: Ciconiiformes
- Family: Ciconiidae
- Genus: Ciconia
- Species: C. maguari

Binomial name
- Ciconia maguari (Gmelin, JF, 1789)
- Nonbreeding Year-round

= Maguari stork =

Species of bird

The maguari stork (Ciconia maguari) is a large species of stork that inhabits seasonal wetlands over much of South America, and is very similar in appearance to the white stork; albeit slightly larger. It is the only species of its genus to occur in the New World and is one of the only three New World stork species, together with the wood stork and the jabiru.

== Taxonomy ==
The maguari stork was formally described in 1789 by the German naturalist Johann Friedrich Gmelin in his revised and expanded edition of Carl Linnaeus's Systema Naturae. He placed it with the herons, cranes and storks in the genus Ardea and coined the binomial name Ardea maguari. Gmelin's description was ultimately based on the "Maguari Brasiliensibus" that had been described and illustrated in 1648 by the German naturalist Georg Marcgrave in his book Historia Naturalis Brasiliae. The maguari stork is now one of seven storks placed in the genus Ciconia that was introduced in 1760 by the French zoologist Mathurin Jacques Brisson. The genus name is the Latin word for "stork". The specific epithet maguari and the common name are from the Tupi language. The species is monotypic: no subspecies are recognised.

This stork was formerly placed in its own genus Euxenura, but was later reclassified as belonging to Ciconia because of its strong morphological and ethological similarity to other storks of this genus. However, the maguari stork most closely resembles both the white stork and the Oriental stork in morphology and behaviour; and strongly resembles the white stork in its manner of performing the up-down greeting display. Plumage pattern and soft part colourations are also very similar between these three stork species. Further, phylogenetic analyses based on a portion of the cytochrome b oxidase gene have suggested that the maguari stork is evolutionarily paired with the white stork-Oriental stork sister group; although the morphological similarity between the maguari stork and the Oriental stork has been considered to be greater than between the white stork and the Oriental stork. Incidentally, the maguari stork also shares the prominent forkedness of its tail with the woolly-necked stork (Ciconia episcopus).

Fossils of the extinct Pleistocene stork Ciconia maltha discovered in North America appear to be morphologically intermediate between the maguari stork and white stork and may therefore represent a common ancestral link between these two species that inhabit different continents. Ciconia maltha was probably highly dispersive and could have extended its range to Venezuela from North America during the Pliocene, part of the range of the extant maguari stork.

== Description ==
=== Adult appearance ===
The bird stands at 97 to 120 cm (3 ft 2 in to 3 ft 11 in) tall and has a wingspan of around 155 to 180 cm (5 ft 1 in to 5 ft 11 in), making it similar in size to the congeneric white stork. Nine male maguari storks weighed an average of 4.2 kg (9.3 lb) while five females weighed an average of 3.8 kg (8.4 lb). It is intermediate in size between the smaller wood stork and the larger jabiru, the two other stork species with which the maguari stork exists in sympatry in some parts of its range. Much of the adult plumage is white, with black flight feathers and a forked blacked tail which is shorter than the stiff white under-tail coverts, so that these protrude from underneath the tail and may function aerodynamically in flight. The forked tail clearly distinguishes the maguari stork from the white stork, and is easily observed in flight from the ground thanks to the white under-tail coverts. During flight, this stork offers an impressive sight. It soars at least a hundred metres above the ground with an outstretched neck and extended legs, intermittently beating its broad wings to gain momentum for long glides. It flaps its wings at a rate of 181 beats per minute and the wingspan measures 150–180 cm. This stork needs to make three long jumps before it can take off from the ground.

Individuals undergo a fresh moult in the breeding season to produce brighter plumage in preparation for courtship. Head and neck feathers consist of long semi-plumes measuring up to 18 cm long that become erectile and are important in courtships and aggressive displays. Barbs on the neck feathers also have no barbules, thus making the neck appear like a translucent net.

The bill is straight, bluish grey, and lined with red. The final third portion along the bill length is dark maroon. The iris is lemon-yellow or cream white and the legs are purplish red. The skin of the throat and the pebbly-textured lores are orangey red, becoming deeper red during courtship. The sexes are largely indistinguishable externally, except that the male is slightly larger with a slightly upward curved bill. Individuals usually weigh 3800-4200 g, with males being heavier.

=== Juvenile appearance ===
A distinct characteristic unique to this stork species is intermediately dark plumage in the young, which persists for most of the nestling period. In the chicks' first few days after hatching, their sparse down is snowy white. The chicks subsequently undergo two basic moults before entering adulthood. The first moult usually begins after four days, in which black semi-plumes on the head and neck begin to emerge; followed shortly by the emergence of greyish-black down feathers over the body after one week of age. Some white down feathers initially remain attached to give a temporary mottled black and white appearance before finally receding to leave a darkish grey downy plumage. During development of the dark down, the bill, legs and feet are shiny black. A pale yellow stripe extends up the venter, the gular pouch is bright orange, and the iris is dark brown. At hatching, nestlings weigh 76-90g.

After the chicks pass their third week of age, the black down develops olive streaks and the only parts of the body that do not appear dark are the bright orange gular skin and a small patch of white down above and below the tail. Just over 10 days later, black flight feathers develop, shortly followed by black contour feathers. At this point, the chicks are fledged and have their first full juvenile plumage after about a month of hatching. Hence, juveniles remain black at fledging, by which time the orange of the gular pouch has also turned pale scarlet.

In the second moult, white down begins to return when the chicks are seven weeks old, followed by white semi-plumes then white contour feathers. The first white basic plumage is complete after three months and resembles that of adults. By this time, the legs and feet are now an incipient pink and the bill has become bicoloured (pale blue and maroon). Although the young now resemble adults, the skin surrounding the eye remains black for about a year before turning red, and the dark brown iris does not begin to yellow until after two years old. These are two potentially useful features that identify juvenile maguari storks; but in the field, the dark iris of the juveniles is the most reliable feature that distinguishes them from adults.

Two hypotheses have been proposed to explain the dark colouration in the juveniles. First, the blackish feathers may serve as camouflage against both ground and aerial predators. Alternatively, the black plumage may serve a thermoregulatory function by enhancing its absorption of the sun's radiation. This could arguably be advantageous because this stork breeds during the winter in the part of its range in the southern hemisphere, so that the chicks can be exposed to low environmental temperatures. However, Thomas regards the anti-predator explanation for the dark plumage to be more plausible.

=== Vocalisations ===
Adults utter wheezing, hissing, disyllabic whistles during up-down greeting displays at the nests about every 1–1.5 seconds. These whistles are slower and lower pitched than the corresponding vocalisations of other Ciconia, but sound similar to those of the Abdim's stork and the woolly-necked stork. The quality of these vocalisations is probably linked with the maguari stork's ground nesting habits and may be an adaptation to minimise attraction of predators' attention. Young make begging calls that have been described as Ehehe-ehehe.

== Distribution and habitat ==
The maguari stork has a relatively wide distribution over much of South America, and occurs primarily to the east of the Andes. It lives in the Llanos of Venezuela and eastern Colombia; Guyana; eastern Bolivia; Paraguay; Brazil, but rarely in the Amazon and the north-east,); Uruguay and Argentina. The most southerly part of the range lies in the Chubut province. It more rarely occurs to the west of the Andes (e.g. in Chile) and probably does not breed there. It is a rare visitor to the Suriname coast from March until May and also been reported as a vagrant on Trinidad and Tobago.

It is especially common and widespread in the Chaco of Argentina, which appears to be a popular destination for flocks of about 30-40 migrant individuals from the southern hemisphere part of the range that come from the south in winter to seek warmer temperatures. The stork is also common in Brazil, especially in the state Rio Grande do Sul, Paraguay and the Pampas of Argentina. It occurs seasonally and is common in the Pantanal of Argentina. Large numbers migrate to the Pantanal in the wet season, probably from the Parana Basin and Rio Grand do Sul. However, overall migration patterns for this species across its range have thus far not been determined exactly.

Its habitat largely comprises open lowland and shallow-water wetland such as tropical wet savannah grasslands, marshes, mudflats, and flooded fields. It more occasionally frequents dry fields, but invariably avoids forested regions. Numerous maguari stork assemblages have been observed in their habitat during the dry season, where they forage in low-level bodies of water where prey is concentrated.

The maguari stork lives in sympatry with jabiru and wood stork where the ranges of these three species overlap, especially in the Venezuelan llanos. Of all American stork species, the maguari stork has the smallest geographical range.

== Behavior and ecology ==
=== Feeding ===
This stork has a markedly broad diet and is considered to be a generalist compared to the sympatric wood stork and jabiru. It feeds on fish, frogs, eels, earthworms, invertebrates, insect larvae, snakes, freshwater crabs, small mammals such as rats, and bird eggs. More rarely, it may take smaller birds; as one case has shown where a large, intact rail was discovered in the gullet of an individual from Patagonia. Despite the maguari stork's apparently generalist diet, one study from Brazil has suggested that this stork may actively target worm lizards (Amphisbaena) as prey items. This may be because of the elongated body shape of such taxa that occupies a relatively small volume in the bird's stomach and hence can more compactly fit inside the stomach to optimise the bird's energy intake.

The maguari stork preferentially forages in shallow waters about 12 cm deep, and more rarely at water depths of up to 30 cm. This may be because shallow waters harbour higher numbers of prey taxa, or are high in dissolved carbon and nutrients. This species is primarily a visual forager. Its usual manner of hunting consists in walking slowly through wetlands with its bill close to the surface of the water, ready to seize any prey it comes into contact with. The bird breeds early during the seasonal rains while the water in the wetland habitat is still undisturbed by fresh rainwater, so that prey items are more visible through the water and success of prey capture, especially as food for nestlings, is higher. However, this stork has also been observed to grope with its bill in the water, although this may be more common toward the end of the breeding season when water bodies begin to dry up and become turbid.

Especially during the breeding season, the maguari stork forages solitarily or in pairs. However, it may also feed in larger aggregations outside the breeding season, often in association with other wading bird species. Because prey are concentrated in the shallowness of these pools, tactile foraging would be highly efficient in this situation.

Although the maguari stork largely depends on shallow freshwaters as a source of prey, it has also been observed to forage solitarily on dry plains outside the breeding season where mice and toads (candidate prey) sometimes occur in large numbers. It also forages on dry cultivated fields where invertebrates may have been disturbed. During the evenings in the dry season from December until April, individuals form large assemblages around low-lying water features where prey density is high but prey abundance is not. Notably numerous assemblages of foraging maguari storks have been sighted in the Brazilian municipality Quissama during the dry season in October, where they congregate around shallow pools in search of food. The maguari stork's tendency to forage in both wetlands and dry lands reflects its generalist nature, whereas specialists such as the jabiru depend more strongly on wetlands as a feeding ground and are sighted more frequently near to wetlands than the maguari stork.

In one study at half-hectare ponds in the llanos during the dry season, a flock of 90 maguari stork individuals were observed together with jabirus and wood storks. Because of limited prey, intra and interspecific competition inevitably occurs in such aggregations; often leading to kleptoparasitism. Maguari storks are mostly found to steal food amongst themselves, but jabirus also occasionally steal from them, taking large prey items such as eels.

The maguari stork has been observed uplifting cowhides in dry fields in search of potential invertebrate prey underneath. This occurs especially in the non-breeding season when large migratory flocks search for arthropods in the bushes and dry short grass. Some individuals also sometimes eat pieces of cow dung. Historically, one individual has been observed to swallow a cowhide whole.

Food brought to nestlings by their parents includes fish and eels, small mammals such as rats, and invertebrates. However, the proportions of these taxa differ between years depending on availability and the food brought to the nest for the young consists predominantly of aquatic organisms. Parents carry food to the nest as a large bolus in the throat. They regurgitate it onto the nest, whereupon it is picked up and eaten by the nestlings. Food is usually regurgitated in small parts for young nestlings, and as one large mass for older nestlings.

=== Breeding ===
Many aspects of the maguari stork's reproductive biology and nesting strategies are unique to this species and are absent in other stork species. Such differences in breeding and nesting habits have probably resulted from strong selection pressures that would have led this species to become adapted to survive in its open lowland wetland habitat that it originally invaded.

==== Nesting habits ====
Unlike other stork species, this stork is commonly found to nest on the ground, whereas many other stork species habitually nest at higher elevation. The nest always lies near to shallow water amongst tall grass and reeds, since aquatic organisms form the bulk of the nestlings' diet. The maguari stork's nest is also unusual in extensively comprising grass and reeds. Common species used in nest fabrication include the reed Cyperus giganteus and the marsh grass Zizianopsis bonariensis, alongside other aquatic plants in the families Polygonaceae and Solinaceae. Ground nests found in the southern parts of the maguari stork's range are one-meter-high (3.3 ft) conical structures measuring 1.5–2.5 m in basal diameter, tapering to a flat platform of 1–1.5 m at the top. The nest rises up to two feet above the surface of the water and its location is largely treeless. Hence overall, the maguari stork's nest seems to more closely resemble that of cranes and screamers such as the southern screamer Chauna torquata than that of other stork species.

In the Venezuelan llanos, the maguari stork is also found to nest in low, thick-trunked trees including Ficus pertusa and Randia venezuelansis. These nests comprise sticks that are usually less than a metre long and less than 2 cm in diameter, and often from the palm species Copernicia tectorum. Nevertheless, the species does not seem to naturally perch in trees because unlike its sympatric heterospecifics such as the jabiru, it cannot stand on its hallux. Therefore, it probably only nests opportunistically above the ground. The same nest may be used by a pair in successive years, sometimes for as long as seven years. However, ground nests composed of herbaceous plants usually disintegrate after a year, whereupon the same breeding pair returns to the nest site to rebuild the nest. Both partners participate in building and lining the nest, which continues throughout incubation and brooding. Nest lining usually begins when the base is about a metre wide, and lining material largely consists of wet grass that dries and hardens in the intense sun.

The maguari stork is primarily a colonial nester, although it also less frequently nests solitarily. Solitary nests are found to be less successful than colonial nests in terms of survival of the young, but survival rates in the former appear to be more consistent. Colonies typically consist of 5-15 nests, some of which are within 50 cm apart in tree colonies, but at different heights. One colony from a study on the llanos comprised as many as 40 nests. Colonial and solitary nesters also differ in the way they defend their nests. Colonial nesters are more aggressive than solitary nesters and physically attack intruders with bill jabbing. Contrarily, solitary nesters use a "lead-away" strategy, in which the nesting bird walks up behind the intruder with threatening bill clattering, and ceases to clatter its bill when the intruder moves away from the nest.

==== Courtship and nesting displays ====
Although colonial breeding is common amongst storks, the maguari stork differs in that courting takes place in congregations before established breeding pairs remove themselves to each of their nesting sites; whereas similar species such as the white stork and the oriental white stork court directly at the nest. These nuptial congregations in the maguari stork occur at freshwater marshes that have already been flooded with rainwater to a depth of about 20 cm and are the venue either for the formation of new pair-bonds in young individuals or for the reunion of mates from previous years. In the latter case however, it is unknown whether both mates enter the courtship assembly together or locate each other after each having migrated there separately.

This stork shows unique nesting behaviours not observed in many other storks and that may reflect its adaptation to nesting on the ground. For example, it is one of a minority of stork species to perform a distinct Nest Covering Display to protect nestlings from potential predators. During this display, the nesting stork droops its wings along its sides with a strongly cocked tail and erect feathers on the head and neck; accompanied by a clattering of the bill that is pointed almost vertically downward. Another nesting behaviour apparently unique to the maguari stork is the Mock Resting display. Here, during the presence of an intruder near the nest, the individual stands motionless with its back strongly arched, neck retracted, and wings and bill folded almost vertically downward. This behaviour likely evolved as an adaptation to ground nesting in dense vegetation because the posture maintained by the nesting bird amongst the grass and reeds may render it difficult to see by the intruder; and at the same time, the bird is poised ready to attack.

Although this stork shows many common courtship displays in storks, these behaviours seem to omit some of the vocal and visual features to be replaced by an augmented tactile element. This may be yet another reflection of this stork's adaptation to nesting on the ground; in that the subdued visual displays will less likely attract the attention of predators that detect prey by sight at close range; and although loud vocalisations would be useful for mates to attract each other's attention, this could also render them more conspicuous to potential ground predators.

==== Egg laying and nestlings ====
Breeding is highly synchronised with the onset of rain during the wet season, which usually lasts from May to November in the llanos of Venezuela. However, most breeding of the maguari stork happens from July to mid-September, which is earlier than breeding in both the sympatric wood stork and the jabiru. Individuals begin migration to the breeding grounds as the rains begin, although some individuals may migrate and arrive early just before the rains. Despite the lengthy wet season in the llanos, the nesting period in one year never lasts for over four months. Elsewhere in the stork's global range, the timing of the breeding season is slightly different and somewhat shorter. In north east Argentina for example, the breeding season extends from June to August; and in east central Argentina extends from July to October, with eggs probably being laid in late June and early July. On Mexiana Island in northern Brazil, the breeding season lasts only from August to September. The timing of onset of the seasonal rain is extremely variable across the maguari stork's global range, with rainfall beginning in some years as early as late March and others as late as June. The start of breeding is therefore correspondingly variable; and in Argentina, nesting may commence as late as August with late rains. In the llanos, breeders may lay eggs as early as late May following unusually early and heavy rainfall; whereas young breeders may lay eggs as late as October with late-arriving rain.

The clutch size is typically 3 or 4 eggs, with an average of 3.2 being reported. Eggs are laid on alternate days, so that hatching within clutches is highly asynchronous; with some young hatching up to a week apart. Incubation begins after the 2nd or 3rd egg is laid, is carried out by both parents, and lasts 29–32 days. The eggs are oval or subelliptical, and mean egg measurements are 75.19mm in length and 52.56mm in width; with maximum egg measurements of 77.4mm in length and 56.2mm in breadth having been recorded. The eggs are also said to be disproportionately small compared to the laying female's body mass.

Weight differences between different-aged siblings have been recorded as 500-1400 g. Egg laying is however highly synchronous between nests in a colony, so that relatively large groups of young from different nests fledge together in batches toward the end of the wet season. This may serve as an anti-predator strategy to dilute an individual's risk of being predated. As adults, male maguari storks become sexually mature at three years of age, and females at four years.

After three weeks of age, maguari stork nestlings develop defensive behaviour if their nest is approached by an intruder; which is not known for nestlings of other stork species. They crouch forward, partially spread their wings and erect the black feathers on their head, neck and back; followed by a shrill, rasping scream and an attempt to grab a persistent intruder with their bill. In many other stork species, akinesia lasts throughout much of the nestlings' early life, and the constantly white plumage makes them appear as eggs to potential chick predators. However, in maguari stork nestlings, akinesia ceases much earlier, and the unusual aggressiveness of the young has probably developed as a specialised anti-predator strategy in compensation for the young chicks' inability to leave the nest due to their slow-developing hallux and the vulnerable position of the nest on the ground. However, at 25–35 days old, the hallux is sufficiently developed to allow the chicks to leave ground nests in search of food. Chicks also occasionally beg for food from their parents outside the nest, but parents have never been observed to feed their young outside the nest.

There appears to be little sibling rivalry in maguari stork nestings, with most nestling mortality being due to young falling out of nests containing 3-4 chicks; and egg mortality primarily through predation appears to be higher than chick mortality.

The large congregations of maguari storks in the pre- and post-reproductive periods are considered a reliable indicator that this stork breeds locally in the area in which the groups are sighted.

== Threats and survival ==
The primary threats to this species are anthropogenic habitat disturbance and hunting for food. A common human disturbance occurs through habitat destruction via land reclamation from marshes for agriculture, which has occurred especially in southeast Brazil and may therefore evoke conservation concern for the species in this area. Claiming land for agriculture by digging canals, together with land filling and sewage discharges may also threaten dry-season foraging environments for maguari storks especially on the northern Rio de Janeiro coast. The maguari stork is vulnerable to nesting habitat destruction because it shows nest-site fidelity, and will continue to nest in the same place even after onset of recent anthropogenic disturbance. Use of pesticides may also adversely affect the health and breeding success of this species. The capture of individuals for food presents another survival threat and occurs particularly in the Southern Amazon and Venezuela.

Natural enemies of this stork include boa constrictors and crested caracaras (Polyborus plancus), both of which eat this species' eggs. Both of these predatory species can probably also eat maguari stork chicks that are no more than a few weeks old. Many other potential predators such as jaguars, spectacled caiman, broad-snouted caiman, Andean mountain cats, Geoffroy's cats, kodkods, margays, ocelots, oncillas, Pampas cats, southern tigrinas, jaguarundis, cougars, and maned wolves could also access ground nests. Although these animals are known to opportunistically feed on birds, no instances of predation on maguari storks have been hitherto recorded; but such predation is considered likely.

The maguari stork is potentially threatened in the Pantanal, which as well as being subject to considerable land reclamation for agriculture, has hosted increased operation of hydroelectric dams, especially in the Parana river basin. Dams retain much water during the dry season, so that natural water features downstream are more likely to dry out completely and thereby lead to a decrease in suitable foraging sites for this stork. Conversely, during the wet season, dams can lead to extensive flooding downstream caused by the release of a large volume of water at once that renders the storks' usual foraging grounds too deep for them to stand in.

== Relationship with humans ==
This stork has historically been kept in captivity in places such as London Zoo in the mid-1800s and Amsterdam Zoo in the late 1920s, where one individual survived beyond 21 years. Two cases of breeding have been recorded in captivity. A chick was hatched but not reared in Buenos Aires Zoo between 1946 and 1950. Five chicks, of which three survived, also hatched at Discovery Island at Disneyland Florida Resort in 1991. The parents were at least 18 years old when they first bred. In the wild, the maguari stork is considered a game bird in Amazonia.

== Status ==
The maguari stork is evaluated as being of least concern because it has an extremely large geographical range, and an apparently stable world population that is suspected to be very large. Despite local declines in some parts of its range, the population is not considered to be threatened on a global scale. However, even though this stork appears to be numerous throughout its natural habitat, census data are lacking and there appears to be no current estimate of the world population. This should be a new target of conservationists, and a clearer overview of this stork's world status could be aided by carrying out numerous aerial surveys of nesting areas.

This stork may be especially vulnerable in the llanos of Venezuela. Its population declined strongly there in recent past decades as of 1977 and less than 5000 individuals were estimated to live in this region through most of the 1980s. A potentially effective conservation strategy to help protect this stork's natural habitat in the llanos is the expansion and maintenance of cattle ranches in the savanna grassland matrix in preference to crop cultivation, since such ranches are similar in vegetational structure to natural grasslands. Another potentially useful conservation measure is the deployment of artificial nesting platforms to encourage nesting of maguari storks, as has been done for the white stork in Europe. Despite its relatively unthreatened overall status, the maguari stork should deserve closer global population monitoring to better safeguard it from future potential large-scale declines across its entire range.
