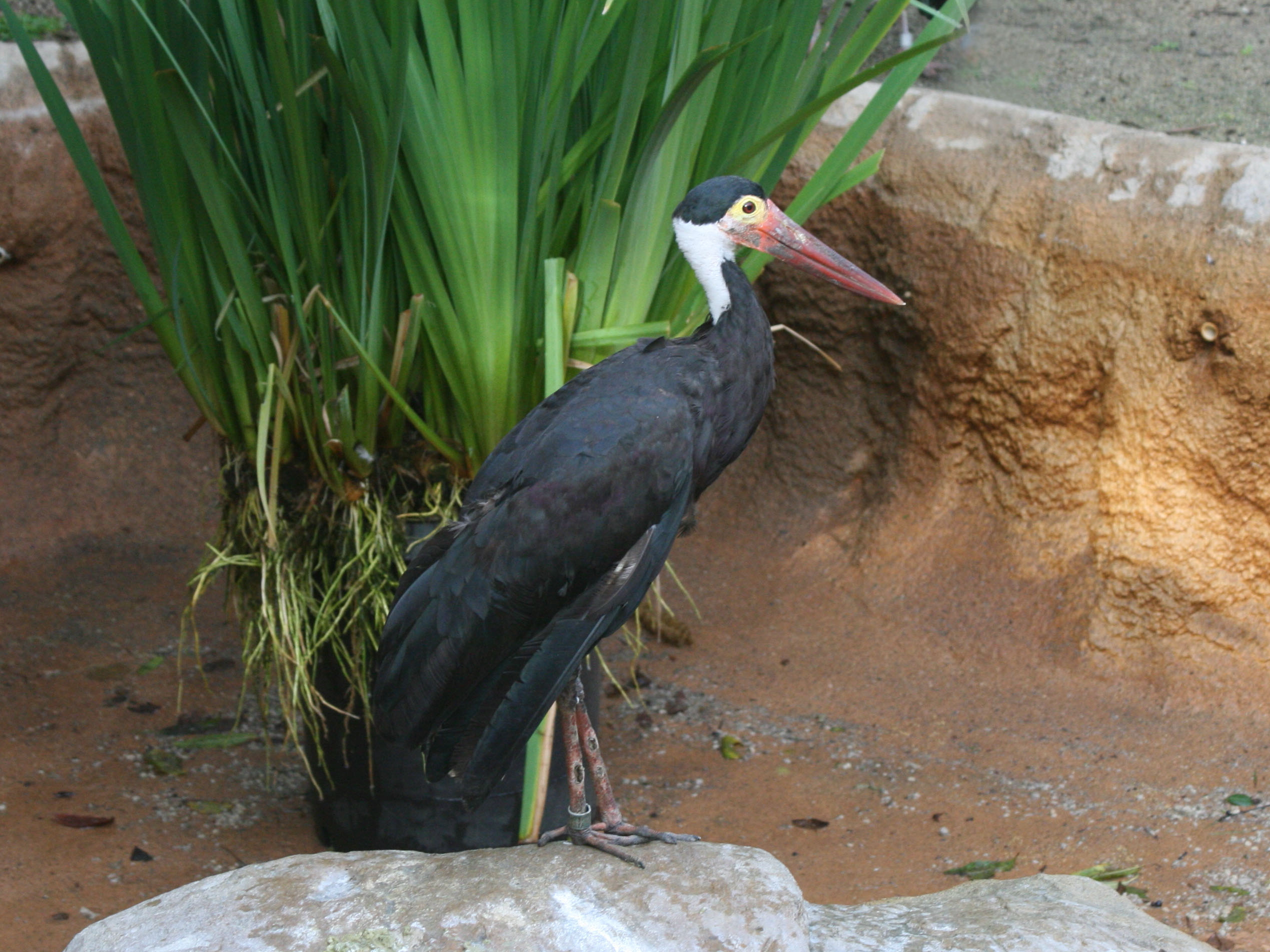
- At San Diego Zoo

Conservation status
- Endangered (IUCN 3.1)

Scientific classification
- Kingdom: Animalia
- Phylum: Chordata
- Class: Aves
- Order: Ciconiiformes
- Family: Ciconiidae
- Genus: Ciconia
- Species: C. stormi

Binomial name
- Ciconia stormi (Blasius, 1896)
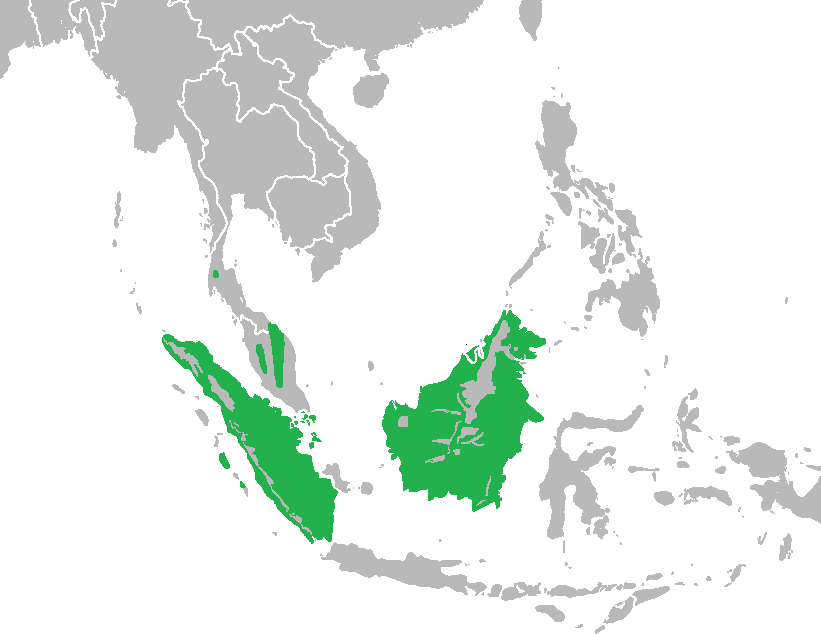
- Extant resident range

= Storm's stork =

Species of bird

Storm's stork (Ciconia stormi) is a medium-sized stork species that occurs primarily in lowland tropical forests of Malaysia, Indonesia and southern Thailand. It is considered to be the rarest of all storks, and is estimated to number at most 1,750 wild individuals across its geographic range. The population has long been in decline and the primary cause is widely considered to be deforestation of its native habitat.

== Taxonomy and systematics ==
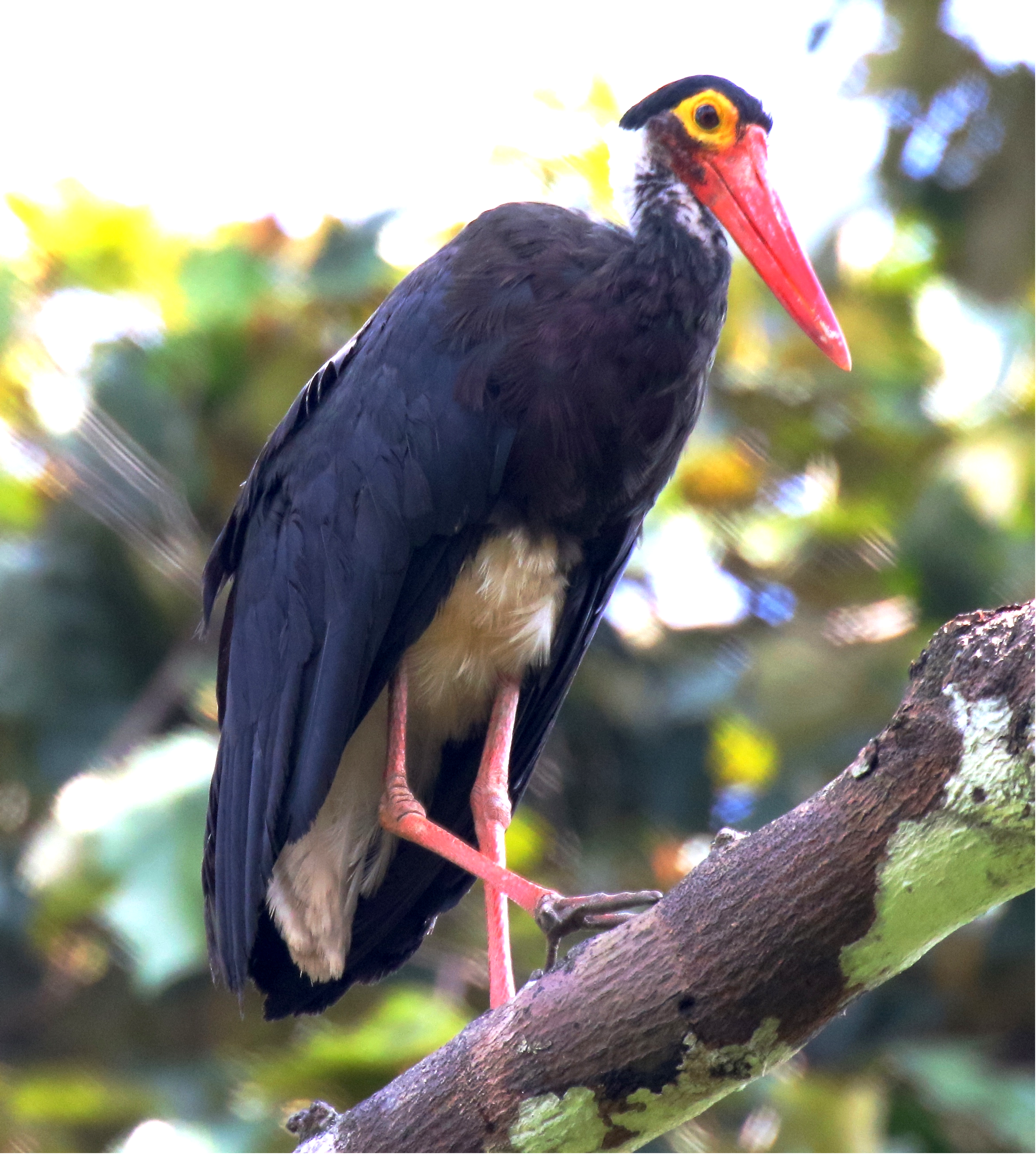
Sukau Rainforest Lodge, Kinabatangen River - Sabah, Borneo - Malaysia

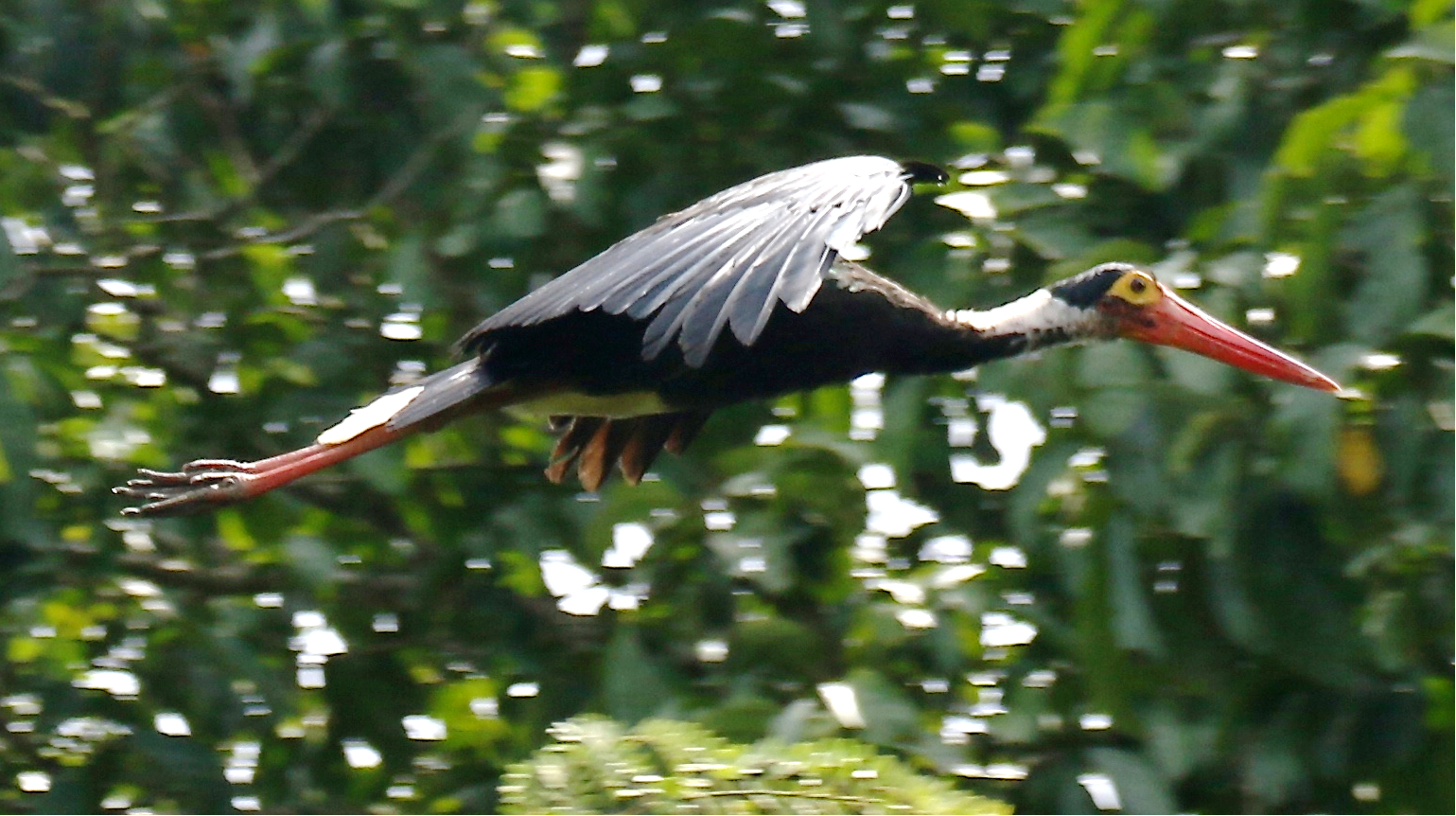
Sukau Rainforest Lodge, Kinabatangen River - Sabah, Borneo - Malaysia

This stork was first described by Blasius in 1896, and named after the German sea captain Hugo Storm, a collector of zoological specimens in the East Indies. In Thailand, it is known as "nok kra su um", which refers to the birds' fishing procedure by stalking along the bank of a stream in dense forest.

This species is very similar and closely related to the woolly-necked stork whose range partially overlaps with that of Storm's stork. Although Storm's stork has long been considered a separate species, it has also been previously treated as a subspecies of the woolly-necked stork in the more recent past. However, Storm's stork is characterised by a yellowish-orange facial skin patch around the eye that is absent in the woolly-necked stork; and the neck is black and white, whereas it is completely white in the woolly-necked stork. However, the specific distinguishing features of Storm's stork have been poorly known in the past, which in the field has frequently led to confusion with the woolly-necked stork.

These two species are also ecologically segregated, with Storm's stork keeping to dense forests and the woolly-necked stork mainly inhabiting open swamp, rice paddy, grassland and dry cultivated areas. There is evidence of sympatry of these two species in Sumatra, where both of these habitats are present. Further, phylogenetic analyses of the Ciconiidae based on a portion of cytochrome oxidase b gene have suggested with strong support that Storm's stork and the woolly-necked stork are sister species.

== Description ==
This medium-sized stork stands at 75–91 cm (30–36 in) tall and most of the plumage is black. The undertail coverts and the back of neck are white with a black cap. It has orange facial skin with a yellow ring surrounding the eye, a red iris, and a pinkish-red bill. On some but not all male individuals, the culmen of the bill is slightly concave with a basal knob.

The legs and feet of adults are dull red, but usually appear paler because they are often covered with the birds' excreta. The bill and other soft body parts darken in the breeding season. The sexes are similar in appearance, but as in all storks, the male appears slightly larger. It is also speculated from field observations that the male's black cap, chest and throat are slightly glossier.

The plumage of the chicks at 1–3 days old is completely white, accompanied by a black crown and a black bill with a yellow-orange tip. The legs, facial skin and gular pouch are initially light yellow; as the chicks age, the legs become pink, and the facial skin becomes dark grey. The iris is initially brown.

The chicks grow very fast, doubling in new-born size in just under a month. By this time, they have also begun to develop black feathers on their wings, throats and bodies. After 30 days, the areas of black feathering have increased, and the black chest and wing coverts are streaked with glossy green and bronze-red. After 45 days, the young resemble adults, but they are still smaller with shorter, dark-tipped bills and paler skin colourations, and the blackness of their plumage is slightly duller. The chicks become fully feathered after 52–57 days. Wild young have been reported to leave the nest after about 60 days, and individuals in captivity can usually fly after 90 days.

The adult birds are generally silent outside the breeding season; however, during the breeding season they utter vocalisations that have been transcribed as "Kurau". In captivity, one adult individual was heard making a quiet sibilant whistling. Chicks have been heard to make a relatively loud froglike begging call when parents return to the nest with food.

== Distribution and habitat ==
The bulk of the world population of this stork occurs on Borneo; occurring in Kalimantan (Indonesia), Swarak, Sabah (Malaysia) and Brunei. It is also found throughout Sumatra, although its range there was previously considered to be restricted to the south east. Despite being widespread on both of these islands, the population occurs at low densities and only one or a few individuals have ever been sighted together, with the largest number being 12 during an observation in Brunei. Smaller numbers live in some parts of peninsular Malaysia, where it appears to be particularly rare. An even smaller minority lives in the extreme south of Thailand, but this stork very unlikely occurs elsewhere in Thailand due to the near absence of remaining suitable habitat.

In 1986, the first nest of this species ever known to science was discovered in Southern Thailand. However, the construction of the Chiew Larn Dam in the same year led to destruction of much of this stork's lowland forest habitat through extensive flooding. Following the flooding, Storm's stork was therefore believed to no longer breed there and since then was previously considered extinct in Thailand. However, this stork was re-sighted in Southern Thailand in 2004 with infrared camera traps; but continues to be exceptionally uncommon given that usually only one individual has been sighted at a time despite the high intensity of camera trapping. Nevertheless, its persistence in Southern Thailand does suggest the presence of a small breeding population.

This stork's habitat is primarily dense lowland riverine forest and peat swamp forest, at altitudes not exceeding 240 metres above sea level. The density of large trees in this habitat exceeding 10 cm at breast height is estimated to range from 500 to 800 trees per hectare, and typical tree genera include Dipterocarpus and Ficus. The forest undergrowth predominantly comprises rattans, bamboos, shrubs and climbers. Because these habitats are largely inaccessible to humans, collecting data on this species is logistically difficult, which may partly explain why little is known about this stork's natural history.

Although Storm's stork accepts both lowland riverine forest and peat swamp forest, it is currently unknown which of these habitats provide optimal living conditions for the species. However, peat-swamp forest does appear to be an underestimated, ecologically important habitat for this stork across much of its range. In the wake of continued anthropogenic loss of lowland riverine forest, peat-swamp forest possibly provides an important refuge for the species and an extensive area of peat swamp forest occurs in West Kalimantan. However, this forest habitat is also under threat through conversion to palm oil plantations, logging and forest fires, so that increased conservation efforts should be directed on protecting peat-swamp forest.

This species has been shown to be somewhat tolerant of logged forests; however, these areas' actual value as a breeding habitat for this species is disputed. Danielsen and Heegaard have considered Storm's stork incapable of breeding in logged forests despite apparent short term survival. In any case, current records have been too short to demonstrate long-term value of logged forests to this stork species. The acceptance of logged forests by Storm's stork may also entail some caveats; for example, that there must invariably be easy access within logged forest to freshwater margins, and that at least 20 years of forest regeneration should be allowed to elapse before real habitat value is re-established. A local mosaic of primary and logged forest may also explain this species' apparent persistence in logged forest, because it may rely on the undisturbed forest patches as a refuge to sustain itself in the logged forest patches.

This stork is often seen soaring at great heights over rivers and forest clearings, and like many other storks utilises thermals to assist it in gliding. This behaviour is said to be "contagious" because when one individual begins to soar, conspecifics join it in flight; with flocks consisting of up to six individuals. On Borneo, it has also been reported on open, grassy freshwater swamps and paddy fields. It appears to never frequent saline habitats, but occasionally uses forested inland areas adjacent to bodies of water subject to tidal movements and near mangrove swamps.

== Behaviour and ecology ==
=== Breeding ===
Two major breeding records of this species have been made; in southern Thailand in 1986, and in swamp forest in southern Sumatra in 1989. However, chicks in the Thailand breeding record were first observed in October and those in Sumatra were first observed in early June. The differing recorded times of egg laying in this species therefore does not suggest a strict breeding season. Collective breeding records of this species are currently scant possibly because nests are difficult to accurately locate in the dense forest habitat.

The nest is usually located 19–30 m (62–98 ft) above ground above riverbanks, often in the forks of trees of Dipterocarpus species. At south Sumatra, a Storm's stork nest was studied that lay 8.3 m (27 ft) above ground in an 18 m (59 ft)-tall Rhizosphora mucronata tree. In captivity, both the male and female have been observed to carry out nest-building activities. The nest has an external outer diameter measuring between 30 and 50 cm; with a depth of 10–15 cm (3.9–5.9 in), and is typically composed of twigs and sticks mainly belonging to tree species in the genus Rhizosphora, but also from species in the families Loranthaceae, Dipterocarpaceae, and Rubinaceae. These sticks measure 15–60 cm (5.9–23.6 in) in length and 0.5–1.5 cm (0.20–0.59 in) in diameter. The nest interior is lined with soft material such as grass and down. 2–4 cm (0.79–1.57 in) long leaflets from Xylocarpus species have also been identified as nest material, and these plants have been found growing in the area surrounding the nest. The same nest is often used by a pair over consecutive years; whereby both mates add more material to the nest each year.

Male-female pairs of this species are typically monogamous. Both parents attend to the young at the nest, but only one parent at a time is usually present; with the female estimated to spend three times as long alone at the nest as the male. In the early stages of the chicks' life, both parents have been observed to roost at or near the nest during the evening; but within a month only the female continues to roost at or near the nest. Contrary to previous assertions, this species actually appears to breed solitarily and does not nest in colonies. However, it is sometimes found to roost communally, and several individuals have been observed roosting in tops of tall swamp trees a few kilometres from the nests.

Two eggs are usually laid per year, and the incubation period has been estimated at 29 days, with both parents alternately incubating the eggs. In captivity, the clutch size may range between two and four. The young are fully fledged 90 days after hatching. The only egg of this species to have been measured was an infertile one extracted from a nest containing two hatched chicks in south Sumatra in 1989. This egg measured 60.1 mm (2.37 in) in length and 41.9 mm (1.65 in) in breadth, and was completely white after cleaning. This egg is preserved at the Zoological Museum of Bogor, Indonesia, and is currently the only egg specimen available for this species.

Pairs of this stork species perform impressive aerial courtship displays in which both partners do flips in flight, with the lower birds presenting its feet to the upper. Both birds also occasionally glide at high altitudes with level wings and dangling legs. At the nest, they perform bill clattering activities that are typical of many species in the Ciconiidae.

In captivity, another courtship display has been observed in which both partners face each other on the ground or on the nest, extend their wings outward from the body, and bow to each other repeatedly. This display continues until the male approaches the female and attempts to copulate with her, although copulation does not actually follow from most such displays. This display also sometimes continues when breeding is finished and chicks are at the nest. However, the importance of this display in wild populations is unknown, since both parents have been sighted together at the nest for only 2% of the time from observations.

=== Food and feeding ===
Storm's stork feeds primarily on small fish, frogs, aquatic insect larvae, and sometimes earthworms. These are also the food items brought by both parents back for their young at the nest; with the fish measuring 5–7 cm (2.0–2.8 in) long and weighing 10–30 g (0.35–1.06 oz), and the worms measuring 10–15 cm (3.9–5.9 in) long. The parents regurgitate the food into the bottom of the nest, whereupon it is picked up and swallowed by the chicks. During a series of nest observations in southern Sumatra in 1989, adults were found to return to the nest with food for the chicks every 2–4 hours in June; but in July, food was brought to the nest less often and significantly more frequently in the late afternoons. In Sabah, they have also been reported to feed on grasshoppers and possibly crabs. Hence, other food taxa may be similar to those of the woollynecked stork, but more data are required to fully confirm this, .

This stork typically forages stealthily with slow, deliberate movements and a retracted neck along muddy banks of rivers and creeks within dense primary forest; keeping primarily to the shaded areas. Individuals with chicks usually forage 2–3 km from the nest. It will also use other freshwater bodies as foraging localities with high densities of fish and freshwater invertebrates. These include small pools, trackside puddles, swamps and oxbow lakes; and Storm's stork may be able to use these features optimally where they occur in a patchwork arrangement on riparian floodplains. It can also use boggy clearings created by ungulates such as gaur that trample vegetation to access mineral licks. In contrast, deep, fast-flowing rivers and waterways are avoided by this species due to reduced prey availability and its inability to stand in these waters.

In Sabah, they have been found feeding on open ground that has recently been burnt. They probably catch invertebrates that have been disturbed or killed by the fire.

=== Threats and survival ===
The primary threat to this species is degradation of its lowland forest habitat through deforestation for logging and conversion to oil palm plantations. For example, approximately two thirds of the swamp forests in South Sumatra were logged from 1982 to 1997. Kalimantan lost almost 25% of its evergreen forest during 1985-1997 and all of Sumatra almost 30% of its 1985 cover. The relative extent of destruction of this species' habitat may be particularly high because clearance of lowland forests typically occurs first in deforestation schemes due to the relative ease of approach and the presence of high-quality timber. Extensive habitat destruction has also occurred through flooding of lowland forest following the construction of reservoirs, as epitomised by the Chiew Larn Dam project in Southern Thailand. Because this stork is a lowland specialist, high-elevation forest remaining intact after destruction and fragmentation of lowland habitat is unsuitable, so that transmigration to higher altitude forests is unlikely to be a viable escape solution.

Storm's stork is possibly not strongly directly affected by habitat fragmentation through deforestation. It may actually be somewhat tolerant of fragmentation because it could fly great distances in search of new habitat and be relatively unaffected by the open land matrix which it overflies. However, this is probably not a favourable situation for the species, and the exact maximum distances it will travel to reach new habitat are currently unknown. A larger impact of deforestation on Storm's stork is more likely to be the decrease in freshwater faunal prey abundance and diversity resulting from increased sedimentation, nutrient loads and water temperatures after logging. This loss of freshwater taxa would in turn decrease food availability for this stork at its foraging sites. Road building through the forests to access logging areas creates similar problems by contributing to soil erosion, thereby also decreasing freshwater prey diversity. The large canopy gaps created through logging also lead to drier abiotic conditions in the cleared areas than under dense canopy, which would render these areas unsuitable for food taxa of Storm's stork such as amphibians and invertebrates that require wet substrates to live on. This is another likely contributor to the decrease in food taxa abundance after forest clearing.

A secondary threat to this species is hunting by humans. Hunting of this species by local people for food may have been happening before large-scale human encroachment onto its habitat to exploit the land. However, extensive land exploitation increases human activities that attract non-native hunters to these areas, so that hunting of this species through direct persecution has also appeared to increase as a side-effect of the direct impacts of habitat destruction. This was probably the case during extensive flooding of lowland forest in Southern Thailand during the Chiew Larn Dam project. This species is also extremely sensitive to human intrusions. If humans come within sight of the nest, the adult abandons the nest and does not return until 2–3 hours after the intruder departs. Anthropogenic noise sources such as from motorboats and chainsaws may also affect this stork; in response to such noises that penetrate the forest matrix, adult birds have been observed to press their head and body into the nest with only the eyes showing.

Natural enemies of chicks and nesting adults are believed to include raptors such as crested serpent eagles Spilornis cheela, monkeys and corvids. If these organisms approach the nest, the parent spreads its wings over the nestlings to protect them. This nest covering display is similar to that observed in the maguari stork.

Another minor threat is the capture of individuals for the international zoo trade, which increased markedly in the late 1980s. Although captivity of Storm's storks may be a solution to support the global population, these birds may be unsuitable to reintroduce to their natural habitat because they have become too tame. In Singapore, the price of this species on bird markets doubled ($300 to $600) in the early 1990s. However, there is no evidence that they have international trade value.

== Relationship to humans ==
This stork is sometimes hunted for food, either by native forest dwellers or non-natives who have been attracted to the area by large-scale land exploitation projects. Although there is a relatively low human population density in areas of undisturbed forest habitat of this species, these people concentrate on gleaning forest products and poaching wildlife. During these activities, Storm's storks are occasionally caught for food either directly by people who extract latex from the jelutong tree, or in baited traps for the monitor lizard Varanus serator.

Individuals of this species have appeared in many zoological institutions such as in Kuala Lumpur in Malaysia and Walsrode in Germany. However, the only two zoos where this species has successfully bred are Zoo Negara, Malaysia; and San Diego Wild Animal Park, California.

== Status ==
The population of this notably rare species has been thought to be in recent rapid decline, primarily due to clearance of its natural habitat to make way for oil palm plantations and logging activities. It has probably never been common, even before extensive habitat destruction from increased anthropogenic land exploitation.

It has been classified as Endangered on the IUCN Red List since 1994. The total population, as of 2023, is estimated to number 300-1,750 mature, wild individuals. Of these individuals, less than 10 are estimated to live in Myanmar, and a further 10 in Malaysia; In Indonesia, 50–100 are believed to live on Sumatra, and the largest remaining population by far is expected to live on Borneo. The size of this population has not been satisfactorily estimated, and may be anywhere between 240–1,600 mature individuals. This species is legally protected in Indonesia, Sarawak and Thailand. Although such protection has previously not been rigorously enforced, this stork has been recorded in numerous protected areas throughout its range, especially in Kalimantan, on Sumatra and in Malaysia.

This species requires extensive areas of dense lowland forest over which to forage, so that the best solution to protect this species from extinction would be the large-scale establishment of protected areas holding undisturbed lowland forest and riparian features. However, because this stork is very secretive, it has proved difficult to investigate its biology and ecology. Although it is almost certainly negatively affected by deforestation, little continues to be known about the exact extent of its responses to anthropogenic changes in its native habitat.

== Gallery ==
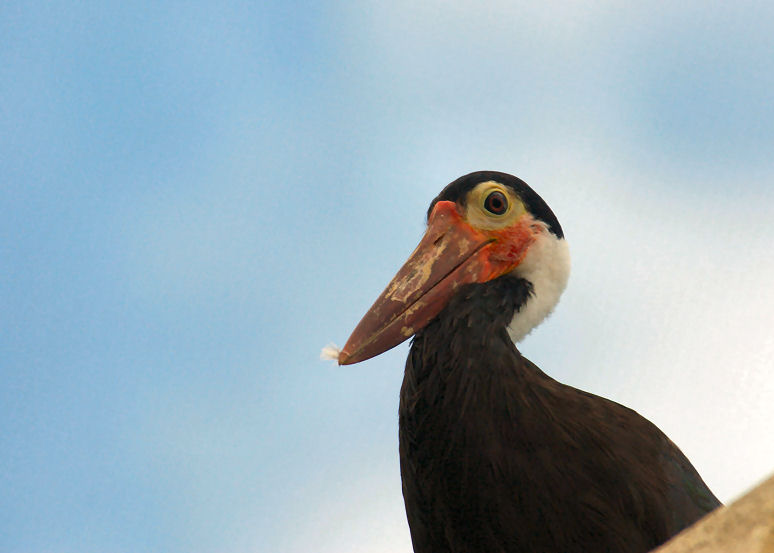
At Zoo Miami

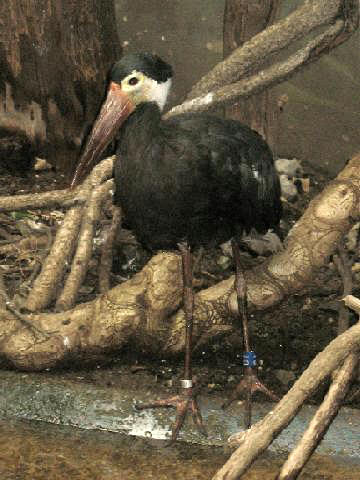

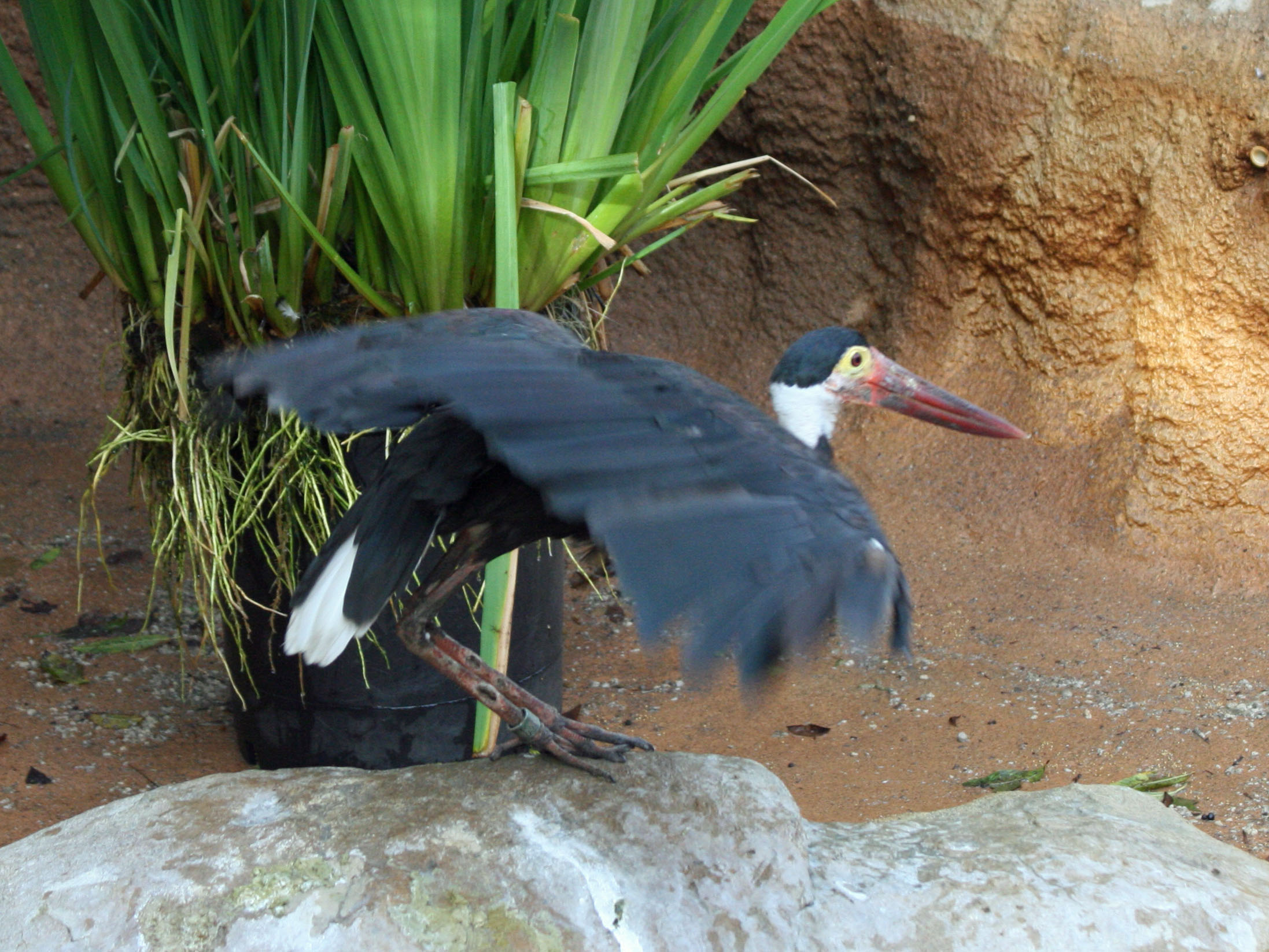
At San Diego Zoo

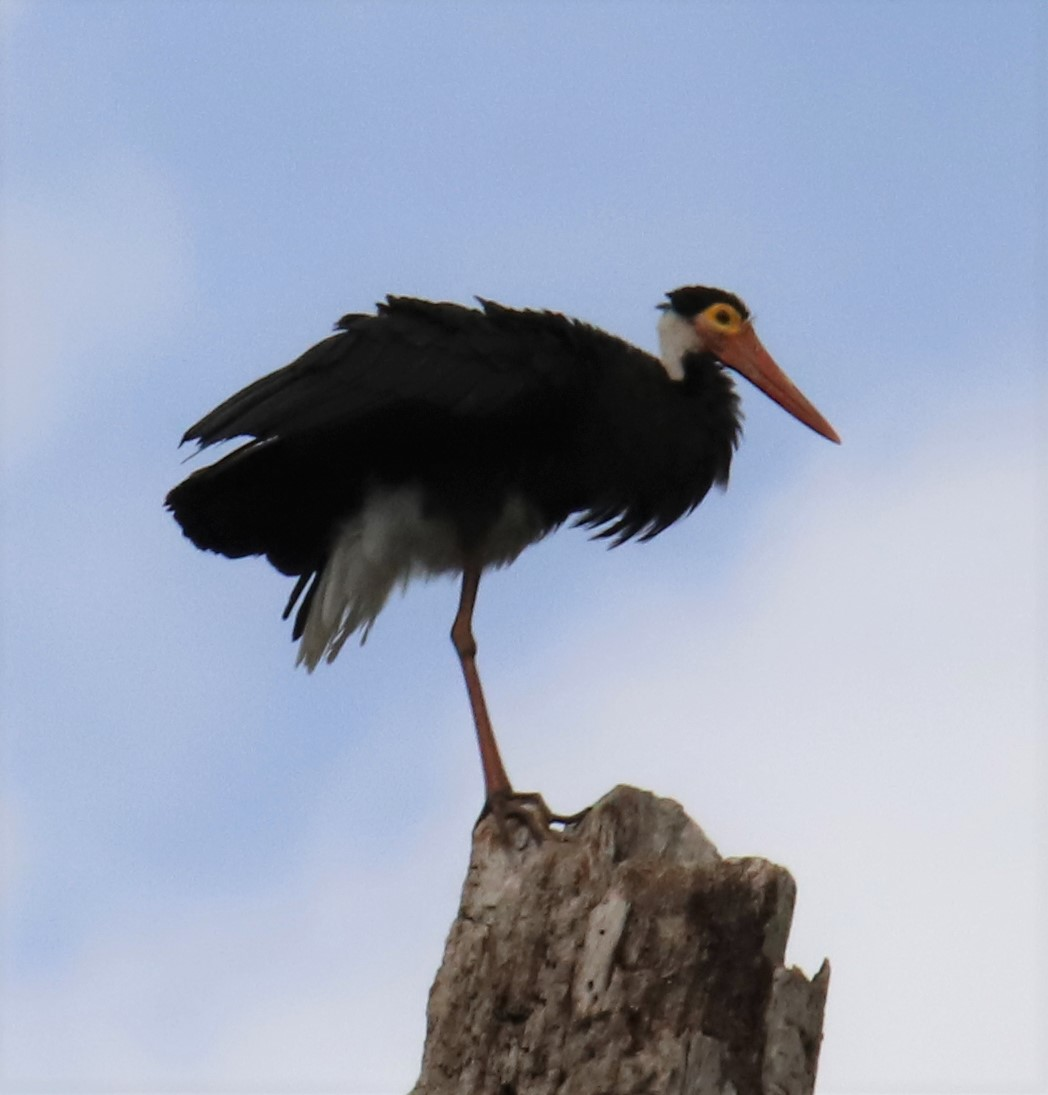
Storm's Stork, Kalimantan province of Borneo
