= Ciconia louisebolesae =

Ciconia louisebolesae Temporal range: Late Oligocene to Early Miocene, 26–15.97 Ma

Scientific classification
- Domain: Eukaryota
- Kingdom: Animalia
- Phylum: Chordata
- Class: Aves
- Order: Ciconiiformes
- Family: Ciconiidae
- Genus: Ciconia
- Species: †C. louisebolesae

Binomial name
- †Ciconia louisebolesae Boles, 2005

Extinct species of stork

Ciconia louisebolesae is an extinct species of stork from the Late Oligocene to Early Miocene of Australia. It was described by Walter Boles from fossil material found at the Riversleigh World Heritage Area, in the Boodjamulla National Park of north-western Queensland.

== History and naming ==
Remains of a stork from Oligo-Miocene deposits at Riversleigh were first reported in 1991, and later briefly mentioned in 1997. The material was subsequently described in 2005, emerging from an examination by Walter Boles on Australian fossil storks. The author assigned the material to a new species of Ciconia. The holotype specimen (QM F30290) is a fragment of the right humerus collected from the Bitesantennary Site. In addition, a partial skull, hindlimbs and a vertebra from other sites were also referred to the species.

The specific epithet refers to Louise Boles, the describer's mother, to whom the description is dedicated.

== Description ==
The eye sockets of C. louisebolesae are broad and round in appearance. Its cervical vertebrae are similar in size and appearance to those of modern storks. The ventral condyle on the humerus is proportionally smaller than that of other storks. The ventral epicondyle is located more towards the distal end of the humerus. Extensive and deeply excavated muscle scars are present below the ventral epicondyle. In rear view, the posterodorsal corner of the humerus is rounded. Similar to the Maguari stork, the crest supporting the attachment of the bicep muscle (crista bicipitalis) is exceptionally large. The tibiotarsus of C. louisebolesae most closely resembles that of small species of Ciconia in terms of its size and narrowness of the incisura tibialis. It was a fairly large stork, being within the size range of the modern black stork and white stork.

== Paleobiology ==
C. louisebolesae is known from both Late Oligocene and Early Miocene sites at the Riversleigh World Heritage Area, making it the oldest record of storks in Australia. Riversleigh, during the late Oligocene, was covered in temperate woodlands, with shallow wetlands also being present. These habitats would later be replaced by rainforests and forest pools in the early Miocene. A number of other birds were found in the same deposits as C. louisebolesae, including passerines, rails, dromornithids (like Barawertornis) and the casuariid Emuarius.

=== Taphonomy ===
The holotype specimen of C. louisebolesae was retrieved from the Bitesanntennary Site, which represents a cave-fill deposit. These range from its carcass being washed into the cave from outside to falling in after the roof of the cave collapsed in on itself.
