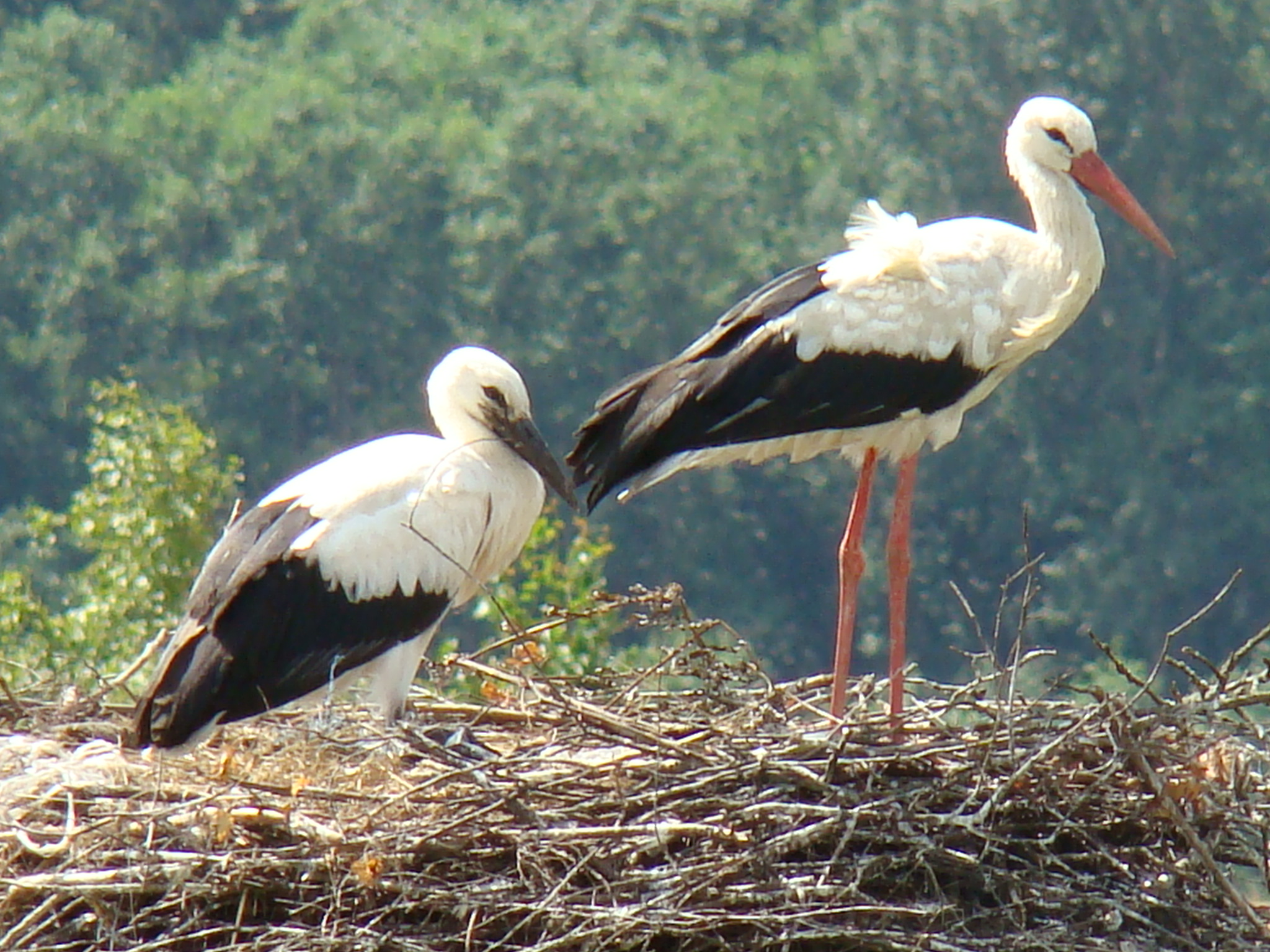
- Fledgling (left) and adult European white stork (Ciconia ciconia ciconia)

Scientific classification
- Kingdom: Animalia
- Phylum: Chordata
- Class: Aves
- Order: Ciconiiformes
- Family: Ciconiidae
- Genus: Ciconia; Brisson, 1760

Type species
- Ardea ciconia Linnaeus, 1758

Species
- Ciconia abdimii Ciconia boyciana Ciconia ciconia Ciconia episcopus Ciconia maguari Ciconia microscelis Ciconia nigra Ciconia stormi

Synonyms
- Dissoura Euxenura Sphenorhynchus

= Ciconia =

Ciconia Temporal range: Early Miocene to present

Genus of birds

Ciconia (/sɪˈkoʊ.ni.ə/ sih-KOH-nee-uh; Classical Latin: [kiˈkoː.ni.a]) is a genus of birds in the stork family. Six of the seven living species occur in the Old World, but the maguari stork has a South American range. In addition, fossils suggest that Ciconia storks were somewhat more common in the tropical Americas in prehistoric times.

The genus was introduced by the French zoologist Mathurin Jacques Brisson in 1760 with the white stork (Ciconia ciconia) as the type species. The genus name is the Latin word for "stork", and was originally recorded in the works of Horace and Ovid.

The Abdim's stork is the smallest of the family, but other species in the genus are generally medium-sized storks, with long legs and a long thick bill. The members of this genus are more variable in plumage than other stork genera, but all species are black (at least to the wings) and white (at least underparts or neck). Juveniles are a duller, browner version of the adult.

Depending on species, breeding can be in solitary pairs or colonies. Pairs usually stay together for life. They typically build large stick nests in trees, although the Abdim's stork sometimes will nest on cliffs, the maguari stork will nest on the ground and at least three species will construct their nests on human habitations. One of these, the white stork, is probably the best known of all storks, with a wealth of legend and folklore associated with this familiar summer visitor to Europe.

These storks feed on frogs, insects, fish, crustaceans, small birds, lizards and rodents. They fly with the neck outstretched, like most other storks, but unlike herons which retract their neck in flight.

The migratory species like the white stork and the black stork soar on broad wings and rely on thermals of hot air for sustained long distance flight. Since thermals only form over land, these storks, like large raptors, must cross the Mediterranean Sea at the narrowest points, and many of these birds can be seen going through the Straits of Gibraltar and the Bosphorus on migration.

== Species ==
=== Extant species ===
The genus contains eight extant species:

Genus Ciconia – Brisson, 1760 – eight species
Common name	Scientific name and subspecies	Range	Size and ecology	IUCN status and estimated population
Abdim's stork	Ciconia abdimii Lichtenstein, MHC, 1823	Widespread in open habitats of Sub-Saharan Africa, and in Yemen. Breeds in northern half of range and spends non-breeding period in southern half	Size: Habitat: Diet:	LC
Asian woolly-necked stork	Ciconia episcopus (Boddaert, 1783) Two subspecies: C. e. episcopus (Boddaert, 1783); C. e. neglecta (Finsch, 1904)	Southern Asia, from Pakistan to Indonesia and the Philippines	Size: Habitat: Diet:	NT
Storm's stork	Ciconia stormi (Blasius, 1896)	Borneo, Sumatra and the Thai-Malay Peninsula	Size: Habitat: Diet:	EN
Black stork	Ciconia nigra (Linnaeus, 1758)	Breeds from Eastern Asia (Siberia and northern China) west to Central and Southern Europe. Winters in South, Southeast and East Asia, and in tropical Africa. A resident (non-migratory) population in southern Africa	Size: Habitat: Diet:	LC
Maguari stork	Ciconia maguari (Gmelin, JF, 1789)	Widespread in open wetland habitats in northern, central and southern South America	Size: Habitat: Diet:	LC
African woolly-necked stork	Ciconia microscelis GR Gray, 1848	tropical Africa	Size: Habitat: Diet:	LC
White stork	Ciconia ciconia (Linnaeus, 1758) Two subspecies: C. c. ciconia; C. c. asiatica	Breeds in Europe to central Asia, and in northern Africa. Winters in Sub-Saharan Africa and South Asia	Size: Habitat: Diet:	LC
Oriental stork	Ciconia boyciana R. Swinhoe, 1873	Breeds in Russian Far East and northeast China. Winters in Japan, Korean Peninsula, east-central and southeast China, and Taiwan	Size: Habitat: Diet:	EN

=== Fossils ===
The fossil record of the genus is extensive, indicating that Ciconia storks were once more widespread than they are today. Although the known material tends to suggest that the genus evolved around the Atlantic, possibly in western Europe or Africa, the comparative lack of fossil sites in Asia makes this assumption not well-founded presently. All that can be said is that by the Early Pliocene, Ciconia was widespread at least all over the Northern Hemisphere.

Fossil members of the genus include:

- Ciconia louisebolesae (Early Miocene of Riversleigh, Australia)
- ?Ciconia minor (Early Miocene of Rusinga Island, Kenya)
- ?Ciconia sarmatica (Late Miocene of Credinţa, Romania)
- ?Ciconia gaudryi (Late Miocene/Early Pliocene of Pikermi, Greece)
- Ciconia sp. 1 (Late Miocene/Early Pliocene of Lee Creek Mine, the United States)
- Ciconia sp. 2 (Late Miocene/Early Pliocene of Lee Creek Mine, the United States)
- ?Ciconia kahli (Early Pliocene of South Africa)
- Ciconia lucida (Mongolian stork), (Middle Pliocene of Mongolia)
- Ciconia maltha (asphalt stork or La Brea stork), (Late Pliocene – Late Pleistocene of the western and southern United States, Cuba, and Bolivia)
- Ciconia stehlini (Late Pliocene – Early Pleistocene of Hungary) – may belong to extant species
- Ciconia nana (Australian stork) – (Early to Middle Pliocene, Late Pleistocene of Australia) – formerly Xenorhynchus
- Ciconia sp. (Late Pleistocene/Early Holocene of Las Breas de San Felipe, Cuba)

A distal radius in Late Pleistocene deposits of San Josecito Cavern (Mexico) may belong in this genus or in Mycteria; it is smaller than that of any known American stork, Ciconia or otherwise. The proposed fossil genus Prociconia from Brazil, also of Late Pleistocene age, may be a junior synonym of either this genus or Jabiru. A distal tarsometatarsus found in a rock shelter on Réunion was probably of a bird taken there as food by early settlers; no known account mentions the presence of storks on the Mascarenes, and while this subfossil was initially believed to be from a stork, it is today assigned to the Réunion ibis (Threskiornis solitarius) which is quite similar to storks osteologically and was not yet described when the bone was discovered (Cowles, 1994).
