= Woolly-necked stork =

The woolly-necked stork has been split into two species:

- Asian woolly-necked stork, Ciconia episcopus
- African woolly-necked stork, Ciconia microscelis
