= Ciconia nana =

Ciconia nana Temporal range: Early Pliocene to Middle Pliocene, 5.3–2.6 Ma

Scientific classification
- Kingdom: Animalia
- Phylum: Chordata
- Class: Aves
- Order: Ciconiiformes
- Family: Ciconiidae
- Genus: Ciconia
- Species: †C. nana

Binomial name
- †Ciconia nana (De Vis, 1888); Rich & van Tets, 1982; Boles, 2005

Synonyms
- Xenorhynchus nanus De Vis, 1888

Extinct species of bird

Ciconia nana is an extinct species of stork from the Pliocene of Australia. It was originally described in 1888 by De Vis as Xenorhynchus nanus, based on fossil material from the Condamine River, near Chinchilla, in the Darling Downs region of Queensland. Additional material subsequently came from Cooper Creek in the eastern Lake Eyre Basin of northeastern South Australia. The form was provisionally transferred to Ciconia in 1982 and redescribed in 2005.
