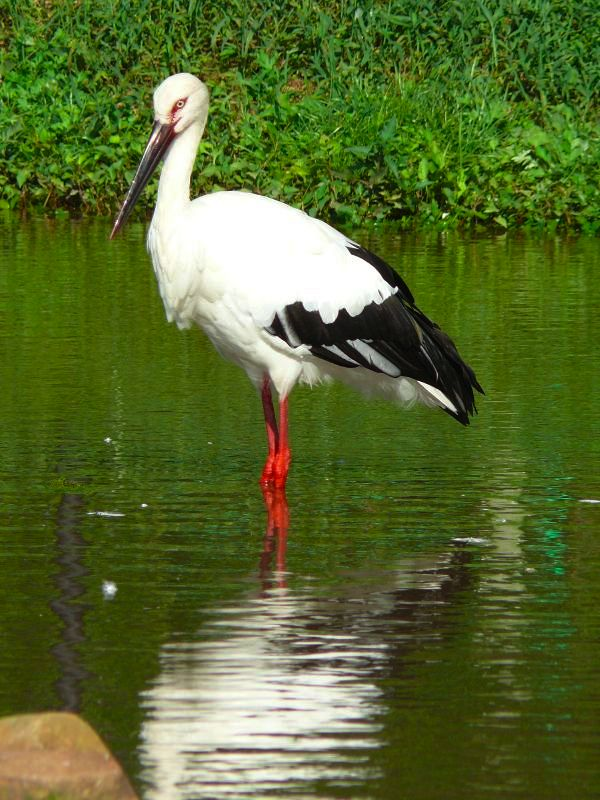

Conservation status
- Endangered (IUCN 3.1)
- CITES Appendix I

Scientific classification
- Kingdom: Animalia
- Phylum: Chordata
- Class: Aves
- Order: Ciconiiformes
- Family: Ciconiidae
- Genus: Ciconia
- Species: C. boyciana

Binomial name
- Ciconia boyciana R. Swinhoe, 1873
- Distribution map of Oriental stork Yellow: breeding Blue: non breeding

= Oriental stork =

Species of bird

The Oriental stork (Ciconia boyciana; traditional Chinese: 東方白鸛; simplified Chinese: 东方白鹳; pinyin: dōngfāng bái guàn; Japanese: 鸛 Kōnotori; Korean: 황새 Hwangsae) is a large, white bird with black-feathered wings in the stork family Ciconiidae.

== Taxonomy ==
The species was first described by Robert Swinhoe in 1873. It is closely related to and resembles the European white stork (C. ciconia), of which it was formerly often treated as a subspecies.

== Description ==
It is typically larger than the white stork, at 100–129 cm (39.5–51 in) long, 110–150 cm (43–59 in) tall, a weight of 2.8–5.9 kg (6.2–13.0 lb) and a wingspan of 2.22 m (7.3 ft). Unlike its more widespread cousin, the Oriental stork has red skin around its eye, with a whitish iris and black bill. Both sexes are similar. The female is slightly smaller than the male. The young are white with orange bills.

== Distribution and habitat ==
The Oriental stork is found in Japan, China, Korea and Siberia. It was formerly extirpated from Japan and the Korean Peninsula as a breeding species but is being reintroduced in both Japan and South Korea.

In May 2007 a wild hatchling was reported in Japan for the first time in 40 years. It was an offspring of two storks who were bred in captivity and released.

Reintroduction is ongoing in South Korea, centered around Yesan; the first wild-born chicks were hatched in 2016 from captive-hatched and released parents, and reproduction in the wild has been recorded on an annual basis since then, with a wild population of around 130 birds as of 2026.

== Conservation ==
Due to habitat loss and overhunting, the Oriental stork is classified as endangered on the IUCN Red List of Threatened Species. It is listed on Appendix I of CITES. There have been efforts to reintroduce the storks to the wild, but there must be changes to the environment first. The storks were harshly impacted by the growth of the rice industry and the subsequent use of pesticides. There is a push for rice farmers to grow their plants organically so that the storks may breed and grow safely in their environments. A chromosome-scale reference genome sequenced for the species showed a relatively high genetic diversity, which is considered to indicate that the population has a strong genetic capacity to recover from declines.

== Diet and behaviour ==
The Oriental stork is a solitary bird except during the breeding season. It likes to wade in marshes, pond's edges, coastal beaches, and other wetlands. These birds are apex predator in their habitat. Its diet consists mainly of fish, frog, insects, small birds and reptiles, as well as rodents.

=== Breeding ===
The female usually lays between two and six eggs. After breeding, the storks migrate to eastern China in September and return in March.

== See also ==
- List of Special Places of Scenic Beauty, Special Historic Sites and Special Natural Monuments
