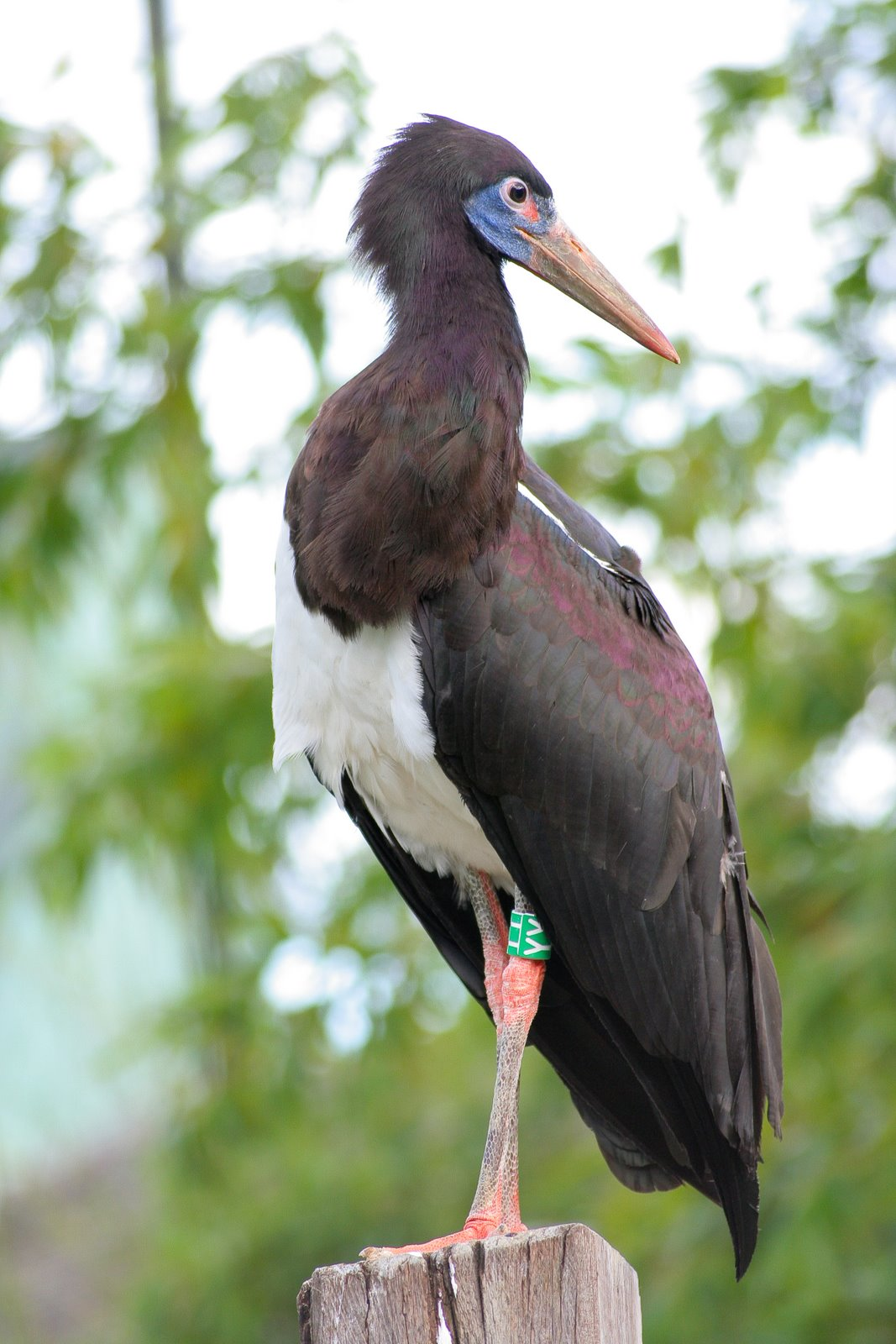
- At the London Zoo, England

Conservation status
- Least Concern (IUCN 3.1)

Scientific classification
- Kingdom: Animalia
- Phylum: Chordata
- Class: Aves
- Order: Ciconiiformes
- Family: Ciconiidae
- Genus: Ciconia
- Species: C. abdimii

Binomial name
- Ciconia abdimii Lichtenstein, MHC, 1823
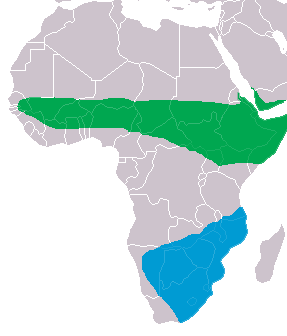
- Breeding (green), non-breeding visitor (blue)

= Abdim's stork =

Species of bird

Abdim's stork (Ciconia abdimii), also known as the white-bellied stork, is a stork belonging to the family Ciconiidae. It is the smallest species of stork, feeds mostly on insects, and is found widely in open habitats in Sub-Saharan Africa and in Yemen. The common name commemorates the Ottoman Albanian Governor of Wadi Halfa in Sudan, Bey El-Arnaut Abdim (1780–1827).

== Distribution and habitat ==
Abdim's stork is found widely in open habitats throughout Sub-Saharan Africa, from the Sahel to South Africa, being absent mainly from forests, dense woodlands and deserts. A smaller populations occurs in Yemen. It breeds colonially in trees, on cliffs or rooftops in the northern half of its range (north of the Equator) during the wet season from May to August, migrating to eastern and southern Africa for the remainder of the year. This stork has escaped or been deliberately released into Florida, U.S., but there is no evidence that the population is breeding and may only persist due to continuing releases or escapes.

Widespread and common throughout its large range, Abdim's stork is evaluated as Least Concern on the IUCN Red List of Threatened Species. It is the subject of several nationally coordinated breeding programs: in the United States, the plan for this species is administered by the Association of Zoos and Aquariums and in Europe by the European Association of Zoos and Aquaria.

== Description ==
Ciconia abdimii is a black stork with grey legs, red knees and feet, grey bill and white underparts. It has red facial skin in front of the eye and blue skin near the bill in breeding season. It is the smallest species of stork, at 73 cm (29 in) and a weight of just over 1 kg (2.2 lb).

== Biology ==
Abdim's stork is mostly insectivorous, feeding on locusts, caterpillars and other large insects, although these birds will also eat small reptiles, amphibians, mice, crabs and eggs. The female lays two to three eggs and is slightly smaller than the male.

== Gallery ==
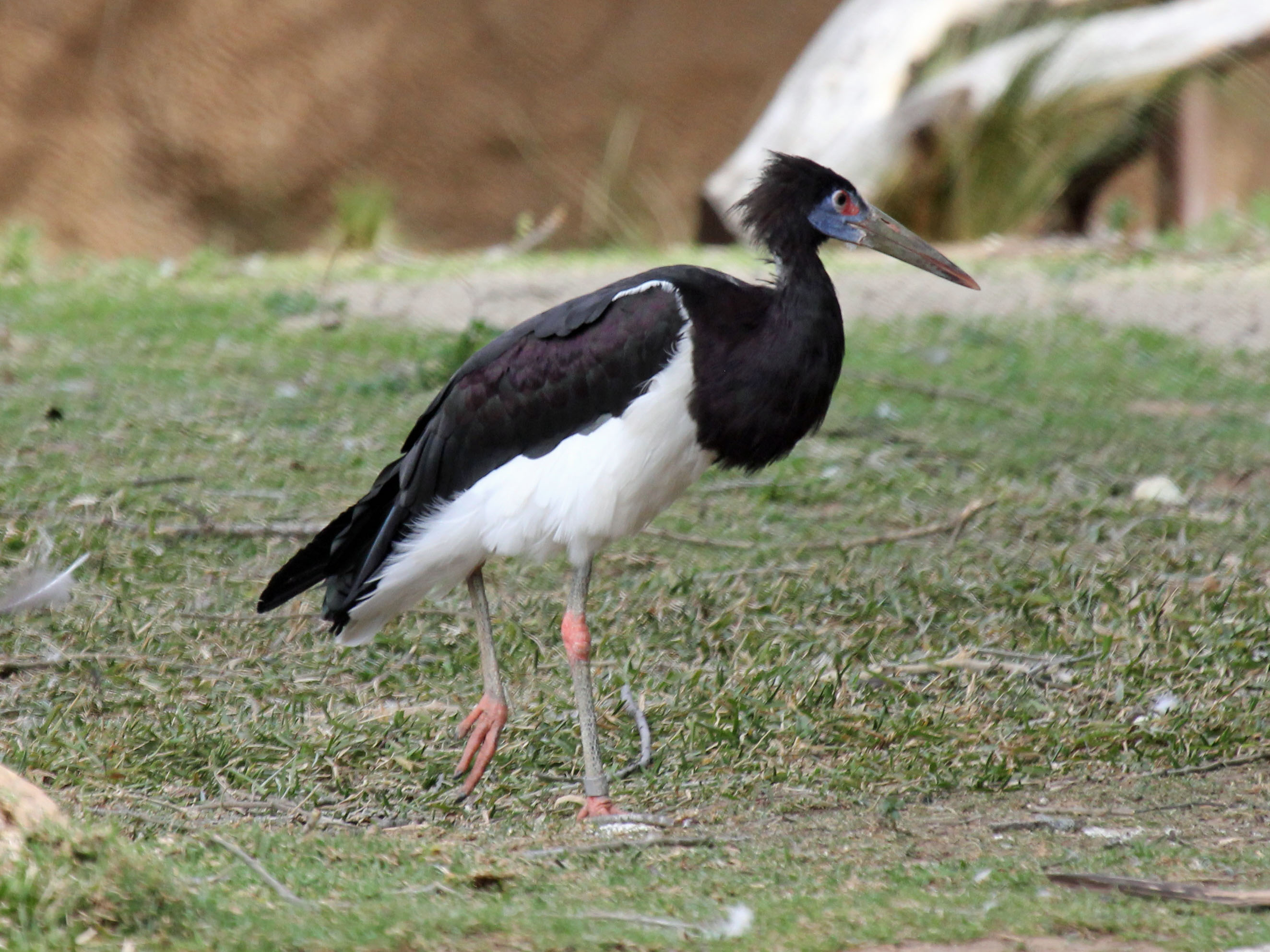
At the San Diego Zoo

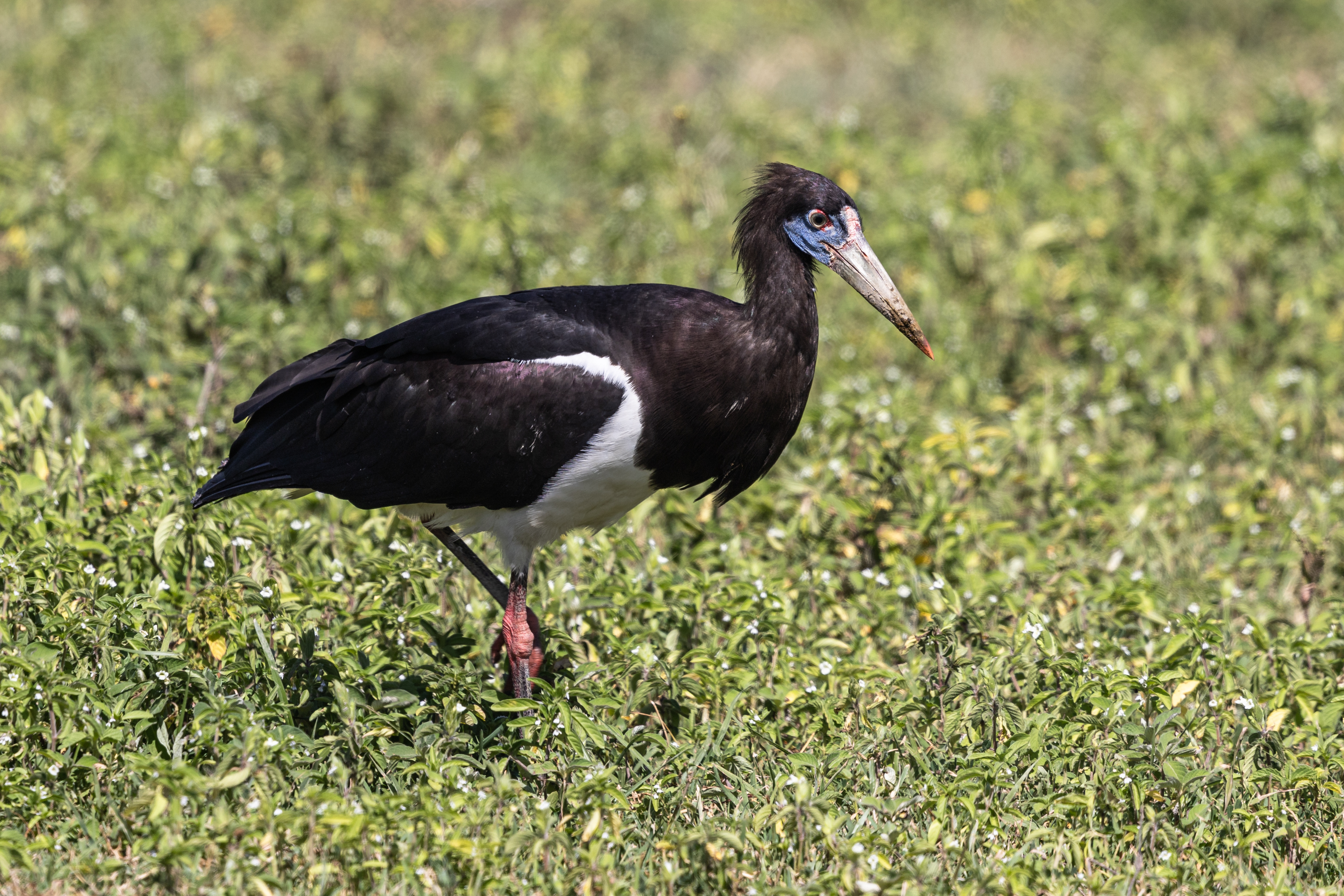
At Ngorongoro Conservation Area

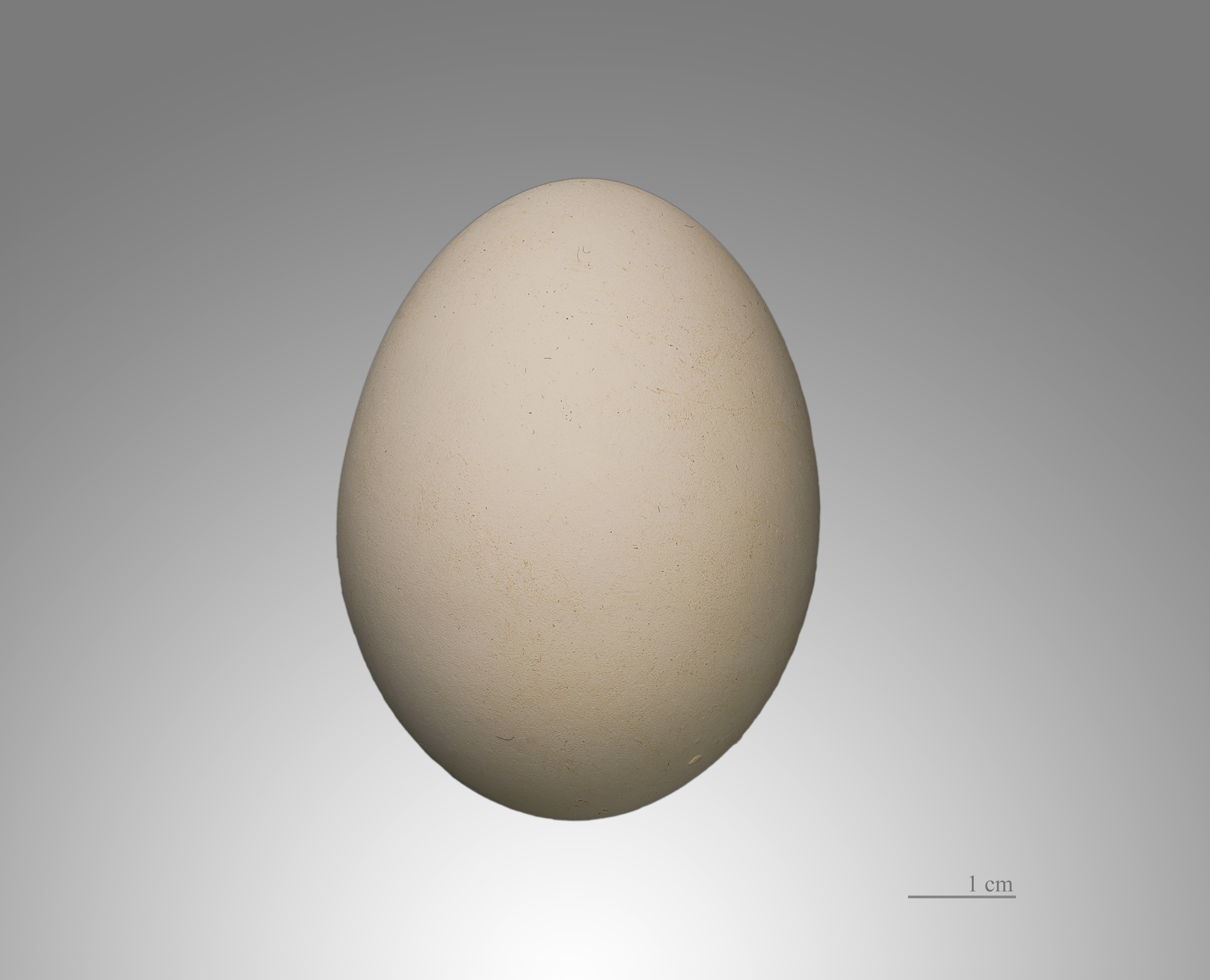
Egg of Ciconia abdimii

Ciconia abdimii at Busch Gardens Tampa (video clip)
