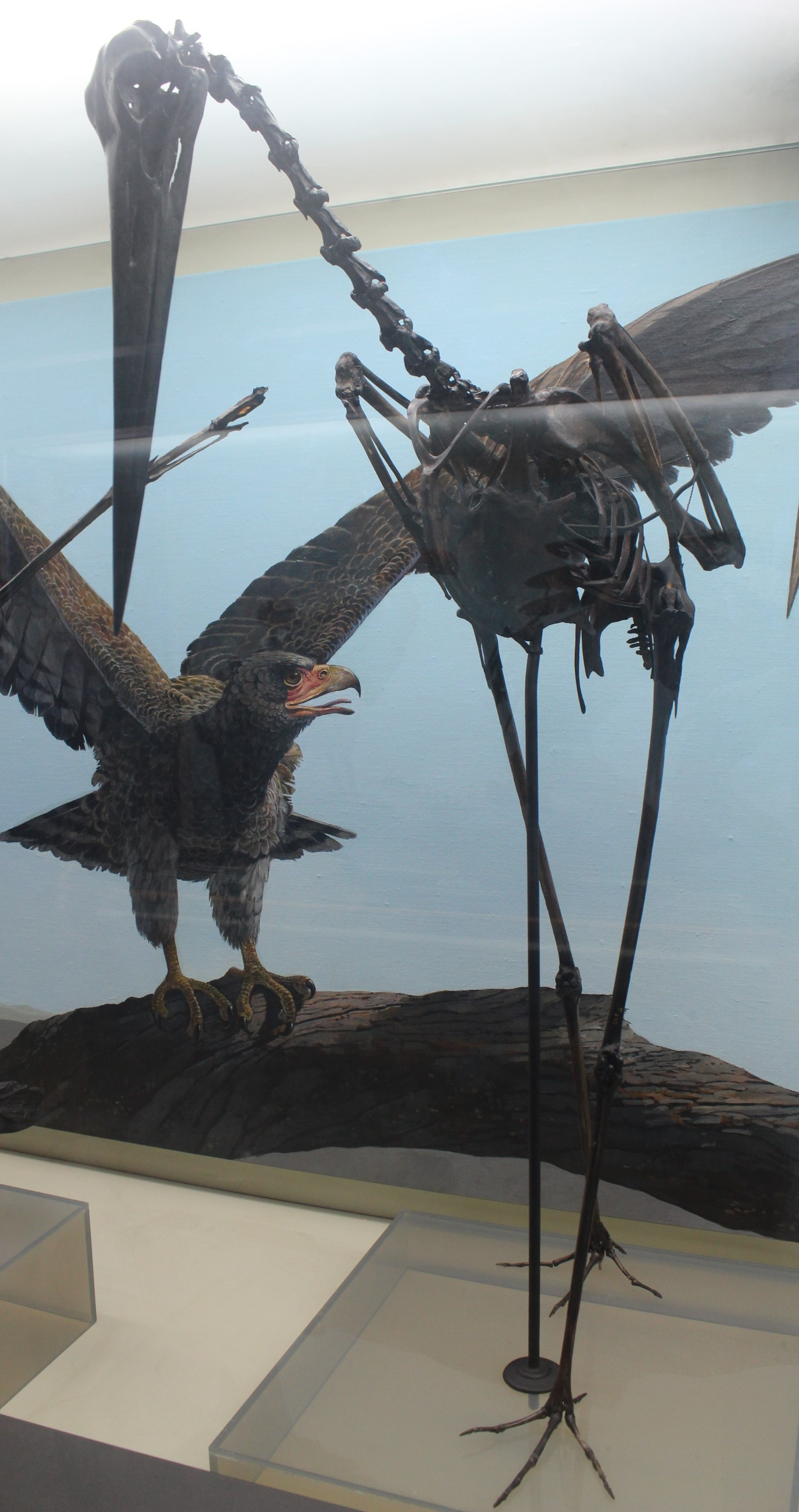
- Skeleton on display in the Page Museum at the La Brea Tar Pits

Scientific classification
- Kingdom: Animalia
- Phylum: Chordata
- Class: Aves
- Order: Ciconiiformes
- Family: Ciconiidae
- Genus: Ciconia
- Species: †C. maltha

Binomial name
- †Ciconia maltha Miller, 1910

= Ciconia maltha =

Ciconia maltha Temporal range: Late Pliocene - Late Pleistocene

Extinct species of bird

Ciconia maltha, also known as the asphalt stork or La Brea stork, is an extinct stork from the Late Pliocene – Late Pleistocene of United States (California, Oregon, Idaho and Florida), Cuba and Bolivia. It has been found in the La Brea Tar Pits, whence the species name maltha.

It is a relatively large species of Ciconia, with a height of over 5 feet (1.5 meters) and a wingspan up to 10 feet (3.0 meters) across.
