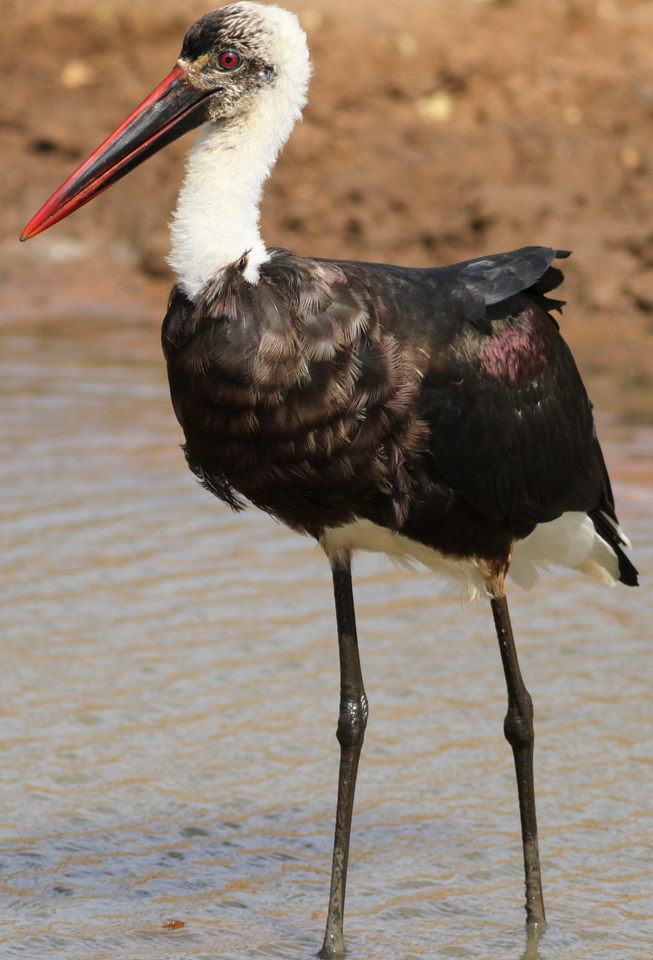
- In kwaZulu-Natal, South Africa

Conservation status
- Least Concern (IUCN 3.1)

Scientific classification
- Kingdom: Animalia
- Phylum: Chordata
- Class: Aves
- Order: Ciconiiformes
- Family: Ciconiidae
- Genus: Ciconia
- Species: C. microscelis

Binomial name
- Ciconia microscelis GR Gray, 1848

Subspecies
- Ciconia episcopus microscelis GR Gray, 1848

= African woolly-necked stork =

Species of bird

The African woolly-necked stork or African woollyneck (Ciconia microscelis) is a species of large wading bird in the stork family Ciconiidae. It breeds singly, or in small loose colonies. It is distributed in a wide variety of habitats including marshes in forests, agricultural areas, and freshwater wetlands across Africa.

== Taxonomy ==
It was formerly considered a subspecies of the Asian woolly-necked stork (C. episcopus), and called the woolly-necked stork, but was split as a distinct species by the International Ornithological Congress in 2023 on the basis of its allopatric range and significant plumage and morphological differences.

== Description ==
The African woolly-necked stork is a medium-sized stork at 75–92 cm tall. The iris is deep crimson or wine-red. The stork is glistening black overall with a black "skull cap", a downy white neck which gives it its name. The lower belly and under-tail coverts are white, standing out from the rest of the dark coloured plumage. Feathers on the fore-neck are iridescent with a coppery-purple tinge. These feathers are elongated and can be erected during displays. The tail is deeply forked and is white, usually covered by the black long under tail coverts. It has long red legs and a heavy, blackish bill, though some specimens have largely dark-red bills with only the basal one-third being black. Sexes are alike. Juvenile birds are duller versions of the adult with a feathered forehead that is sometimes streaked black-and-white. The African birds are described as having the edges of the black cap diffused or with a jagged border compared to a sharp and clean border in the Asian birds. Sexes are identical, though males are thought to be larger. When the wings are opened either during displays or for flight, a narrow band of very bright unfeathered skin is visible along the underside of the forearm. This band has been variously described as being "neon, orange-red", "like a red-gold jewel", and "almost glowing" when seen at close range.

Small nestlings are pale grey with buffy down on the neck, and a black crown. At fledging age, the immature bird is identical to the adult except for a feathered forehead, much lesser iridescence on feathers, and much longer and fluffier feathers on the neck. Newly fledged young have a prominent white mark in the center of the forehead that can be used to distinguish young of the year.

== Distribution and habitat ==
It is a widespread tropical species which breeds across much of western, eastern and south-central Africa. It is a resident breeder building nests on trees located on agricultural fields or wetlands, on natural cliffs, and on cell phone towers. They use a variety of freshwater wetlands including seasonal and perennial reservoirs and marshes, crop lands, irrigation canals and rivers. They are attracted to fires in grasslands and crop fields where they capture insects trying to escape the fire. They use ponds and marshes inside forests in both Africa. They use coastal areas in Africa also, and birds on the Kenya coast foraging in coral reefs and mudflats. In KwaZulu Natal, South Africa, they are accustomed to people feeding them, and nest on exotic tree species in sub-urban areas.

== Behaviour ==
Several calls by adult birds have been described including bisyllabic whistles given along with displays at the nest, and a fierce hissing sound when a bird was attacked by a trained falcon. The African woolly-necked stork is a broad winged soaring bird, which relies on moving between thermals of hot air for sustained long distance flight. Like all storks, it flies with its neck outstretched. It has also been observed to 'roll, tumble and dive at steep angles' in the air with the wind through its quills making a loud noise. Adult birds have also been observed diving from nests before flying away abruptly in a 'bat-like flight'.

This species is largely seen as single birds, in pairs, or in small family groups of 4–5. While flocks are uncommon, they occur in all parts of the distribution range of the species and can be seen in all seasons. Flocking is affected by different factors in different areas. In more arid areas, most of the flocks occur in the summer when few wetlands are remaining, whereas in areas with more water, flocks occur largely in winter after chicks have fledged from nests.

=== Diet ===
The African woolly-necked stork walks slowly and steadily on the ground seeking its prey, which like that of most of its relatives, consists of amphibians, reptiles and insects. In suburban South Africa, nestlings were provisioned largely with guttural toad (Sclerophrys gutturalis), but also with common river frogs (Amietia queckettii), fish, snakes, crabs and moles (Amblysomus sp.). Despite being provided with supplementary foods by people in South Africa, nestling diet was largely (>60%) natural animal species. More than two adult birds provisioned chicks of one nest in South Africa providing the first known evidence of cooperative behaviour in woolly-necked storks. Death of two nestlings was attributed to provisioning of processed foods that people fed adult birds.

=== Breeding ===
Typically, a large stick nest is built on a tree, and clutch size is two to six eggs, with five and six eggs being less common. Birds use both forest trees and scattered trees in agricultural areas. Birds use both forest trees and scattered trees in agricultural areas to build nests. In India, some nests have been being observed in or near urban areas on cell phone towers, but such nesting on artificial human-made structures is not a regular occurrence. Riverside cliffs are occasionally used for nesting. In South Africa, African woolly-necked storks nested largely on trees in suburban areas such as gardens with nests largely placed on exotic tree species such as Pinus elliottii, Eucalyptus sp., Melia azedarach, Cinnamommum camphora, and Jacaranda mimosifolia. Very few nests were built on native trees such as Trichilia dregeana, Ficus burkei and Syderoxylon inerme. Three of 30 nests in South Africa were built on anthropogenic structures: one on a rooftop of a two-story building, one in an unusual nest box, and one atop an electric pole.

Very few nests each year were placed on artificial structures such as electricity pylons, and the majority were placed on Dalbergia sissoo, Ficus religiosa and Eucalyptus sp. In Haryana's agricultural landscape, small numbers of woolly-necked stork nests were also found on Acacia nilotica, Azadirachta indica, Mangifera indica, Mitragyna parviflora, Syzhygium cumini and Tectona gradis. African woolly-necked Storks reused over 44% of nest sites for multiple years. Detailed observations of breeding habits in South Africa suggest that the woolly-necked stork is not an obligate wetland species unlike other stork species that locate their nests close to wetlands.

== Conservation ==
The African woolly-necked stork is one of the species to which the Agreement on the Conservation of African-Eurasian Migratory Waterbirds (AEWA) applies.
