= List of storks =

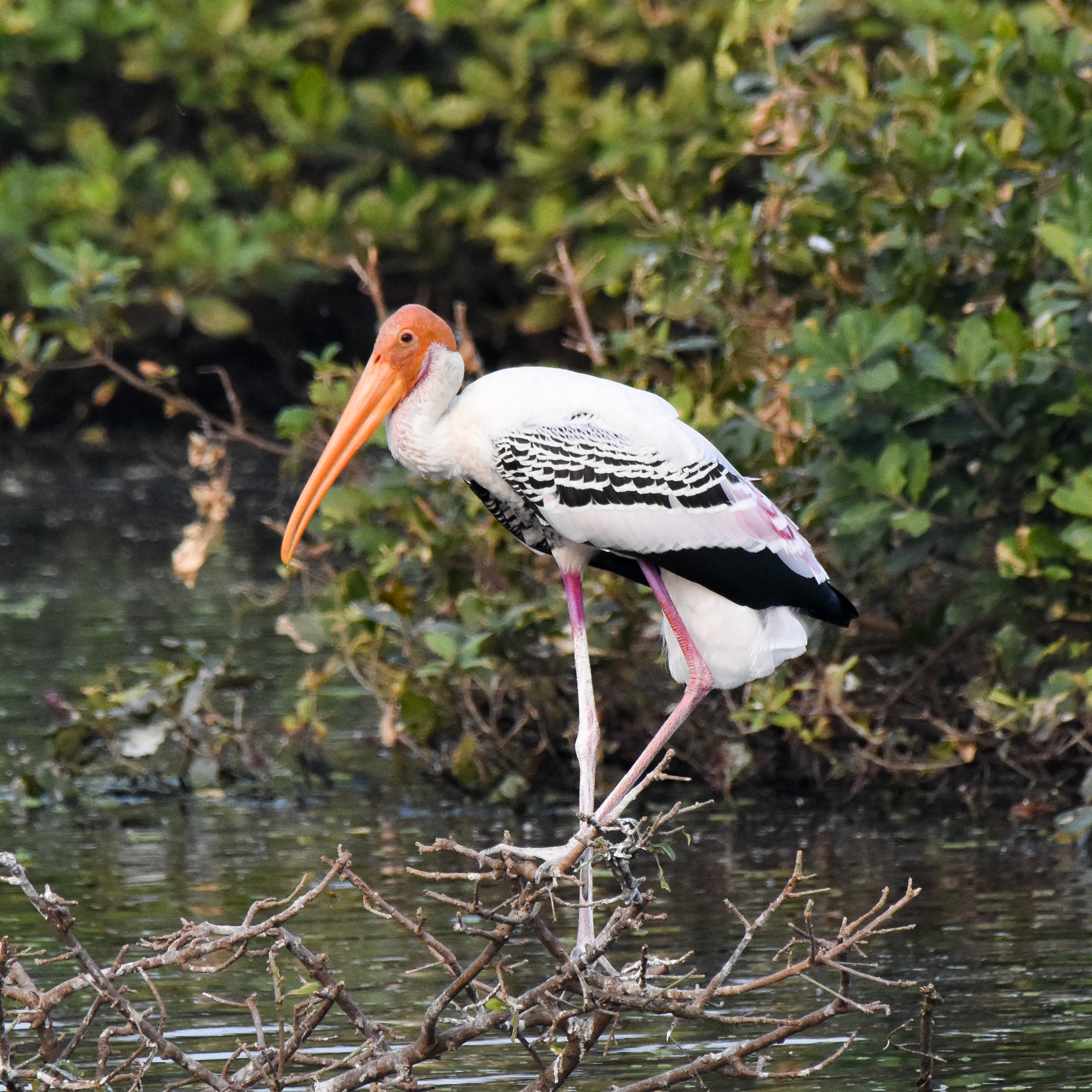
Painted stork

Ciconiidae is a family of heavy-bodied, large-billed wading birds in the monotypic order Ciconiiformes. Most species in the family are called storks, although some have different common names: two species in the genus Anastomus are known as openbills, two from the genus Leptoptilos are called adjutants, and three species are called jabiru. Storks are found in tropical and subtropical habitats around the world, mostly inhabiting wetlands and marshes, although some also inhabit forests and savannah. They are large birds with long legs, stout bills, and variable featherless patches on the head. The beaks of storks can be highly specialised depending on their function, as exemplified by the openbills, whose bills possess a gap between the mandibles to help capture freshwater snails.

Storks are threatened by habitat loss, pesticide use, and intentional hunting. Four species of stork—the milky stork, oriental stork, greater adjutant, and Storm's stork—are classified as being endangered on the IUCN Red List, while a further three are considered near-threatened and one is considered vulnerable. However, the conservation statuses of many species of stork seem to be based on mistaken assumptions and limited data, such as underestimating the ability of species to use agricultural land. Many species may consequently warrant a data deficient listing until more information about their ecology is available.

There are currently 20 extant species of stork recognised by the International Ornithologists' Union, distributed among 6 genera, 1 of which is monotypic. The order Ciconiiformes previously also included the herons (Ardeidae) and ibises and spoonbills (Threskiornithidae), but these have since been reassigned to other orders. The storks are most diverse in Afro-Eurasia, especially in Africa and Asia, and only three species, including the wood stork, are known from the Americas. Many species of fossil stork are also known from the Oligocene onwards; however, their exact number and taxonomy are unsettled due to ongoing discoveries.

== Conventions ==
IUCN Red List categories
Conservation status
- EX: Extinct (0 species)
- EW: Extinct in the wild (0 species)
- CR: Critically endangered (0 species)
- EN: Endangered (4 species)
- VU: Vulnerable (1 species)
- NT: Near threatened (3 species)
- LC: Least concern (12 species)

Conservation status codes listed follow the International Union for Conservation of Nature (IUCN) Red List of Threatened Species. Range maps are provided wherever possible; if a range map is not available, a description of the stork's range is provided. Ranges are based on the IOC World Bird List for that species unless otherwise noted. Population estimates are of the number of mature individuals and are taken from the IUCN Red List.

This list follows the taxonomic treatment (designation and order of species) and nomenclature (scientific and common names) of version 13.2 of the IOC World Bird List. Where the taxonomy proposed by the IOC World Bird List conflicts with the taxonomy followed by the IUCN (Note: The IUCN follows the taxonomy proposed by the HBW and BirdLife Taxonomic Checklist.) or the 2023 edition of The Clements Checklist of Birds of the World, the disagreement is noted next to the species's common name (for nomenclatural disagreements) or scientific name (for taxonomic disagreements).

== Classification ==
The International Ornithologists' Union (IOU) recognises 20 species of storks in six genera. This list does not include hybrid species, extinct prehistoric species, or putative species not yet accepted by the IOU. Ciconiidae has traditionally been divided into three tribes: Mycteriini, containing Mycteria and Anastomus, Ciconiini, containing Ciconia, and Leptoptilini, containing Leptoptilos, Ephippiorhynchus, and Jabiru. However, the exact division of these genera among these tribes is contentious and different authors recognise from two to four tribes. Recent genetic studies incorporated by the IOU have suggested that Mycteriini and Leptoptilini are paraphyletic (not including all of a common ancestor's descendants), and that Ephippiorhynchus and Jabiru should be moved into their own tribe, Ephippiorhynchini.

- Genus Anastomus: two species
- Genus Leptoptilos: three species
- Genus Mycteria: four species
- Genus Jabiru: one species
- Genus Ephippiorhynchus: two species
- Genus Ciconia: eight species

- Anastomus
  - African openbill (A. lamelligerus)
  - Asian openbill (A. oscitans)
- - Leptoptilos
    - Marabou stork (L. crumenifer)
    - - Lesser adjutant (L. javanicus)
      - Greater adjutant (L. dubius)
  - - Mycteria
      - Wood stork (M. americana)
      - - Yellow-billed stork (M. ibis)
        - - Painted stork (M. leucocephala)
          - Milky stork (M. cinerea)
    - - - Jabiru
          Jabiru (J. mycteria)
        - Ephippiorhynchus
          - Saddle-billed stork (E. senegalensis)
          - Black-necked stork (E. asiaticus)
      - Ciconia
        - - Abdim's stork (C. abdimii)
          - - Asian woolly-necked stork (C. episcopus)
            - Storm's stork (C. stormi)
        - - Black stork (C.nigra)
          - - Maguari stork (C. maguari)
            - - African woolly-necked stork (C. microscelis)
              - - White stork (C. ciconia)
                - Oriental stork (C. boyciana)

Phylogeny recognised by the International Ornithologists' Union, based partially on de Sousa and colleagues, 2023.

== Ciconiids ==
Genus Anastomus – Bonnaterre, 1791 – 2 species
Common name	Scientific name and subspecies	Range	IUCN status and estimated population
African openbill	A. lamelligerus Temminck, 1823 Two subspecies: A. l. lamelligerus; A. l. madagascariensis	Africa	LC 300,000–500,000
Asian openbill	A. oscitans (Boddaert, 1783)	India and Southeast Asia	LC Unknown

Genus Leptoptilos – Lesson, R. P., 1831 – 3 species
Common name	Scientific name and subspecies	Range	IUCN status and estimated population
Marabou stork (Note: Called the marabou by the IUCN)	L. crumenifer (Lesson, R. P., 1831)	Sub-Saharan Africa	LC Unknown
Lesser adjutant	L. javanicus (Horsfield, 1821)	South and Southeast Asia	VU 5,500–10,000
Greater adjutant	L. dubius (Gmelin, J. F., 1789)	Northern India	EN 800–1,200

Genus Mycteria – Linnaeus, 1758 – 4 species
Common name	Scientific name and subspecies	Range	IUCN status and estimated population
Wood stork	M. americana Linnaeus, 1758	Americas, from southeastern United States south to northern Argentina	LC Unknown
Yellow-billed stork	M. ibis (Linnaeus, 1766)	Sub-Saharan Africa	LC Unknown
Painted stork	M. leucocephala (Pennant, 1769)	India and Southeast Asia	NT 16,000–24,000
Milky stork	M. cinerea (Raffles, 1722)	Southeast Asia	EN 1,500

Genus Jabiru – Hellmayr, 1906 – 1 species
Common name	Scientific name and subspecies	Range	IUCN status and estimated population
Jabiru	J. mycteria (Lichtenstein, M. H. C., 1819)	Central and South America	LC 20,000–85,000

Genus Ephippiorhynchus – Bonaparte, 1855 – 2 species
Common name	Scientific name and subspecies	Range	IUCN status and estimated population
Saddle-billed stork (Note: Called the saddlebill by the IUCN)	E. senegalensis (Shaw, 1800)	Sub-Saharan Africa	LC 670–17,000
Black-necked stork	E. asiaticus (Latham, 1790) Two subspecies: E. l. asiaticus; E. l. australis	India, Southeast Asia, New Guinea, and Australia	NT 15,000–35,000

Genus Ciconia – Brisson, 1760 – 8 species
Common name	Scientific name and subspecies	Range	IUCN status and estimated population
Abdim's stork	C. abdimii Lichtenstein, M. H. C., 1823	Africa	LC Unknown
Asian woolly-necked stork (Note: Called the Asian woollyneck by the IUCN)	C. episcopus (Boddaert, 1783) Two subspecies: C. e. episcopus; C. e. neglecta	South and Southeast Asia	NT 50,000–249,999
Storm's stork	C. stormi (Blasius, W., 1896)	Malay Peninsula, Borneo, Sumatra, and nearby islands	EN 260–330
Black stork	C. nigra (Linnaeus, 1758)	Widespread through Africa, Asia, and Europe	LC 24,000–44,000
Maguari stork	C. maguari (Gmelin, J. F., 1789)	South America	LC Unknown
African woolly-necked stork (Note: Called the African woollyneck by the IUCN)	C. microscelis Gray, G. R., 1848	Sub-Saharan Africa	LC 10,000–100,000
White stork	C. ciconia (Linnaeus, 1758) Two subspecies: C. c. ciconia; C. c. asiatica	Widely throughout Africa and Paleartic of Asia and Europe	LC 700,000–704,000
Oriental stork	C. boyciana Swinhoe, 1873	Siberia, China, Korea, and Japan	EN 1,000–2,499
