= Jabiru codorensis =

Jabiru codorensis Temporal range: Early Pliocene

Scientific classification
- Domain: Eukaryota
- Kingdom: Animalia
- Phylum: Chordata
- Class: Aves
- Order: Ciconiiformes
- Family: Ciconiidae
- Genus: Jabiru
- Species: J. codorensis

Binomial name
- Jabiru codorensis Walsh & Sánchez, 2008

Extinct species of bird

Jabiru codorensis is an extinct species of stork related to the extant Jabiru. It lived in what is now Venezuela during the Pliocene period and appears to have been similar to its modern relative.

== History and naming ==
Jabiru codorensis is known from two specimens collected from the Pliocene Codore Formation, specifically the E1 Jebe Member. The holotype, AMU CURS 130–5, is a tibiotarsus lacking its proximal end. The second specimen, paratype (AMU CURS 130–5), a tarsometatarsus likewise lacks its proximal end and was found in association with the holotype specimen. Due to the proximity of the two specimens it is believed that they stem from the same individual. It was named by Stig Walsh and Rodolfo Sánchez in 2008. While examining the material, they initially thought the bones belonged to a phorusrhacid, a family of large cursorial predatory birds. Although fossil material of the genus Jabiru had been reported in the past, said remains have either been mentioned without source or were later regarded as belonging to the stork Ciconia maltha.

The species name was chosen to reflect the Codore Formation where the fossils had been found.

== Description ==
Although morphologically similar to the extant Jabiru (Jabiru mycteria), this species differs from its relative through the narrower and shorter sulcus extensorius. It also possesses a pons supratendineus which protrudes at a shallower angle and an additional sulcus on the caudal surface of the tibiotarsus. The tarsometatarsus also differs from the modern Jabiru, having a deeper plantar sulcus and a more weakly developed ridge along the fossa supratrochlearis plantaris.

The tibiotarsus is long and slender, growing more slender as it moves away from the proximal end before widening again at the epiphysis at the distal end of the bone. The preserved portion of the bone is 248.5 mm (9.78 in) long, but taking into account the missing proximal end it may have reached a total length of 340 mm (13 in). The front (cranial) surface of the shaft is flattened, while the back takes on a more rounded shape. Due to fossilisation the bone is slightly compressed. The sulcus extensorius, a groove on the surface of the bone, is narrow but deep, making up 28% of the shaft's depth in some areas of the bone. The pons supratendineus emerges at a similar angle as in the painted stork, but with sloping sides resembling modern jabirus and storks of the genus Ephippiorhynchus. The intercondylar notch is deep and perfectly round, which identifies the bone as belonging to a stork. Both protrusions of the tibiotarsus that border this notch are equal in size with an oval outline, flattened surface and a prominent notch. In the fossil the distal caudal surface is flattened to such a degree that the transition to the lateral and medial surface of the bone is prominently angled. This trait is shared by only two other known storks, the modern Jabiru and the black-necked stork. There is also an additional depression on this surface, which is unlikely to be caused by taphonomy given its presence on the least compressed part of the fossil, and not found in its modern relative.

Much like the tibiotarsus, the tarsometatarsus is a slender bone of great length, exceeding the tibiotarsus with a preserved length of 280 mm (11 in). However it would be shorter in life as it is calculated that the missing element only accounts for an additional 20 mm (0.79 in). With the exception of the less pronounced cristae hypotarsi, what is preserved of the proximal end is similar to Jabiru mycteria. The shaft of the bone is broader than in the bones of extant Jabirus, however this may be due to the deformation that the bone went through while fossilizing. Here too the sulcus extensorius is narrow and takes up 79% of the shaft's surface. This sulcus widens slightly towards its proximal most end. A prominent ridge is present on the plantar surface of the joints that connect the tarsometatarsus with the metatarsals. It borders the also prominent fossa supratrochlearis plantaris and is much better-developed than in marabou storks as well as members of Ciconia and Ephippiorhynchus, some of which even lack this feature entirely. However the ridge is not as broad as in Mycteria and Jabiru.

The known elements are almost identical to Jabiru mycteria in size, which are known to reach a height of 1.53 m (5 ft 0 in) and a wingspan of 2.3–2.8 m (7 ft 7 in – 9 ft 2 in).

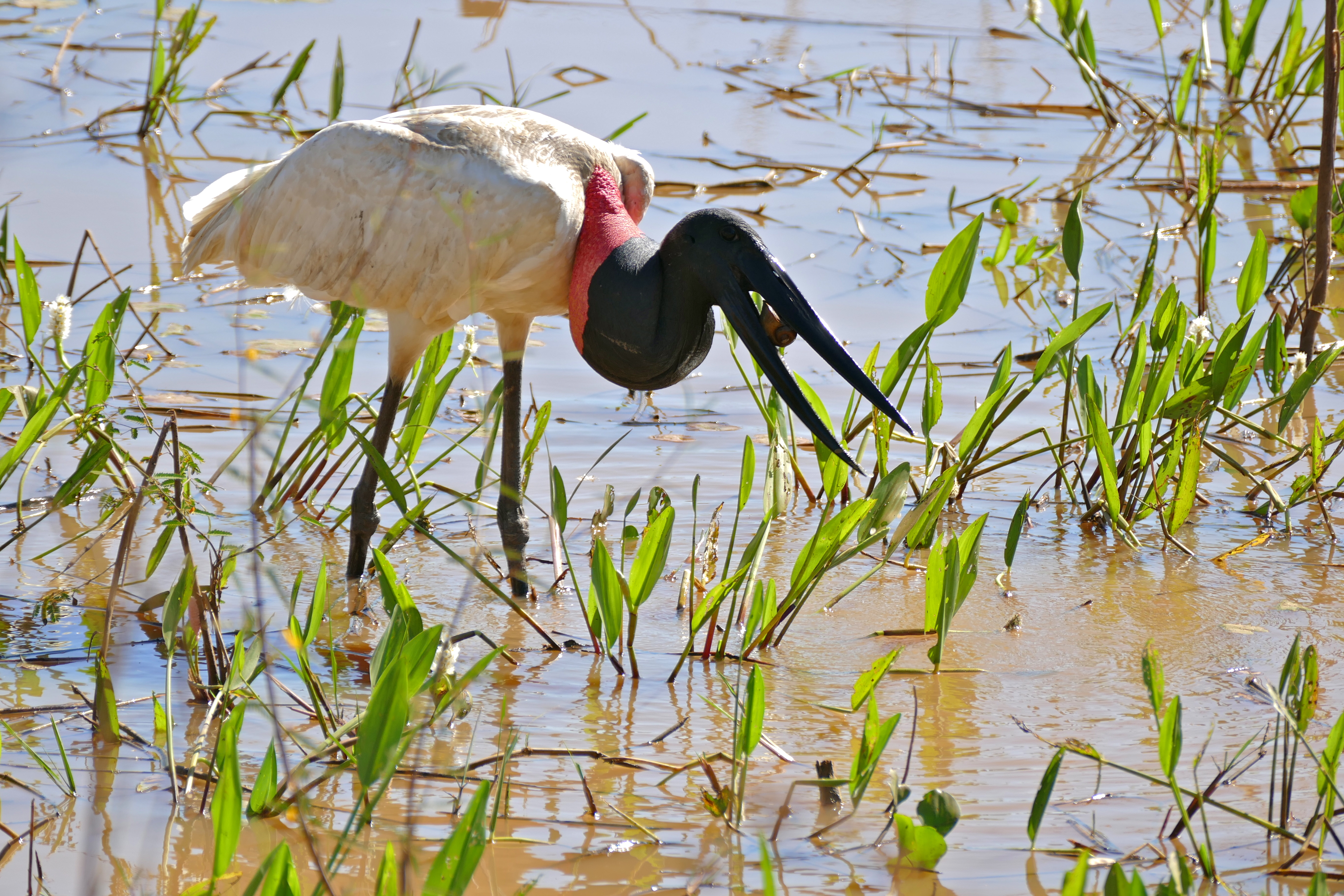
Modern Jabirus (Jabiru mycteria) feed on various small animals

== Paleobiology ==
Modern Jabirus are widespread across South America, ranging from Honduras to Argentina with an isolated report indicating an animal that made it as far north as Texas. In ints native range Jabirus live in wetland environments and swamps, where they feed on a variety of small animals including reptiles, fish and various invertebrates. The El Jebe Member of the Codore Formation is thought to preserve similar conditions to those that Jabirus inhabit today, which, alongside the similar morphology, may indicate that Jabiru codorensis lead a similar lifestyle to its modern relative. During the Pliocene, the region was a floodplain with both slow moving meandering rivers in the west and a larger river in the central portion of the region.
