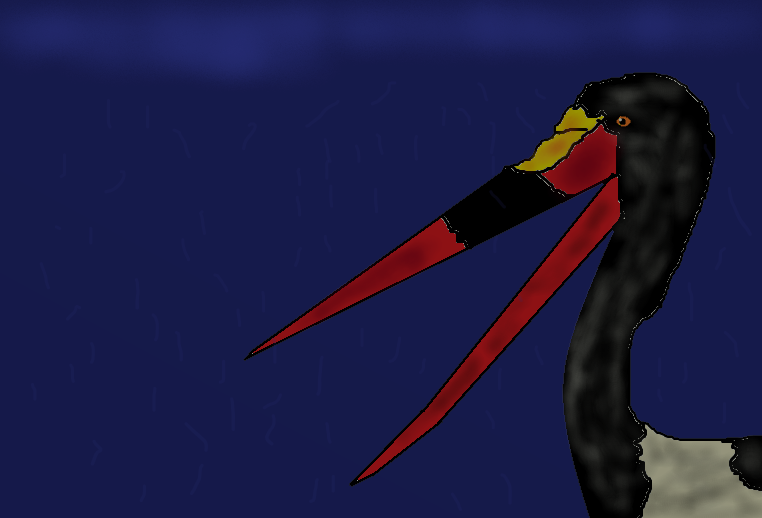
- Palaeoephippiorhynchus edwardsi

Scientific classification
- Kingdom: Animalia
- Phylum: Chordata
- Class: Aves
- Order: Ciconiiformes
- Family: Ciconiidae
- Genus: †Palaeoephippiorhynchus; Lambrecht, 1930

Species
- P. dietrichi Lambrecht, 1930

= Palaeoephippiorhynchus =

Palaeoephippiorhynchus Temporal range: Oligocene

Extinct genus of birds

Palaeoephippiorhynchus is an extinct genus of large stork from the Oligocene of Africa: its closest living relative is the saddle-billed stork.
