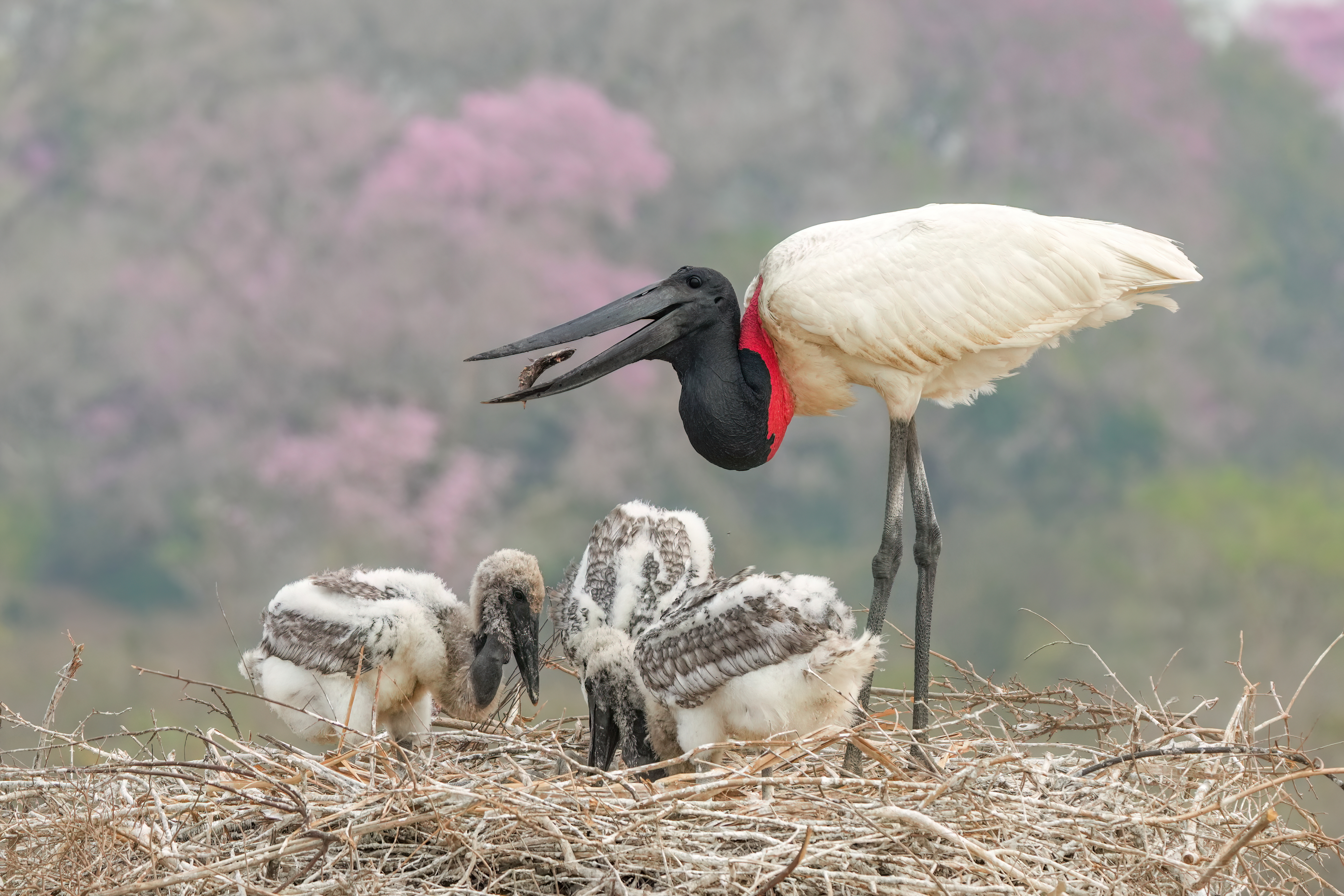
- Jabiru feeding its chicks in the Pantanal, Brazil

Conservation status
- Least Concern (IUCN 3.1)
- CITES Appendix I

Scientific classification
- Kingdom: Animalia
- Phylum: Chordata
- Class: Aves
- Order: Ciconiiformes
- Family: Ciconiidae
- Genus: Jabiru; Hellmayr, 1906
- Species: J. mycteria

Binomial name
- Jabiru mycteria (Lichtenstein, MHC, 1819)

= Jabiru =

Genus of stork

The jabiru (/ˌdʒæbɪˈruː/ or /ˈdʒæbɪruː/; Jabiru mycteria) is a large stork found in the Americas from Mexico to Argentina, except west of the Andes. The only member of the genus of the same name, it is most common in the Pantanal region of Brazil and the eastern Paraguayan Chaco. It sometimes wanders into the United States, usually in Texas, but also reportedly in Mississippi, Oklahoma and Louisiana. The name comes from the Tupi–Guaraní languages and means 'swollen neck'.

== Taxonomy ==
Hinrich Lichtenstein described the jabiru in 1819. The name jabiru has also been used for two other birds of a distinct genus: the black-necked stork (Ephippiorhynchus asiaticus), commonly called jabiru in Australia; and sometimes also for the saddle-billed stork (Ephippiorhynchus senegalensis) of Sub-Saharan Africa. In particular, the latter is believed to be depicted by Gardiner's Egyptian hieroglyph G29, sometimes labeled jabiru in hieroglyph lists. The Ephippiorhynchus is thought to be the jabiru's closest living cousin, indicating an Old World origin for the species.

The proposed Late Pleistocene fossil stork genus Prociconia from Brazil might actually belong in Jabiru. A fossil species of jabiru was found in the Zanclean (early Pliocene) Codore Formation near Urumaco, Venezuela, and named Jabiru codorensis.

In Brazil, this species is called tuiuiu or tuim-de-papo-vermelho 'red-necked tuim' in Mato Grosso and cauauá in the Amazon Basin. The name jabiru is used for the wood stork (Mycteria americana).

== Description ==
The jabiru is the tallest flying bird found in South America and Central America, often standing nearly the same height as the flightless and thus much heavier greater rhea. For the continent, it also has the second-largest wingspan, after the Andean condor (that is, excluding the great albatross occasionally found off the coast of southern South America). The adult jabiru is 120–140 cm (47–55 in) long, 2.3–2.8 m (7.5–9.2 ft) across the wings, and can weigh 4.3–9 kg (9.5–19.8 lb). Sexual dimorphism is high, possibly the highest of any stork, with males being about 25% larger than females. Females weigh an average of 5.22 kg (11.5 lb), whereas males weigh an average of 6.89 kg (15.2 lb) and may stand as tall as 1.53 m (5.0 ft). The beak, which measures 25–35 cm (9.8–13.8 in), is black and broad, slightly upturned, and ends in a sharp point. The tail measures 20–25 cm (7.9–9.8 in), the tarsus measures 28.5–39 cm (11.2–15.4 in) long and the wing chord measures 58.5–73 cm (23.0–28.7 in). The plumage is mostly white, but the head and upper neck are featherless and black, with a featherless red stretchable patch at the base. The sexes are similar in appearance but the male is larger, which can be noticeable when the sexes are together. While it can give the impression of being an ungainly bird on the ground, the jabiru is a powerful and graceful flier.

== Life history ==
=== Food and feeding habits ===
The jabiru lives in large groups near rivers and ponds and eats prodigious quantities of frogs, fish, snakes, snails, insects, and other invertebrates. It will even eat fresh carrion and dead fish, such as those that die during dry spells, and thus help maintain the quality of isolated bodies of water. They feed in flocks and usually forage by wading in shallow water. Jabirus detect prey more through tactile sensation than vision. They feed by holding their open bill at a 45-degree angle to the water. When prey is contacted, the storks close their bill, draw it out of the water, and throw their head back to swallow. Fish around 8 to 20 cm (3.1 to 7.9 in) are typically taken, though larger fish weighing up to at least 500 g (1.1 lb) and eels up to 80 cm (31 in) can be taken. It is an opportunistic feeder: in one instance, when house mice experienced a population explosion in an agricultural area, several hundred jabirus could be seen in each field feeding on the rodents – this was unusual for a bird that is rarely seen in large numbers anywhere. Rarely, jabirus attempt to kleptoparasitize the two smaller storks it co-exists with, the wood and maguari storks.

=== Breeding ===
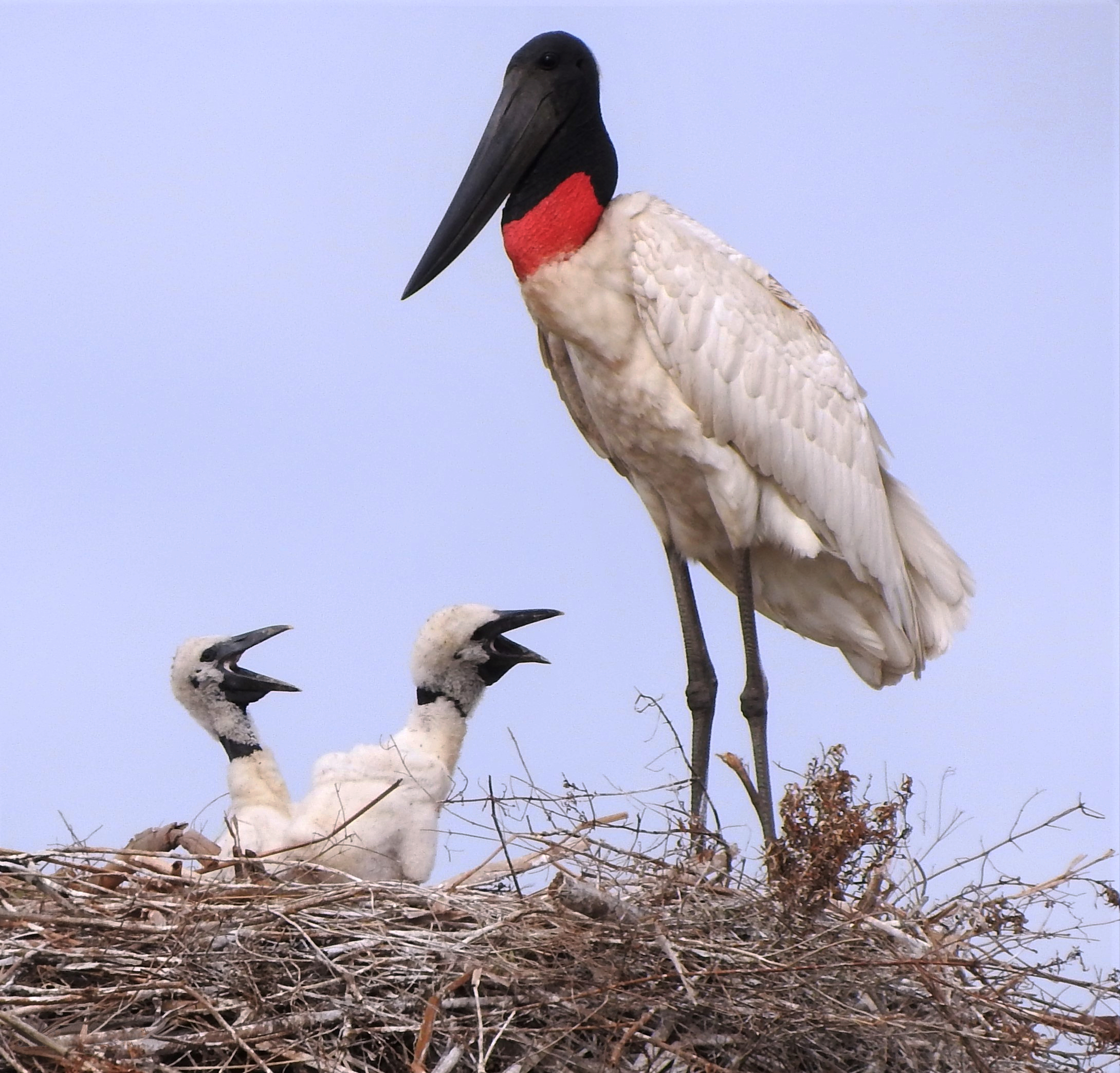
Jabiru with chicks at the nest

Jabirus are solitary nesters, building massive nest platforms that are used repeatedly in successive seasons. Unlike many other storks, these species are often seen in pairs in the nonbreeding season, suggesting a lifelong pair bond. The nest of sticks is built by both parents around August–September (in the Southern Hemisphere) on tall trees, and enlarged at each succeeding season, growing to several meters in diameter. Nests are often deeper than they are wide; they can be up to 1 m (3.3 ft) wide and 1.8 m (5.9 ft) deep. Half a dozen nests may be built in close proximity, sometimes among nests of herons and other birds. The parents take turns incubating the clutch of two to five white eggs and are known to be more territorial than usual against other jabirus during the breeding period. Wood storks and other jabirus are occasional predators of jabiru eggs, but most nest predators appear to avoid these huge-billed birds and there are no known predators of healthy adult jabirus. Although the young fledge around 110 days old, they often spend around another 3 months in the care of their parents. Because of this long length of time spent brooding, pairs have difficulty breeding in successive years. Less than half of active pairs in one season are active the next season, and only 25% of successful pairs are successful the next season. The lifespan average is 36 years. The jabiru has a diploid number of 2n = 56.

== Conservation ==
Jabirus are widespread but not abundant in any area. They are considered a species of least concern by the IUCN, an improvement from a status of near threatened in 1988. Jabiru gained protected status in Belize in 1973. Since then, their numbers in that area have slowly risen. They have been granted protected status by the US Migratory Bird Treaty Act.

== Gallery ==
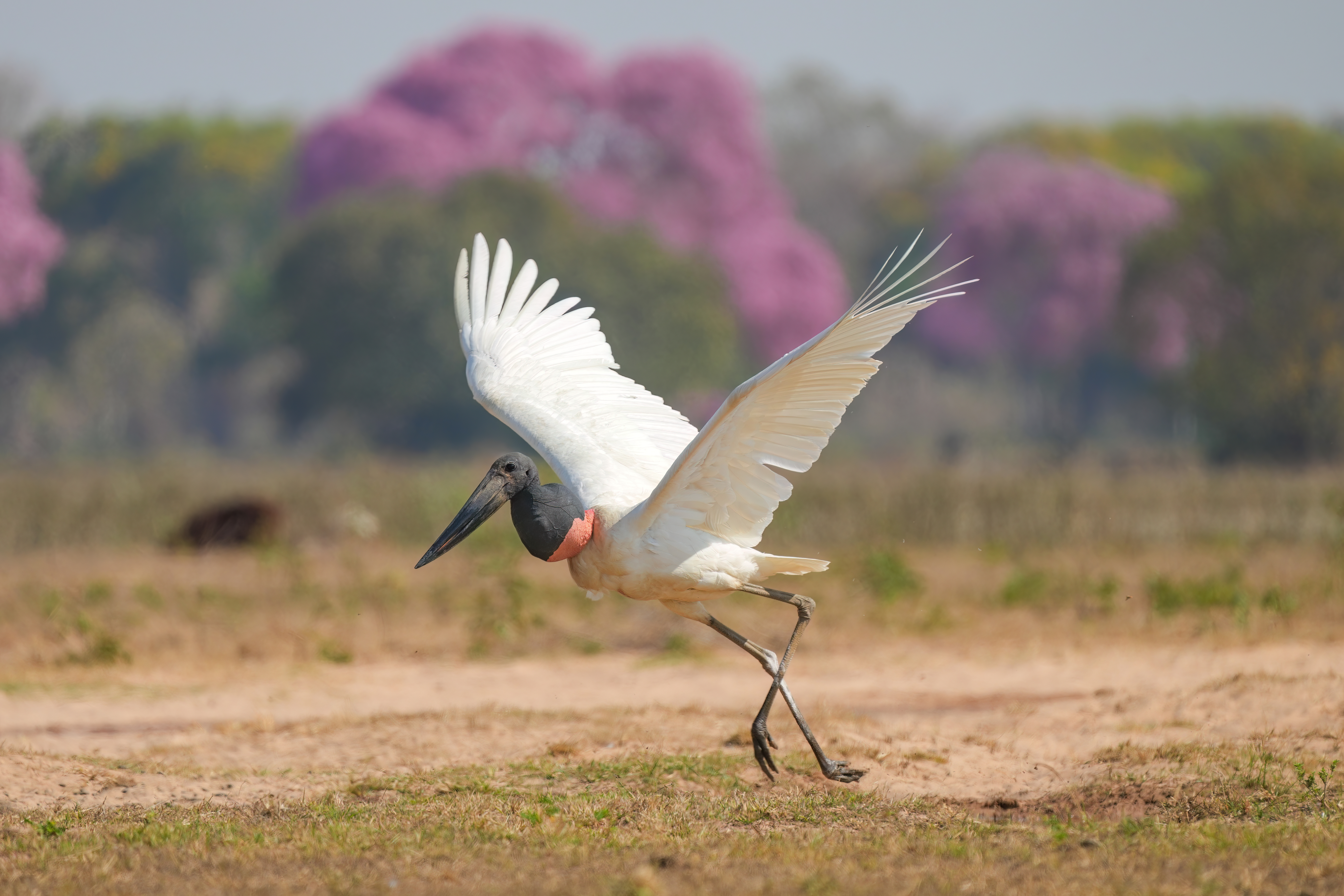
Jabiru taking off in the Pantanal, Brazil

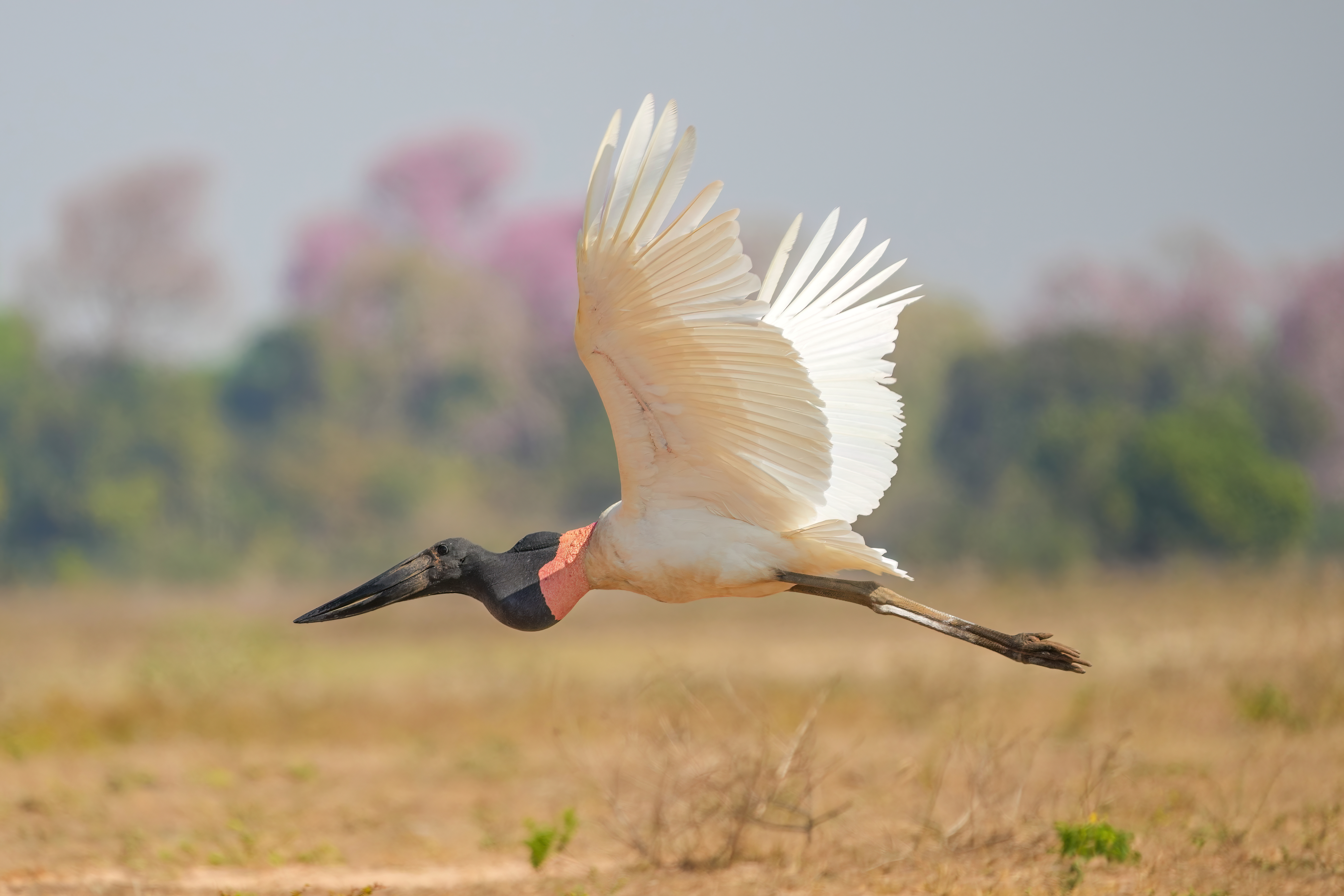
Jabiru in flight in the Pantanal, Brazil

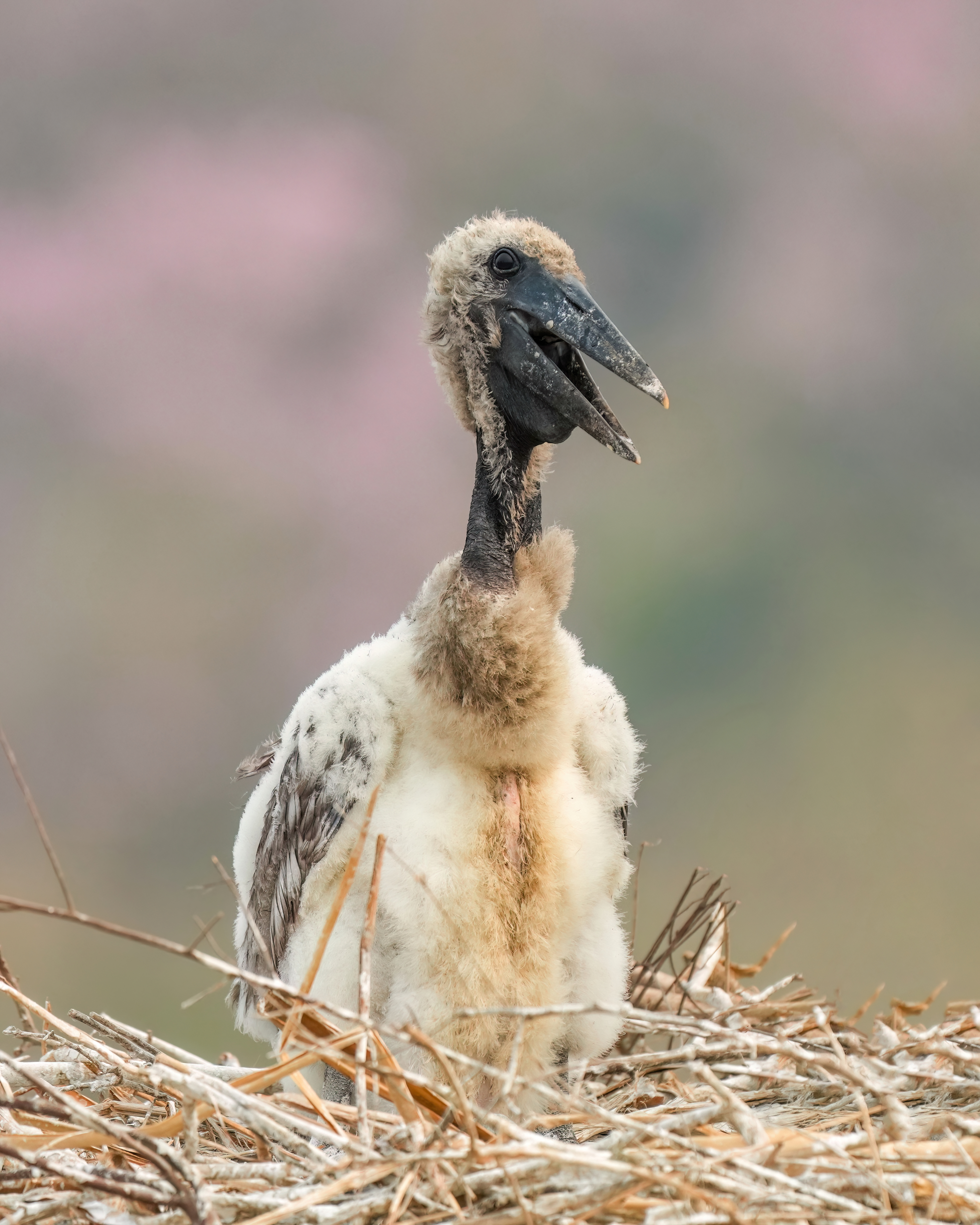
Jabiru chick in the Pantanal, Brazil

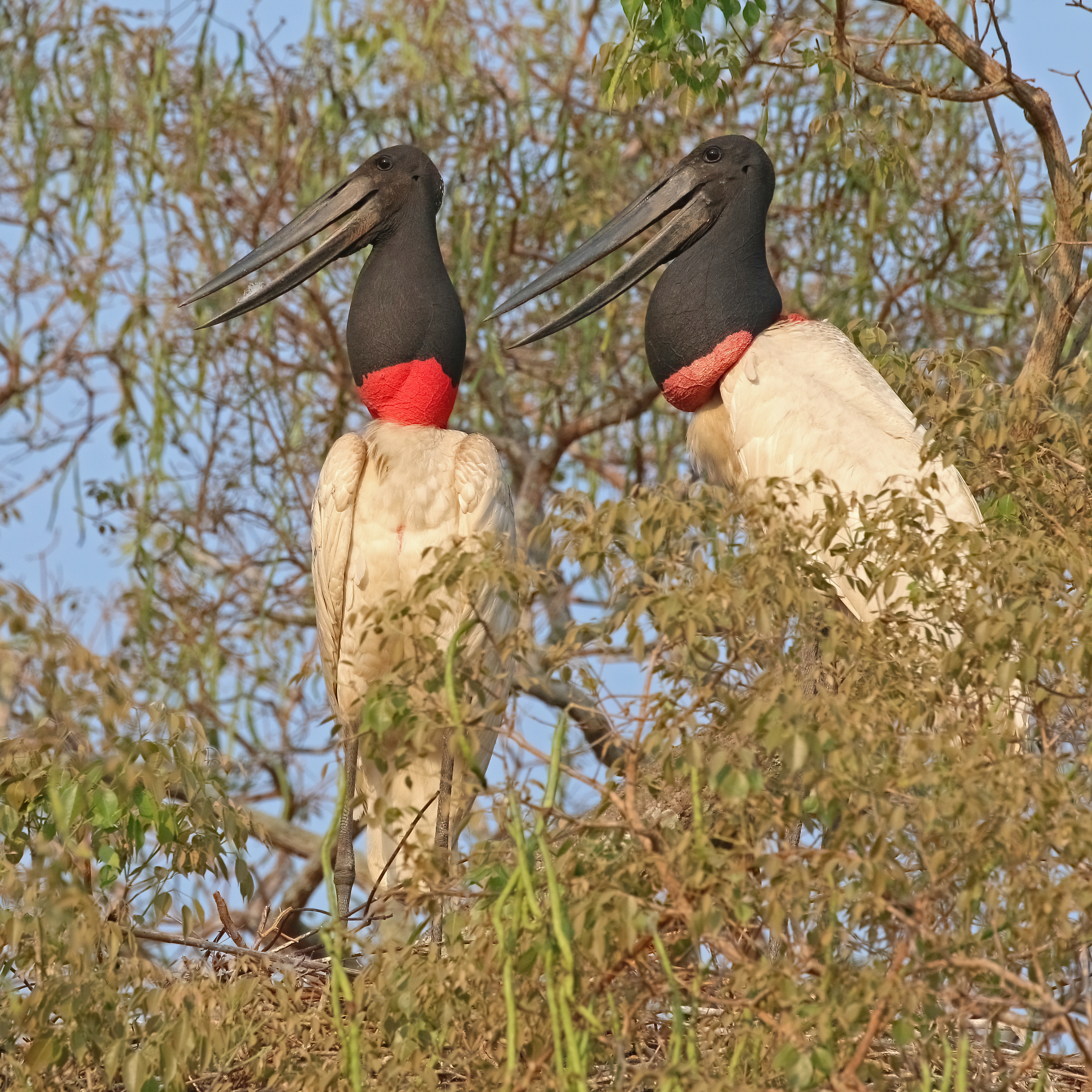
Pair on nest, in the Pantanal, Brazil

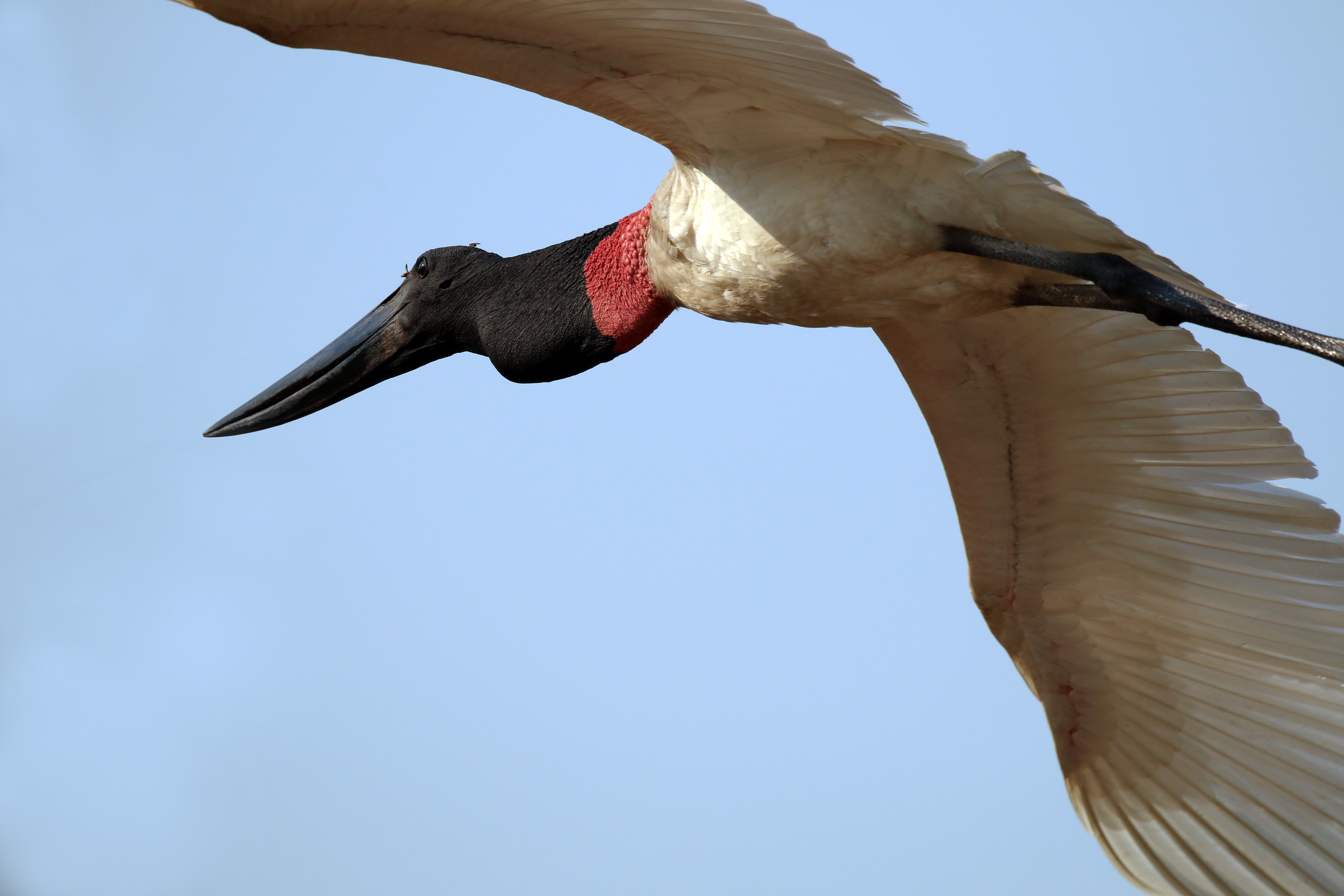
In flight over the Pantanal, Brazil

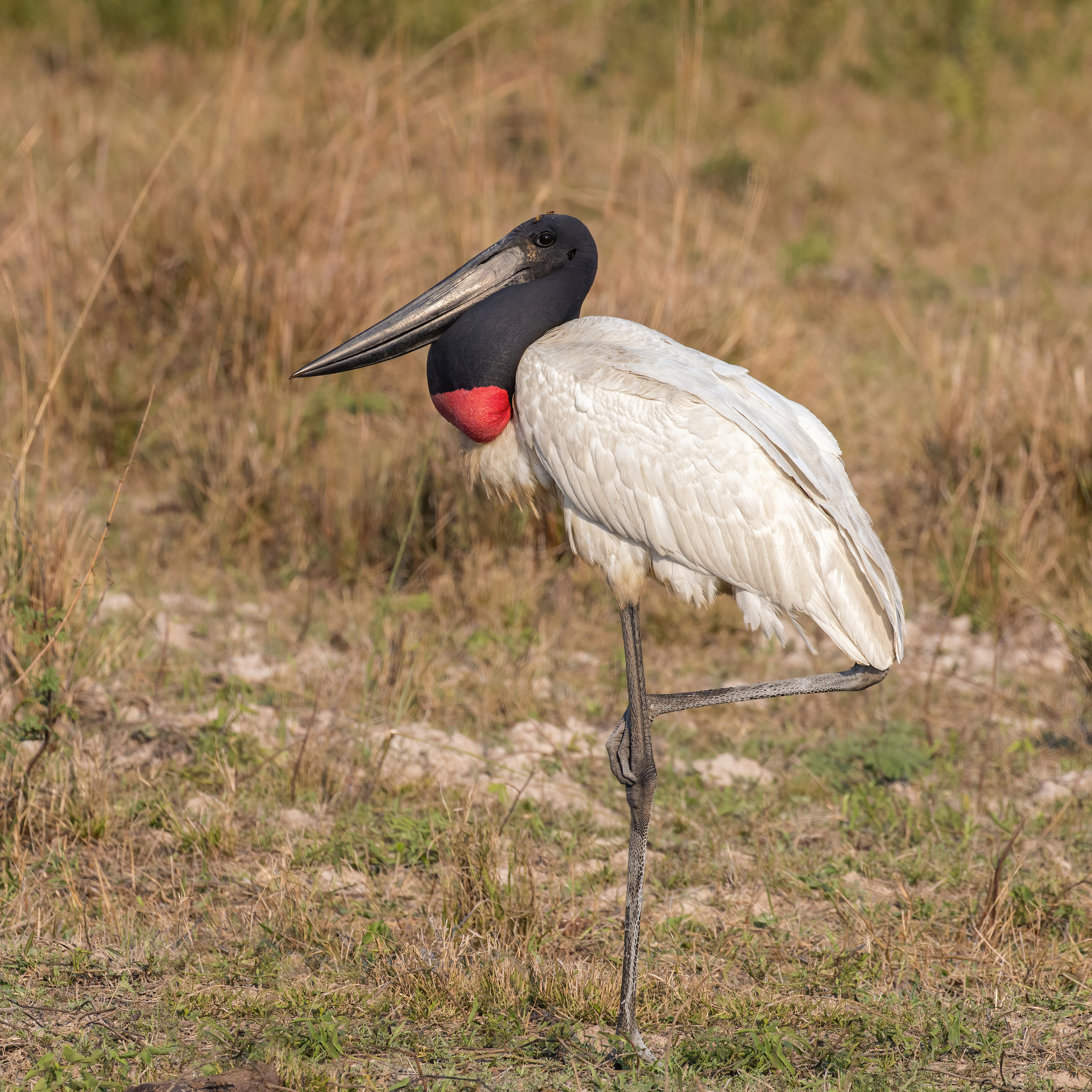
In the Pantanal, Brazil
