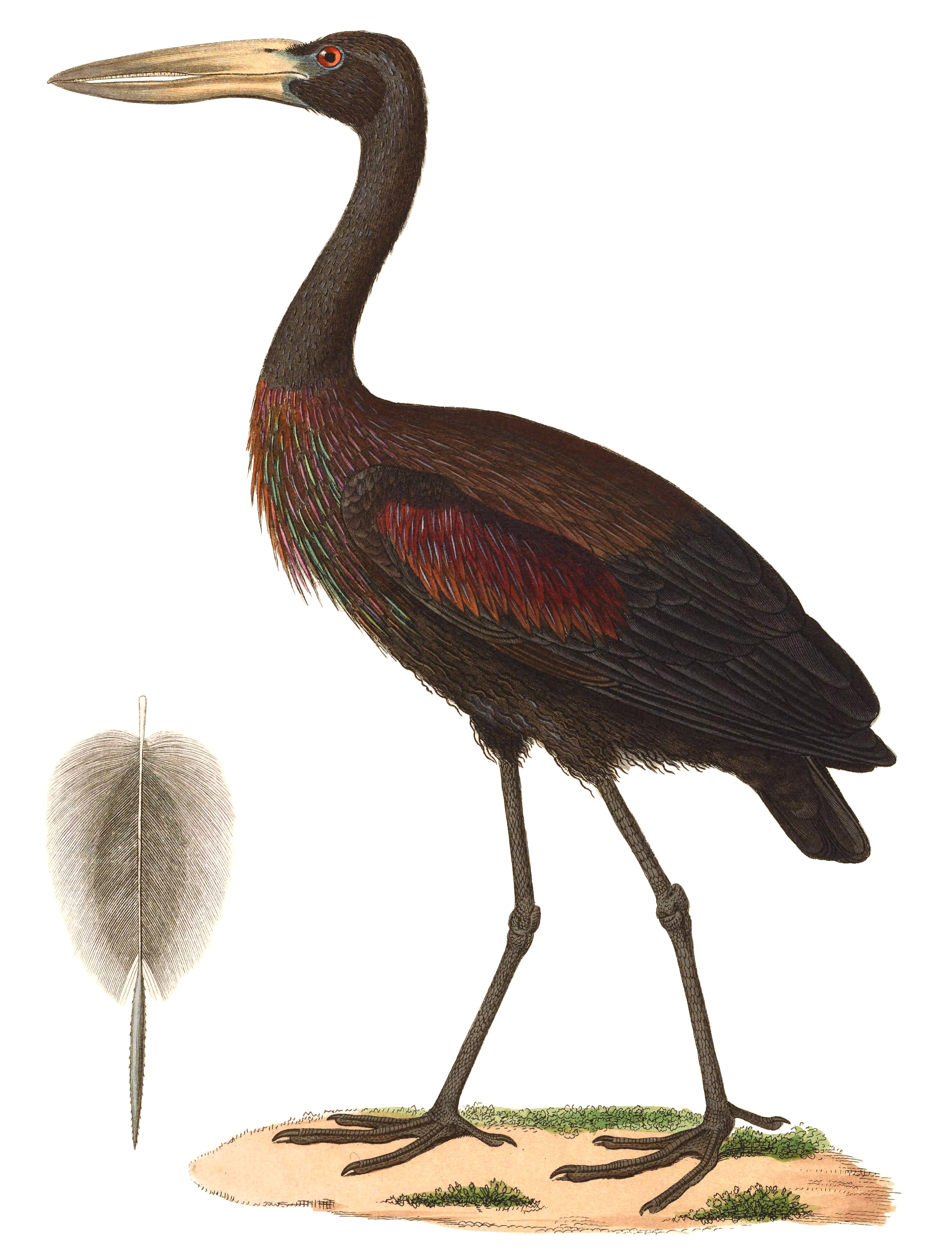
- African openbill by Huet & Prêtre

Scientific classification
- Kingdom: Animalia
- Phylum: Chordata
- Class: Aves
- Order: Ciconiiformes
- Family: Ciconiidae
- Genus: Anastomus; Bonnaterre, 1791

Type species
- Ardea oscitans Boddaert, 1783

Species
- Anastomus lamelligerus; Anastomus oscitans

Synonyms
- Hians Lacepede, 1799; Rhynchochasme Hermann, 1804; Empharis Rafinesque, 1815 (Nom. Nov.); Apertirostra Drapiez, 1822; Chaenoramphe Dumont, 1817; Chaenoramphus Thon, 1830 (Emend.); Chenoramphus Gray, 1848 (Emend.); Hiator Reichenbach, 1852-53

= Openbill stork =

Openbill storks

Genus of birds

The openbill storks or openbills are two species of stork (family Ciconiidae) in the genus Anastomus. They are large wading birds characterized by large bills, the mandibles of which do not meet except at the tip. This feature develops only in the adults. Both species feed predominantly on molluscs. The roof of the upper bill is fringed with plate-like structures ("lamellae") in the African openbill, but these are absent in the Asian openbill.

== Taxonomy ==
The genus Anastomus was erected by the French naturalist Pierre Bonnaterre in 1791. The type species was subsequently designated as the Asian openbill (Anastomus oscitans). The name Anastomus is from the Ancient Greek αναστομοω anastomoō meaning "to furnish with a mouth" or "with mouth wide-opened".

There are two species of openbilled storks:

Genus Anastomus – Bonnaterre, 1791 – two species
| Common name | Scientific name and subspecies | Range | Size and ecology | IUCN status and estimated population |
|---|---|---|---|---|
| African openbill | Anastomus lamelligerus Temminck, 1823 Two subspecies: A. l. lamelligerus; A. l. madagascariensis | A resident breeder in Sub-Saharan Africa, including Madagascar | Size: measuring 80–94 cm (31–37 in) and weighing 1–1.3 kg (2.2–2.9 lb) Habitat: Diet: aquatic snails and fresh water mussels | LC |
| Asian openbill | Anastomus oscitans (Boddaert, 1783) | A resident breeder in tropical southern Asia from India and Sri Lanka east to Southeast Asia. | Size: 68 cm (27 in) height (81 cm (32 in) long). Habitat: Diet: | LC |
