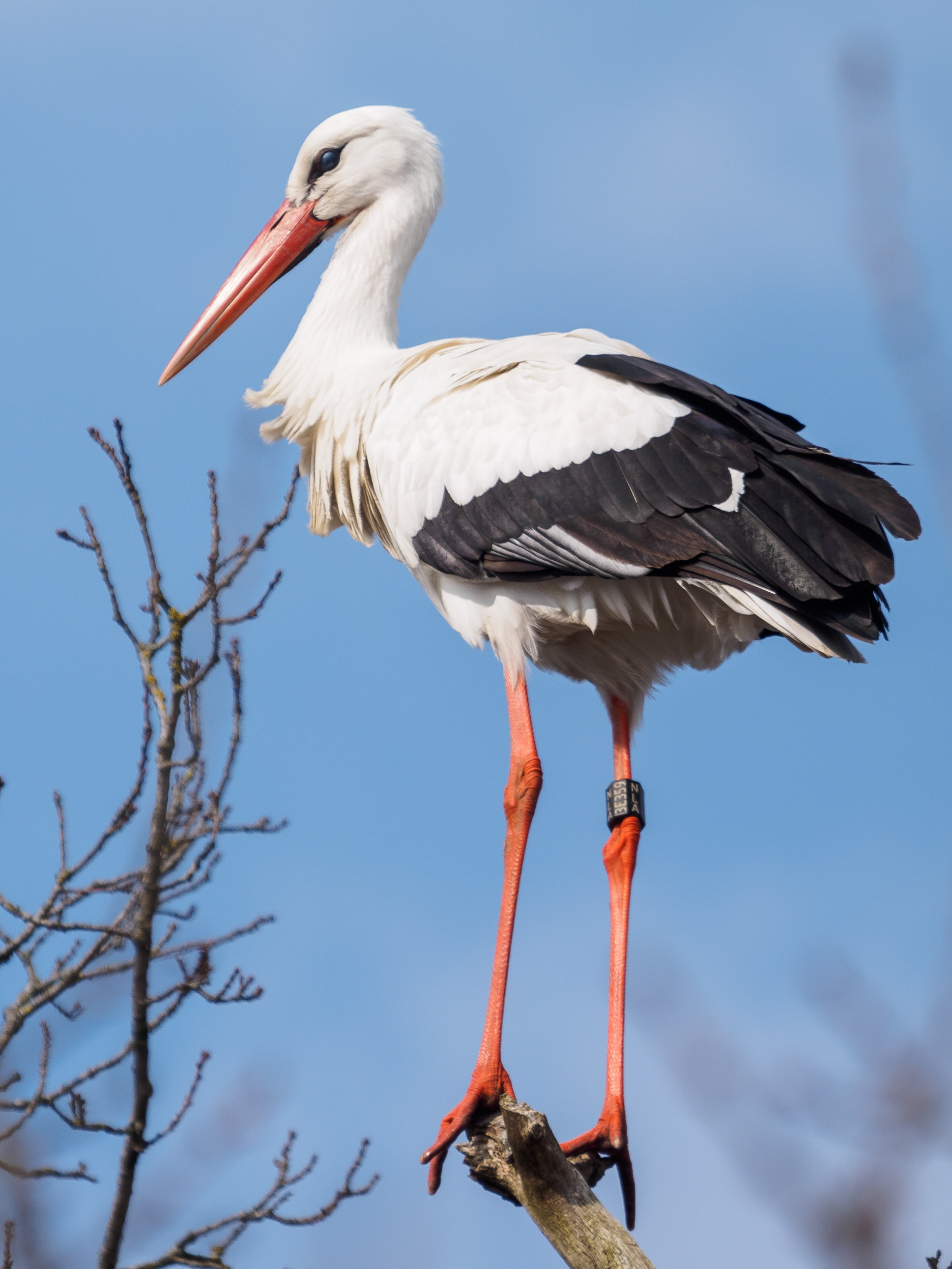
- White stork (Ciconia ciconia)

Scientific classification
- Kingdom: Animalia
- Phylum: Chordata
- Class: Aves
- Superorder: Pelecanimorphae
- Order: Ciconiiformes; Bonaparte, 1854
- Family: Ciconiidae; J.E. Gray, 1840

Genera
- Anastomus; Ciconia; Ephippiorhynchus; Jabiru; Leptoptilos; Mycteria

= Stork =

Stork Temporal range: Early Oligocene to present 30–0 Ma

Type of wading bird

Storks are large, long-legged, long-necked wading birds with long, stout bills. They belong to the family Ciconiidae, and make up the order Ciconiiformes /sɪˈkoʊni.ɪfɔːrmiːz/. Ciconiiformes previously included a number of other families, such as herons and ibises, but those families have been moved to the order Pelecaniformes.

Storks dwell in many regions and tend to live in drier habitats than the closely related herons, spoonbills and ibises; they also lack the powder down that those groups use to clean off fish slime. Bill-clattering is an important mode of communication at the nest. Many species are migratory. Most storks eat frogs, fish, insects, earthworms, small birds and small mammals. There are 20 living species of storks in six genera.

Various terms are used to refer to groups of storks, two frequently used ones being a muster of storks and a phalanx of storks.

Storks tend to use soaring, gliding flight, which conserves energy. Soaring requires thermal air currents. Ottomar Anschütz's famous 1884 album of photographs of storks inspired the design of Otto Lilienthal's experimental gliders of the late nineteenth century. Storks are heavy, with wide wingspans: the marabou stork, with a wingspan of 3.2 m (10 ft 6 in) and weight up to 8 kg (18 lb), joins the Andean condor in having the widest wingspan of all living land birds.

Their nests are often very large and may be used for many years. Some nests have been known to grow to over 2 metres (6 ft 7 in) in diameter and about 3 metres (9.8 ft) in depth. All storks were once thought to be monogamous, but this is only partially true. While storks are generally socially monogamous, some species exhibit regular extra-pair breeding.

Popular conceptions of storks' fidelity, serial monogamy, and doting parental care contribute to their prominence in mythology and culture, especially in Western folklore as the deliverers of newborn humans.

All 20 stork species have been assessed by the IUCN and carry a confident Red List status. However, the assessments for several species were based on incorrect assumptions and a general lack of sound information on stork habits.

== Etymology ==
The word "stork" was first used in its current sense by at least the 12th century in Middle English. It is derived from the Old English word storc, which itself comes from the hypothesised Proto-Germanic *stork and ultimately the Proto-Indo-European *sr̥ǵos. The name refers to the rigid posture of storks, a meaning reflected in the related word stark, which is derived from the Old English stearc. Several species of storks are known by other common names. The jabiru is named after the Tupí-Guarani words meaning "that which has" and "swollen", referring to its thickset neck. The marabou stork is named after the Arabic word for holy man, murābiṭ, due to the perceived holy nature of the species. The adjutants are named after the military rank, referring to their stiff, military-like gait.

== Systematics ==
A DNA study found that the families Ardeidae, Balaenicipitidae, Scopidae and the Threskiornithidae belong to the Pelecaniformes. This would make Ciconiidae the only group.

Storks were distinct and possibly widespread by the Oligocene. Like most families of aquatic birds, storks seem to have arisen in the Palaeogene, maybe 40–50 million years ago (mya). For the fossil record of living genera, documented since the Middle Miocene (about 15 mya) at least in some cases, see the genus articles.

No species or subspecies of stork is known to have gone extinct in historic times. A systematic literature review uncovered nearly 1,000 papers on storks, but showed most stork species to lack scientific understanding, suggesting that many species should be classified as Data Deficient on the IUCN Red List. A Ciconia bone found in a rock shelter on the island of Réunion was probably of a bird taken there as food by early settlers; no known account mentions the presence of storks on the Mascarene Islands.

=== Phylogeny ===
The following phylogeny is recognized by the International Ornithological Congress, partially based on de Sousa et al (2023):

- - Openbill stork (Anastomus oscitans)
- - - Marabou stork (Leptoptilos crumenifer)
    - - Lesser adjutant (Leptoptilos javanicus)
      - Greater adjutant (Leptoptilos dubius)
  - - - Wood stork (Mycteria americana)
      - - Yellow-billed stork (Mycteria ibis)
        - - Painted stork (Mycteria leucocephala)
          - Milky stork (Mycteria cinerea)
    - - - Jabiru (Jabiru mycteria)
        - - Saddle-billed stork (Ephippiorhynchus senegalensis)
          - Black-necked stork (Ephippiorhynchus asiaticus)
      - - - Abdim's stork (Ciconia abdimii)
          - - Asian woolly-necked stork (Ciconia episcopus)
            - Storm's stork (Ciconia stormi)
        - - Black stork (Ciconia nigra)
          - - Maguari stork (Ciconia maguari)
            - - African woolly-necked stork (Ciconia microscelis)
              - - White stork (Ciconia ciconia)
                - Oriental stork (Ciconia boyciana)

=== Fossil storks ===
- Genus Palaeoephippiorhynchus (fossil: Early Oligocene of Fayyum, Egypt)
- Genus Grallavis (fossil: Early Miocene of Saint-Gérand-le-Puy, France, and Djebel Zelten, Libya) – may be same as Prociconia
- Ciconiidae gen. et sp. indet. – formerly Aquilavus/Cygnus bilinicus (fossil: Early Miocene of Břešťany, Czech Republic)
- Ciconiidae gen. et sp. indet. (Ituzaingó Late Miocene of Paraná, Argentina) (Note: Tarsometatarsus fragments somewhat similar to Mycteria)
- Ciconiidae gen. et sp. indet. (Puerto Madryn Late Miocene of Punta Buenos Aires, Argentina) (Note: Specimen MEF 1363: Incomplete skeleton of a large stork somewhat similar to Jabiru but apparently more plesiomorphic)
- cf. Leptoptilos gen. et sp. indet. – formerly L. siwalicensis (fossil: Late Miocene? – Late Pliocene of Siwalik, India)
- Ciconia nana (fossil: Pleistocene of Darling Downs, Queensland, Australia, and Ciconia louisebolesae fossil: Olig-Miocene of Riversleigh WHA, Queensland, Australia
- Genus Pelargosteon (fossil: Early Pleistocene of Romania)
- Genus Prociconia (fossil: Late Pleistocene of Brazil) – may belong to modern genus Jabiru or Ciconia
- Ciconiidae gen. et sp. indet. (fossil: Late Pleistocene of San Josecito Cavern, Mexico)

The fossil genera Eociconia (Middle Eocene of China) and Ciconiopsis (Deseado Early Oligocene of Patagonia, Argentina) are often tentatively placed with this family. A "ciconiiform" fossil fragment from the Touro Passo Formation found at Arroio Touro Passo (Rio Grande do Sul, Brazil) might be of the living wood stork M. americana; it is at most of Late Pleistocene age, a few 10,000s of years.

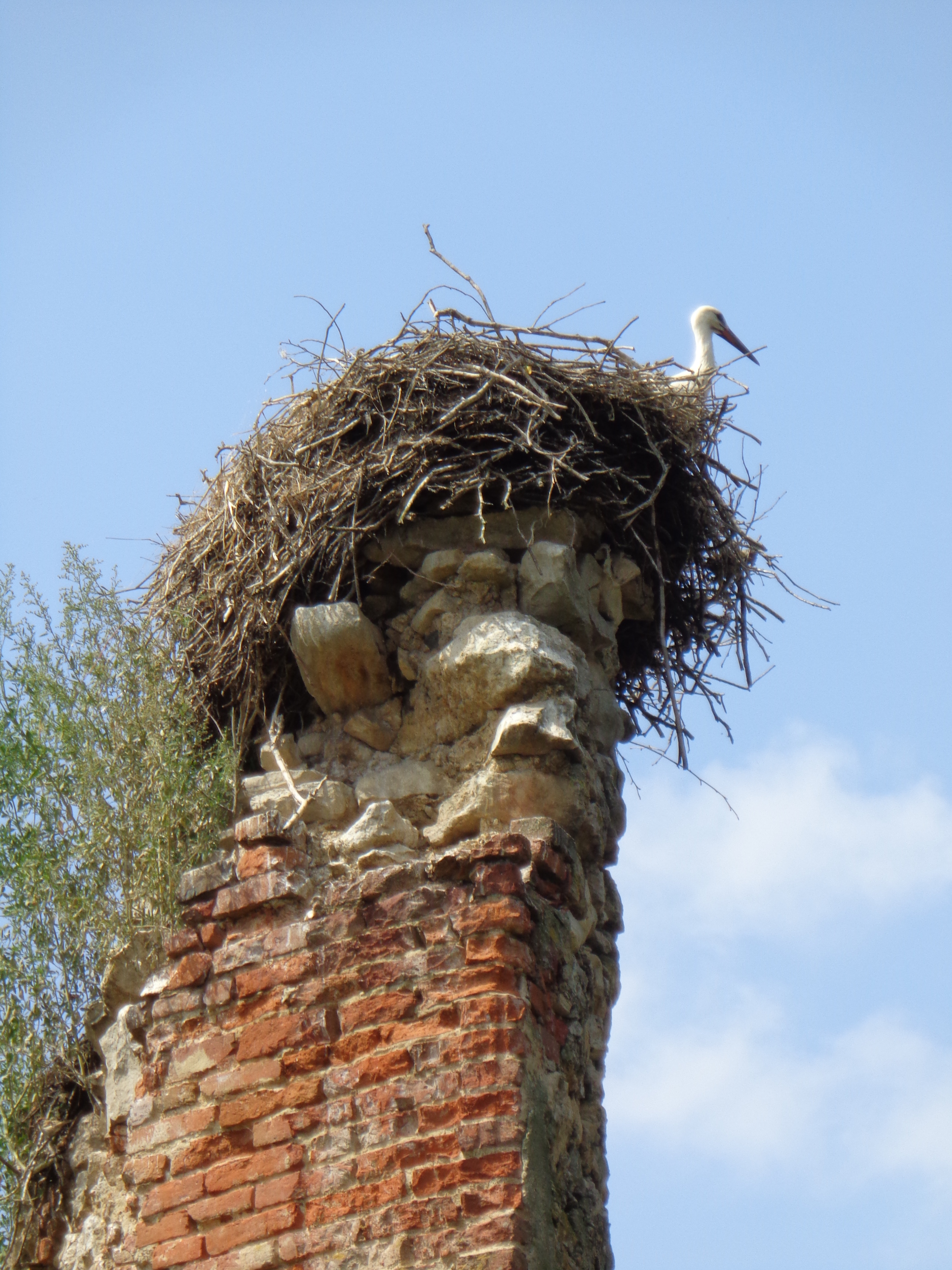
European white stork in a nest in Bisag, Croatia

== Morphology ==
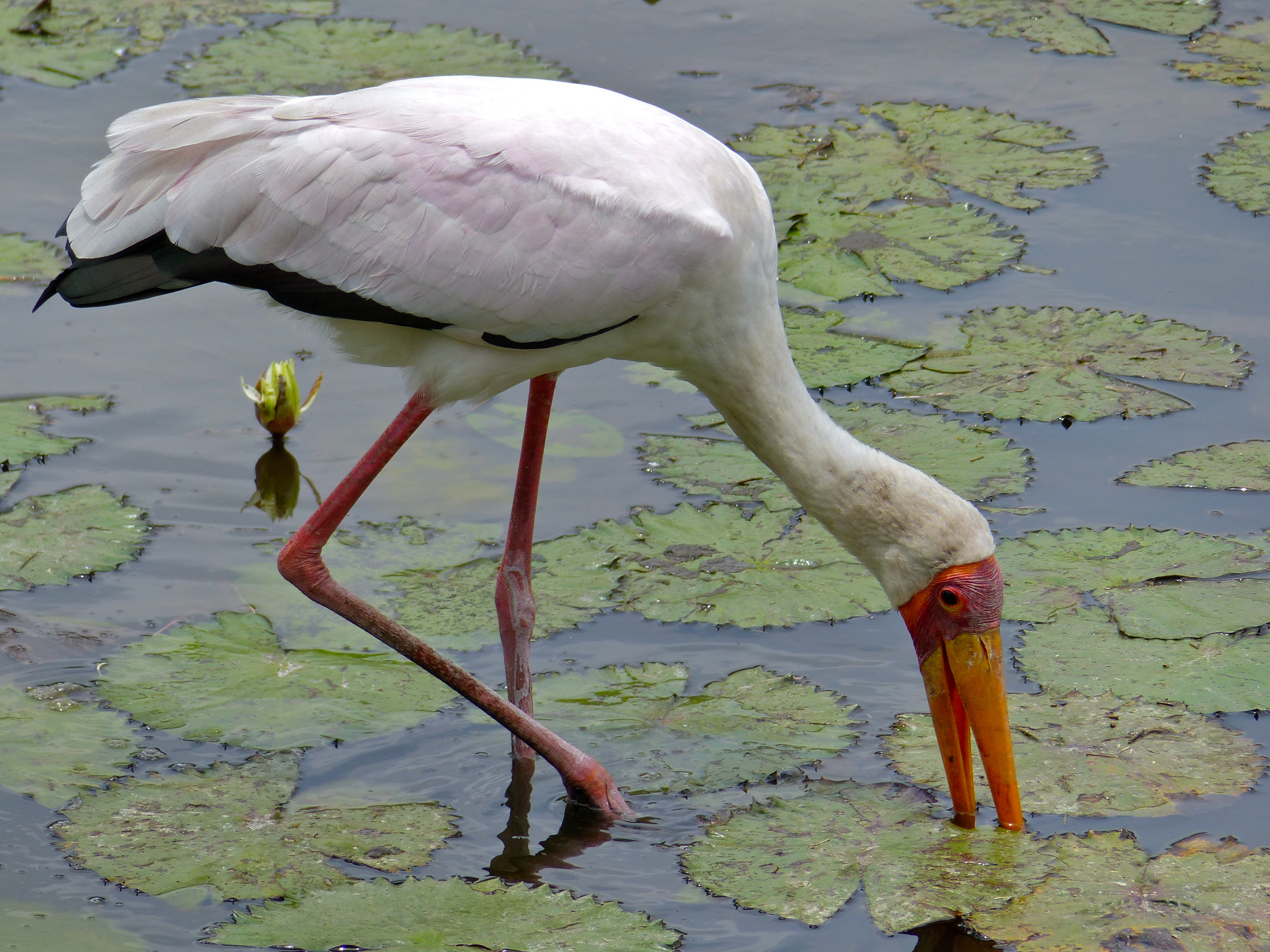
Mycteria storks, like this yellow-billed stork, have sensitive bills that allow them to hunt by touch

Storks range in size from the marabou, which stands 152 cm (60 in) tall and can weigh 8.9 kg (19 1/2 lb), to the Abdim's stork, which is only 75 cm (30 in) high and weighs only 1.3 kg (2 3/4 lb). Their shape is superficially similar to the herons, with long legs and necks, but they are more heavy-set. There is some sexual dimorphism (differences between males and females) in size, with males being up to 15% bigger than females in some species (for example, the saddle-billed stork), but almost no difference in appearance. The only difference is in the colour of the iris of the two species in the genus Ephippiorhynchus.

The bills of storks are large to very large, and vary considerably between the genera. The shape of the bills is linked to the diet of the different species. The large bills of the Ciconia storks are the least specialized. Larger are the massive and slightly upturned bills of the Ephippiorhynchus and the jabiru. These have evolved to hunt for fish in shallow water. Larger still are the massive daggers of the two adjutants and marabou (Leptoptilos), which are used to feed on carrion and in defense against other scavengers, as well as for taking other prey. The long, ibis-like downcurved bills of the Mycteria storks have sensitive tips that allow them to detect prey by touch (tactilocation) where cloudy conditions would not allow them to see it. The most specialised bills of any storks are those of the two openbills (Anastomus), which as their name suggests, is open in the middle when their bill is closed. These bills have evolved to help openbills feed on their primary prey item, aquatic snails.

Although it is sometimes reported that storks lack syrinxes and are mute, they do have syrinxes, and are capable of making some sounds, although they do not do so often. The syrinxes of storks are "variably degenerate" however, and the syringeal membranes of some species are found between tracheal rings or cartilage, an unusual arrangement shared with the ovenbirds.

== Distribution and habitat ==
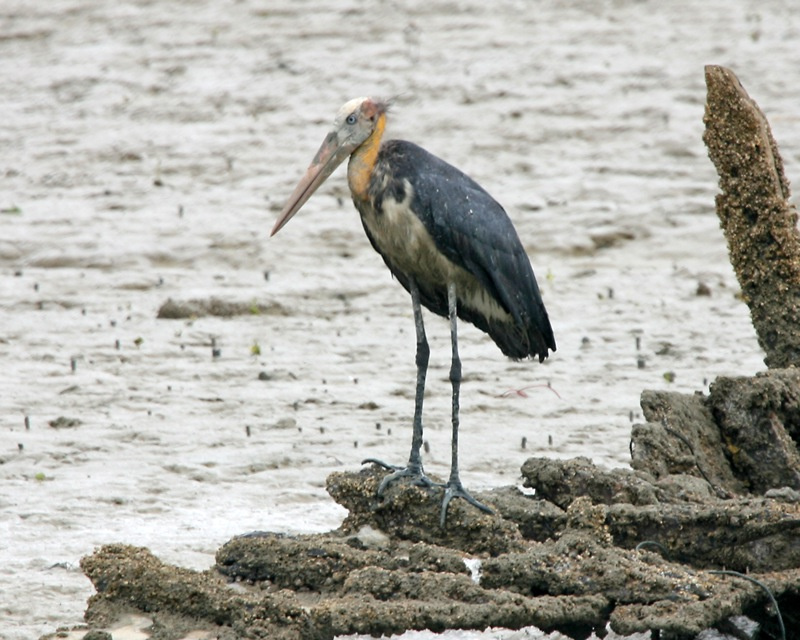
Lesser adjutants will forage in marine habitats, unlike most storks

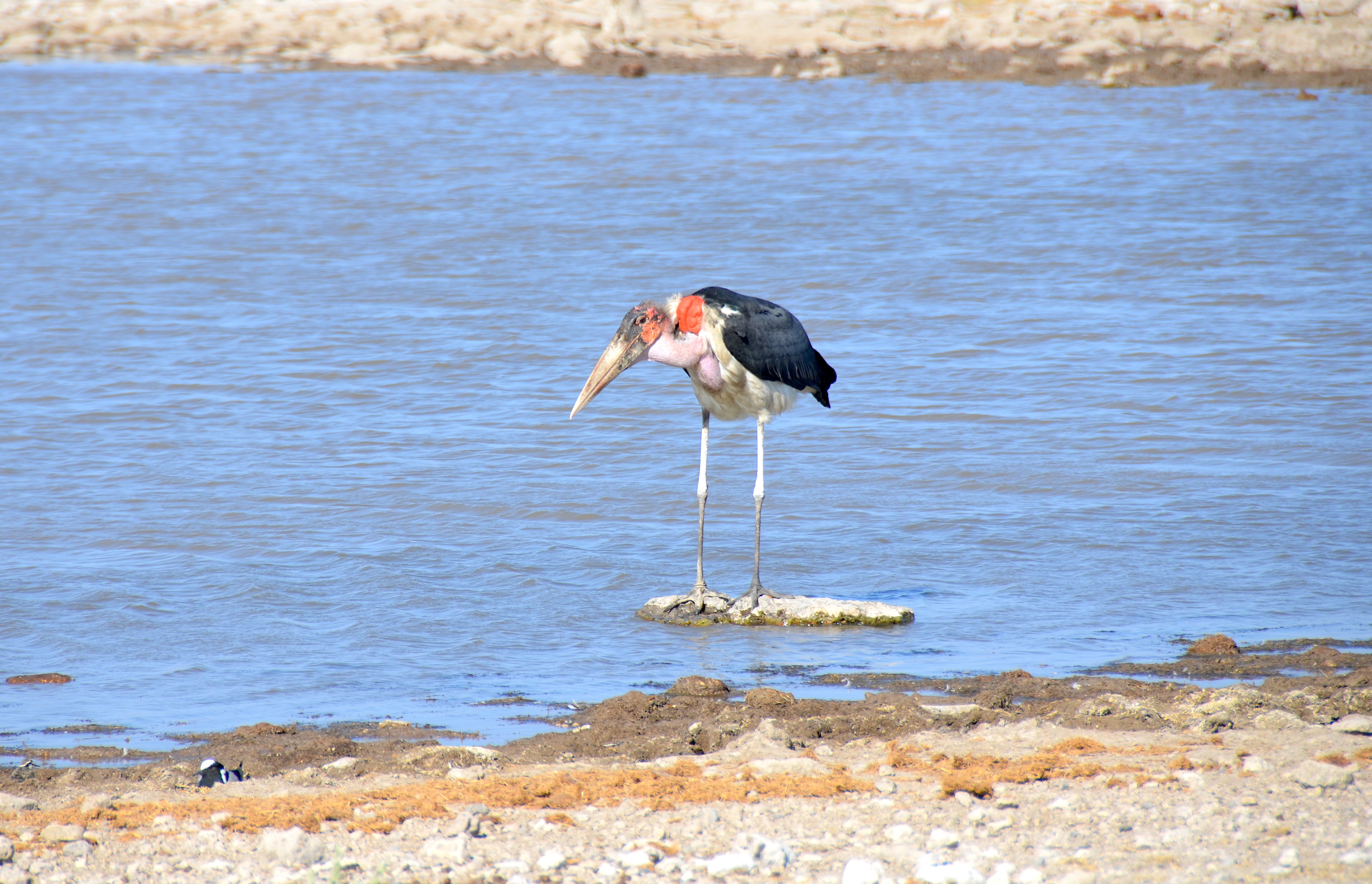
Marabou stork at Etosha National Park in Namibia

Storks have a nearly cosmopolitan distribution, being absent from the poles, most of North America and large parts of Australia. The centres of stork diversity are in tropical Asia and sub-Saharan Africa, with eight and six breeding species respectively. Just three species are present in the New World: wood stork, maguari stork and jabiru, which is the tallest flying bird of the Americas. Two species, white and black stork, reach Europe and western temperate Asia, while one species, Oriental stork, reaches temperate areas of eastern Asia, and one species, black-necked stork, is found in Australasia.

Storks are more diverse and common in the tropics, and the species that live in temperate climates for the most part migrate to avoid the worst of winter. They are fairly diverse in their habitat requirements. Some species, particularly the Mycteria "wood storks" and Anastomus openbills, are highly dependent on water and aquatic prey, but many other species are far less dependent on this habitat type, although they will frequently make use of it. Species like the marabou and Abdim's stork will frequently be found foraging in open grasslands of savannah. Preferred habitats include flooded grasslands, light woodland, marshes and paddyfields, wet meadows, river backwaters and ponds. Many species will select shallow pools, particularly when lakes or rivers are drying out, as they concentrate prey and make it harder for prey to escape, or when monsoonal rainfall increases water depth of larger waterbodies. Some species like the woolly-necked storks and lesser adjutant storks have adapted to changing crops of tropical agricultural landscapes that enables them to remain resident despite the transformations brought about by seasonal crops. In South Africa, the woolly-necked storks have adapted to artificial feeding and now largely nest on trees in gardens with swimming pools.

Less typical habitats include the dense temperate forests used by European black storks, or the rainforest habitat sought by Storm's stork in south-east Asia. They generally avoid marine habitats, with the exception of the lesser adjutant, milky stork and wood stork, all of which forage in mangroves, lagoons and estuarine mudflats. A number of species, especially woolly-necked storks, black-necked storks, Asian openbills, and lesser adjutant Storks in South Asia, have adapted to highly modified human habitats for foraging and breeding. In the absence of persecution several stork species breed close to people, and species such as the marabou, greater adjutant, and white stork feed at landfill sites.

=== Migration and movements ===
Storks vary in their tendency towards migration. Temperate species like the white stork, black stork and Oriental stork undertake long annual migrations in the winter. The routes taken by these species have developed to avoid long-distance travel across water, and from Europe, this usually means flying across the Straits of Gibraltar or east across the Bosphorus and through Israel and the Sinai. Studies of young birds denied the chance to travel with others of their species have shown that these routes are at least partially learnt, rather than being innate as they are in passerine migrants. Migrating black storks are split between those that make stopovers on the migration between Europe and their wintering grounds in Africa, and those that do not.

The Abdim's stork is another migrant, albeit one that migrates within the tropics. It breeds in northern Africa, from Senegal to the Red Sea, during the wet season, and then migrates to Southern Africa. Many species that are not regular migrants will still make smaller movements if circumstances require it; others may migrate over part of their range. This can also include regular commutes from nesting sites to feeding areas. Wood storks have been observed feeding 130 km (80 mi) from their breeding colony.

== Behaviour ==
=== Feeding and diet ===
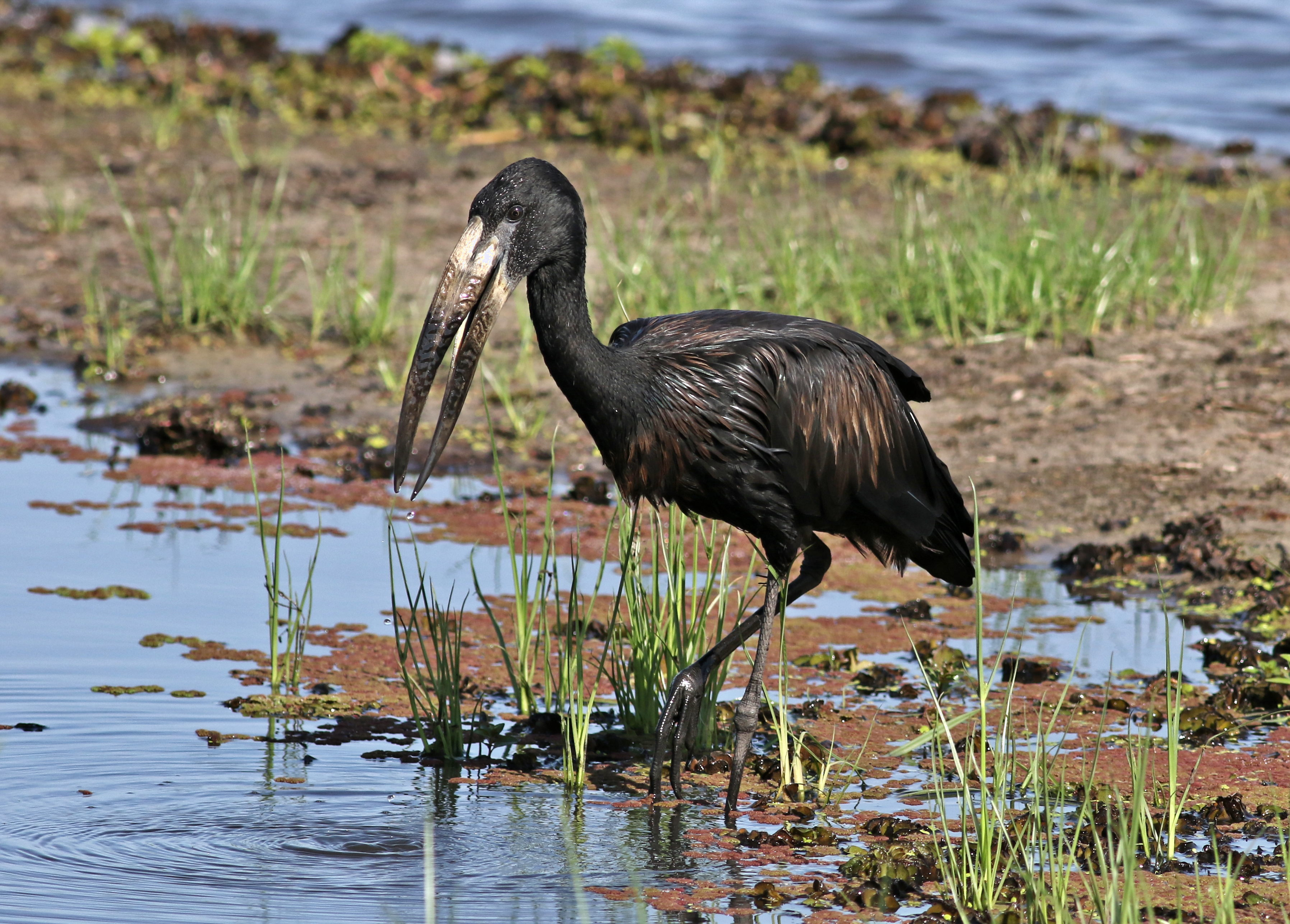
African openbill foraging in shallow water

Storks are carnivorous predators, taking a range of reptiles, small mammals, insects, fish, amphibians and other small invertebrates. Storks usually hunt for animals in shallow water. Any plant material consumed is usually accidental. Mycteria storks are specialists in feeding on aquatic vertebrates, particularly when prey is concentrated by lowering water levels or flooding into shallows. On marine mudflats and mangrove swamps in Sumatra, milky storks feed on mudskippers, probing the burrow with the bill and even the whole head into the mud. The characteristic feeding method involves standing or walking in shallow water and holding the bill submerged in the water. When contact is made with prey, the bill reflexively snaps shut in 25 milliseconds, one of the fastest reactions known in any vertebrate. The reaction is able to distinguish between prey items and inanimate objects like branches, although the exact mechanism is unknown.

Openbills are specialists in freshwater molluscs, particularly apple snails. They feed in small groups, and sometimes African openbills ride on the backs of hippos while foraging. Having caught a snail, it will return to land or at least to the shallows to eat it. The fine tip of the bill of the openbills is used to open the snail, and the saliva has a narcotic effect, which causes the snail to relax and simplifies the process of extraction.

The other genera of storks are more generalised. Ciconia storks are very generalised in their diets, and some species, including Abdim's stork and marabous, will feed in large flocks on swarms of locusts and at wildfires. This is why white storks and Abdim's storks are known as "grasshopper birds". Ephippiorhynchus are carnivorous, though they have a very diverse diet when living in human-modified habitats such as agricultural landscapes. The foraging method used by the generalists is to stalk or walk across grassland or shallow water, watching for prey.

=== Breeding ===
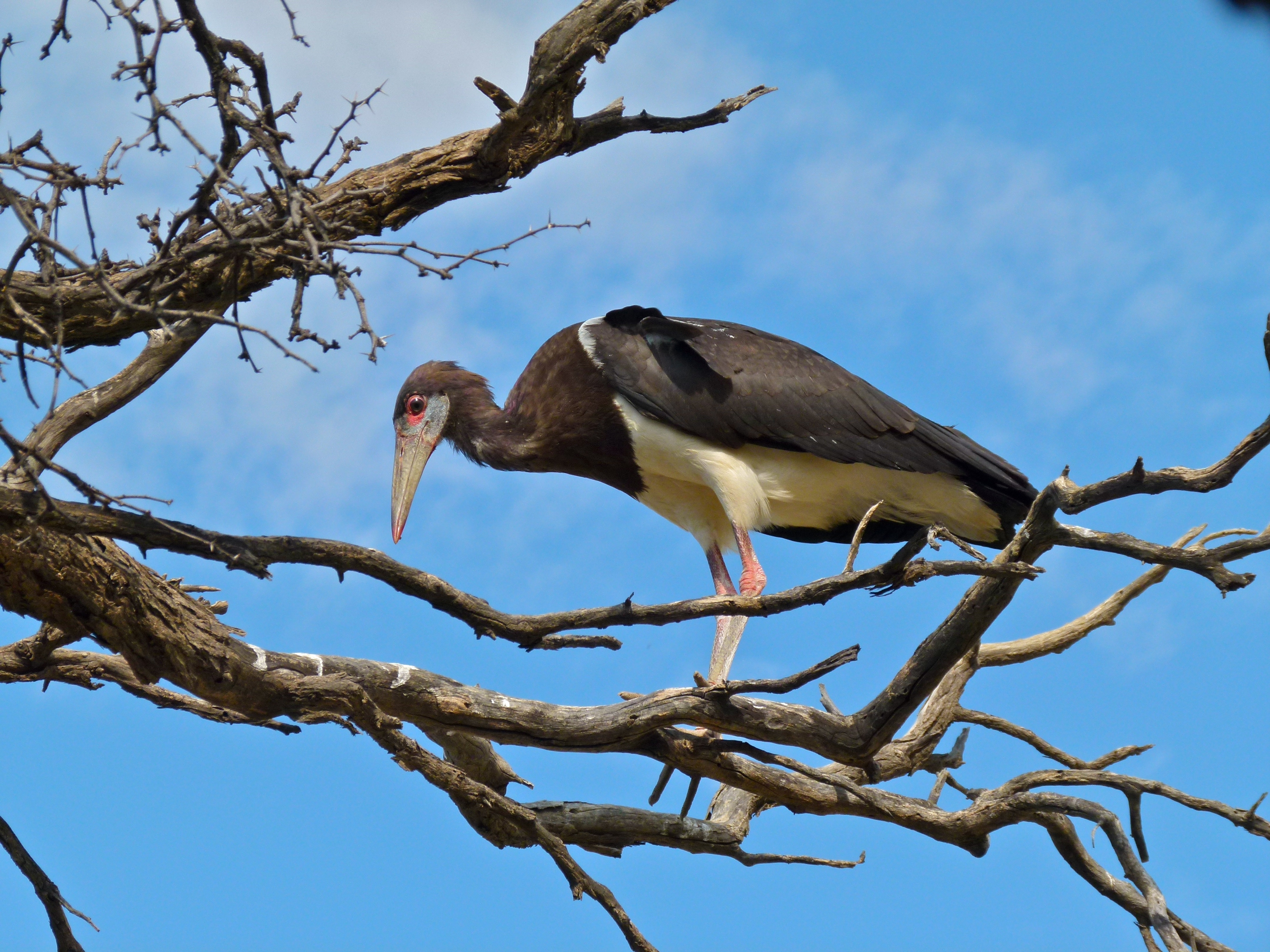
Abdim's storks are regular intra-African migrants

Storks range from being solitary breeders through loose breeding associations to fully colonial. The jabiru, Ephippiorhynchus storks and several species of Ciconia are entirely solitary when breeding. In contrast the Mycteria storks, Abdim's stork, openbills and Leptoptilos storks breed in colonies which can range from a couple of pairs to thousands. Many of these species breed in colonies with other waterbirds, which can include other species of storks, herons and egrets, pelicans, cormorants and ibises. White storks, Oriental storks and Maguari storks are all loosely colonial, and may breed in nests that are within visual range of others of the same species, but have little to do with one another. They also may nest solitarily, and the reasons why they choose to nest together or apart are not understood. Storks use trees in a variety of habitats to breed, including forests, cities, farmlands and large wetlands.

== In culture ==
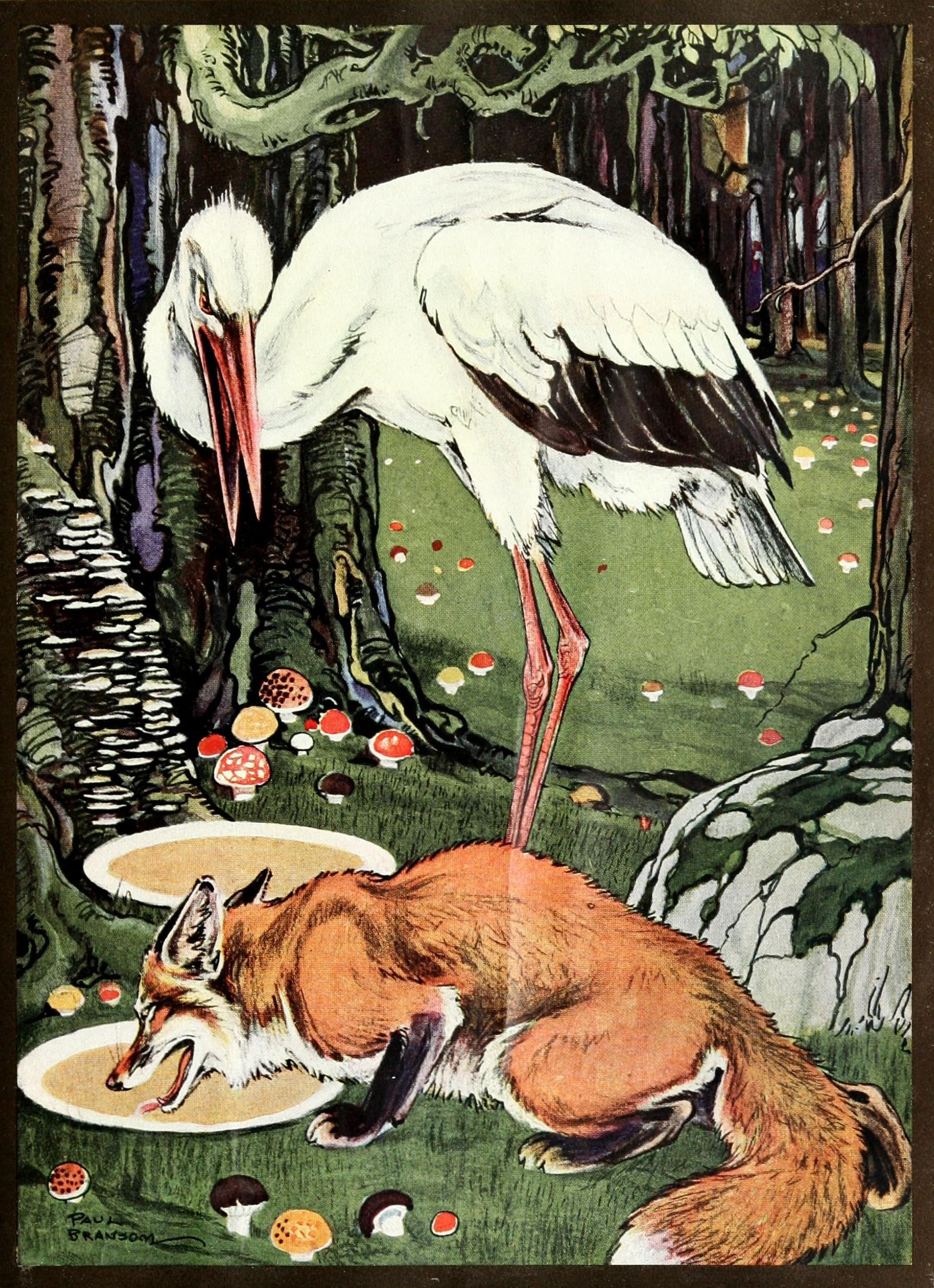
Storks feature in several of Aesop's Fables, such as The Fox and the Stork

Many ancient mythologies feature stories and legends involving storks. In Ancient Egypt, saddle-billed storks were seen as being amongst the most powerful animals and were used to represent the ba, the Ancient Egyptian conception of the soul, during the Old Kingdom. Bennu, an Egyptian deity that was later the inspiration for the phoenix, may also have been inspired by a stork, although it was more likely an ibis or heron.

Greek and Roman mythology portrays storks as models of parental devotion. The 3rd century Roman writer Aelian, citing the authority of Alexander of Myndus, noted in his De natura animalium (book 3, chapter 23) that aged storks flew away to oceanic islands where they were transformed into humans as a reward for their piety towards their parents. Storks were also thought to care for their aged parents, feeding them and even transporting them, and children's books depicted them as a model of filial values. A Greek law called Pelargonia, from the Ancient Greek word pelargos for stork, required citizens to take care of their aged parents. The Greeks also held that killing a stork could be punished with death.

Storks feature in several of Aesop's Fables, most notably in The Farmer and the Stork, The Fox and the Stork, and The Frogs Who Desired a King. The first fable involves a stork caught with a group of cranes eating grain in a farmer's field, with the moral that those who associate with wicked people can be held accountable for their crimes. The Fox and the Stork involves a fox who invites a stork for dinner and provides soup in a dish that the stork cannot drink from, and is in turn invited for dinner by the stork and given food in a narrow jug which he cannot access. It cautions readers to follow the principle of do no harm. The third fable involves a group of frogs that are dissatisfied with the king that Zeus has given them, an inanimate log, and who are then punished with a new King Stork (a water-snake in some versions) who eats the frogs. King Stork has subsequently entered the English language as a term for a particularly tyrannical ruler.

=== Associations with fertility ===
According to European folklore, the white stork is responsible for bringing babies to new parents. The legend is very ancient, but was popularised by an 1839 Hans Christian Andersen story called "The Storks". German folklore held that storks found babies in caves or marshes and brought them to households in a basket on their backs or held in their beaks. These caves contained Adebarsteine or "stork stones". The babies would then be given to the mother or dropped down the chimney. Households would signal their desire for children by leaving sweets for the stork on the windowsill. Subsequently, the folklore has spread around the world to the Philippines and countries in South America. Birthmarks on the back of the head of newborn babies, nevus flammeus nuchae, are sometimes referred to as stork-bite. In Slavic mythology and pagan religion, storks were thought to carry unborn souls from Vyraj to Earth in spring and summer. This belief still persists in the modern folk culture of many Slavic countries, in the simplified child story that "storks bring children into the world".

Famous is the role that the fable played in historical development of psychoanalysis: the name 'chimney sweeping', which the first of all patients gave to her talking cure, is a free association with the place through which the bird used to bring babies into house. Psychoanalyst Marvin Margolis suggests the enduring nature of the stork fable of the newborn is linked to its addressing a psychological need, in that it allays the discomfort of discussing sex and procreation with children. Birds have long been associated with the maternal symbols from pagan goddesses such as Juno, to the Holy Ghost, and the stork may have been chosen for its white plumage (depicting purity), size, and flight at high altitude (likened to flying between Earth and Heaven).

There were negative aspects to stork folklore as well; a Polish folktale relates how God made the stork's plumage white, while the Devil gave it black wings, imbuing it with both good and evil impulses. They were also associated with handicapped or stillborn babies in Germany, explained as the stork having dropped the baby en route to the household, or as revenge or punishment for past wrongdoing. A mother who was confined to bed around the time of childbirth was said to have been "bitten" by the stork. In Denmark, storks were said to toss a nestling off the nest and then an egg in successive years. In medieval England, storks were also associated with adultery, possibly inspired by their courtship rituals. Their preening and posture saw them linked with the attribute of self-conceit. Children of African American slaves were sometimes told that white babies were brought by storks, while black babies were born from buzzard eggs.

=== As food ===
Storks have never been a particularly common food, but occasionally featured in medieval banquets. They may also have been eaten in Ancient Egypt.
