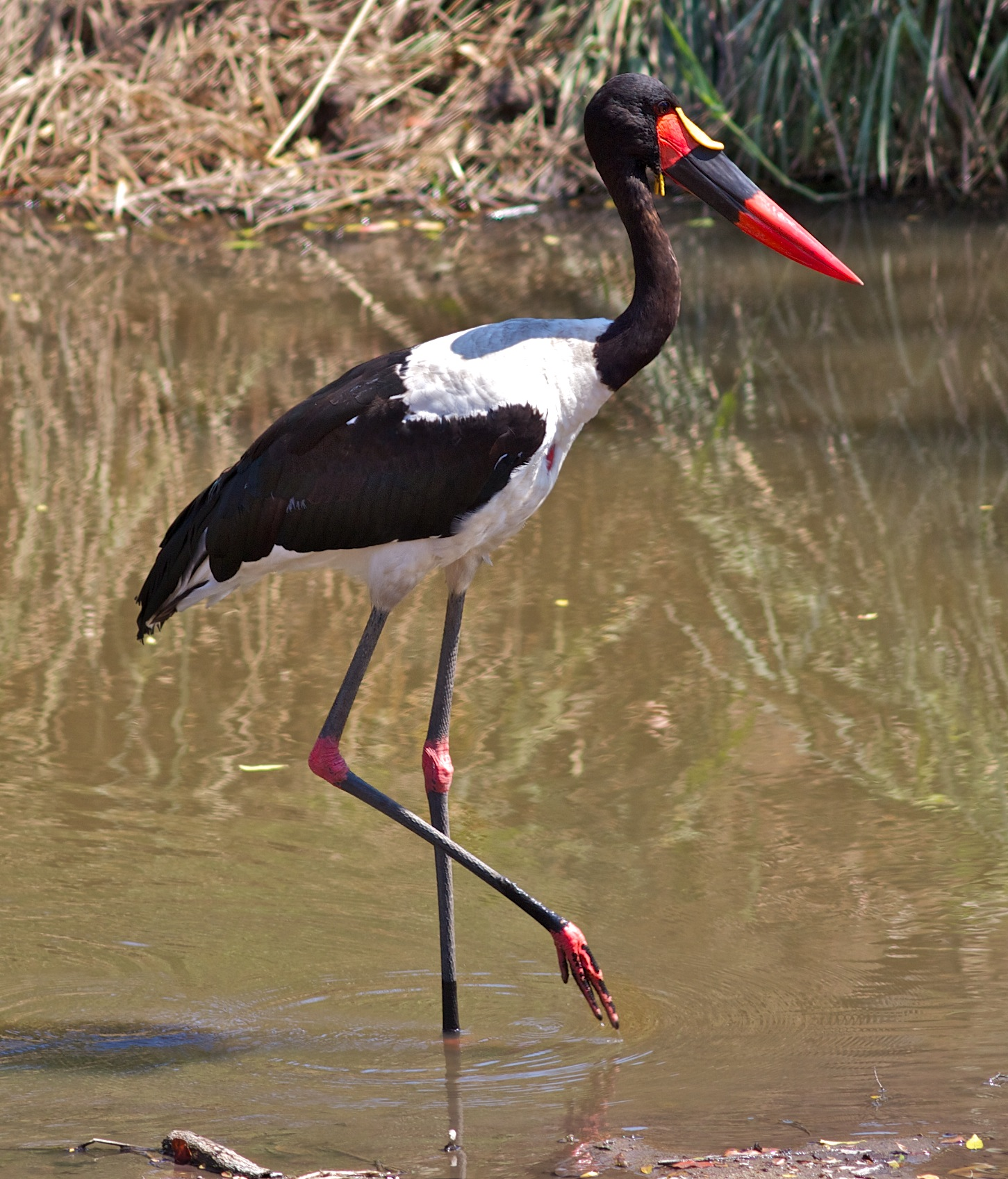
- Saddle-billed stork, Ephippiorhynchus senegalensis

Scientific classification
- Kingdom: Animalia
- Phylum: Chordata
- Class: Aves
- Order: Ciconiiformes
- Family: Ciconiidae
- Genus: Ephippiorhynchus; Bonaparte, 1855

Type species
- Ciconia ephippiorhyncha = Mycteria senegalensis Temminck, 1824

= Ephippiorhynchus =

Ephippiorhynchus Temporal range: Late Miocene to Recent

Genus of birds

Ephippiorhynchus is a small genus of storks. It contains two living species only, very large birds more than 140 cm tall with a 230–270 cm wingspan. Both are mainly black and white, with huge bills. The sexes of these species are similarly plumaged, but the eyes are dark brown in males and yellow in females. The members of this genus are sometimes called "jabirus", but this properly refers to a close relative from Latin America.

These large wading birds breed in marshes and other wetlands, building a large, deep stick nest in a tree. Like most storks, they fly with the neck outstretched, not retracted like a heron; in flight, they present a strange shape, with the head and large bill somewhat drooping down. They are silent except for bill-clattering at the nest.

Ephippiorhynchus storks, like most of their relatives, feed mainly on fish, frogs and crabs, but also on young birds and other land vertebrates. They move in a deliberate and stately manner as they hunt, in a similar way to the larger heron.

These birds are not infrequently kept in captivity by zoos or aviculturalists. Individuals occasionally escape, and these have been proposed to be responsible for sightings of "big bird" cryptids; the saddle-billed stork is the most likely basis for the kongamato cryptid.

The genus name Ephippiorhynchus is derived from Ancient Greek ephippos, a saddle (literally "something which is placed on a horse"), and rhynchus, "bill", and refers to the frontal shield which saddles the bill of one species.

== Species ==
There are two extant species:

Genus Ephippiorhynchus – Bonaparte, 1855 – two species
| Common name | Scientific name and subspecies | Range | Size and ecology | IUCN status and estimated population |
|---|---|---|---|---|
| Saddle-billed stork | Ephippiorhynchus senegalensis (Shaw, 1800) | sub-Saharan Africa | Size: Habitat: Diet: | NT |
| Black-necked stork | Ephippiorhynchus asiaticus (Latham, 1790) | tropical Asia and Australia | Size: Habitat: Diet: | LC |

A prehistoric relative, Ephippiorhynchus pakistanensis, has been described from Late Miocene fossils found in Pakistan. At about the same time, another now-extinct species, Ephippiorhynchus tchoufour, occurred in eastern to central Africa.
