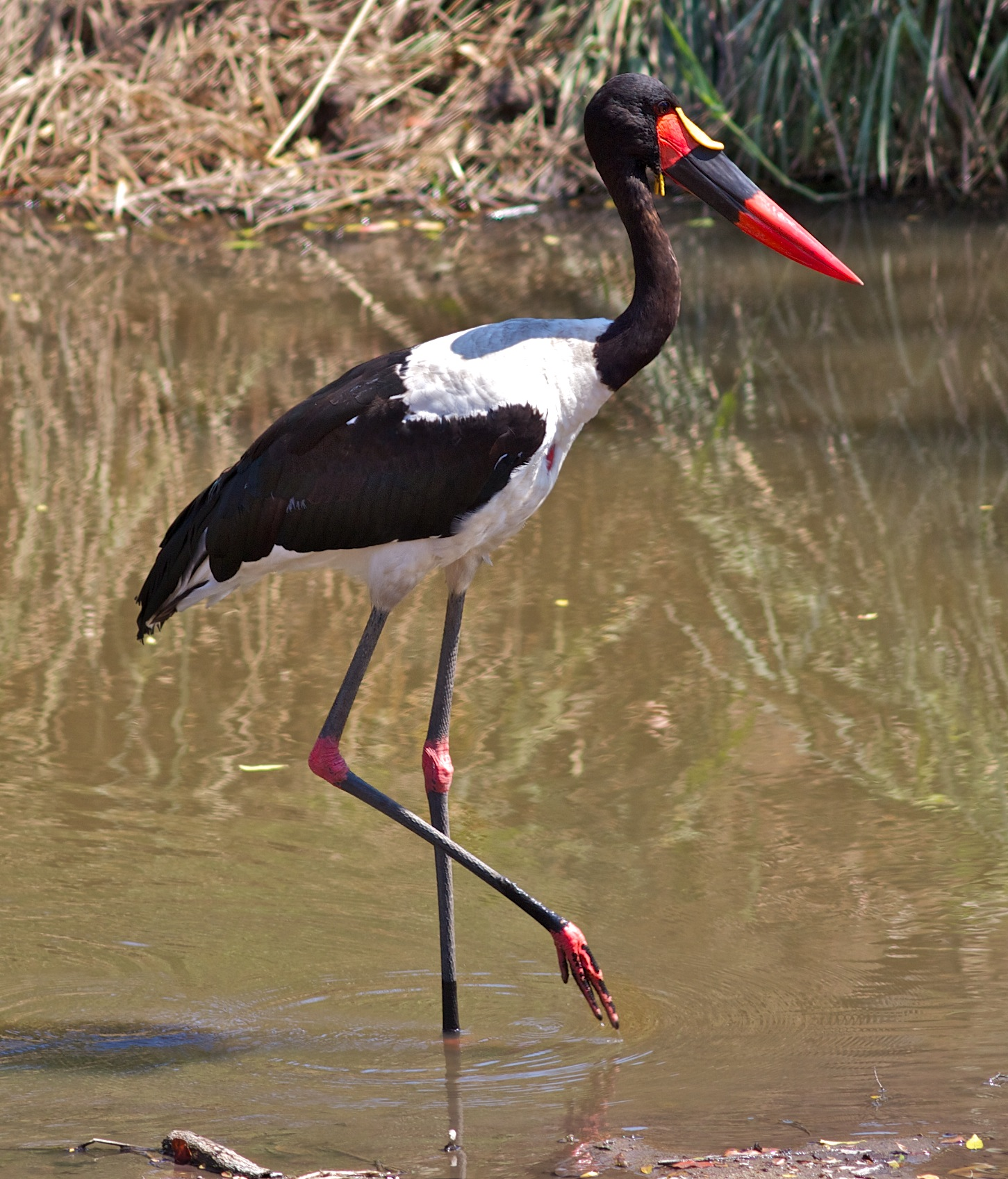
- Adult male in Kruger National Park, South Africa
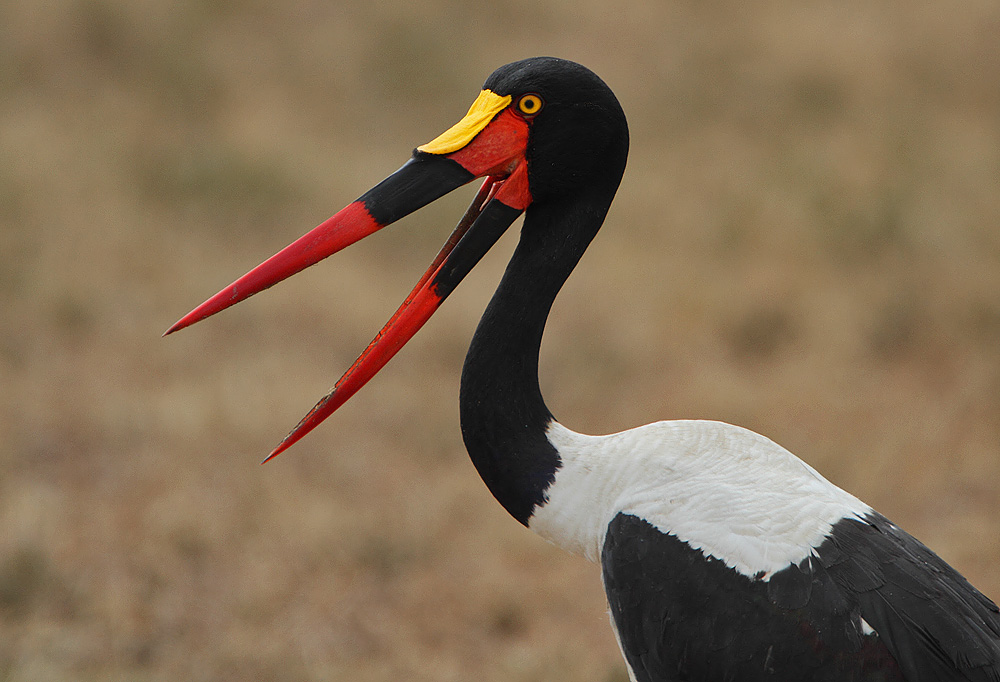
- Female in Masai Mara, Kenya – irises are yellow

Conservation status
- Near Threatened (IUCN 3.1)

Scientific classification
- Kingdom: Animalia
- Phylum: Chordata
- Class: Aves
- Order: Ciconiiformes
- Family: Ciconiidae
- Genus: Ephippiorhynchus
- Species: E. senegalensis

Binomial name
- Ephippiorhynchus senegalensis (Shaw, 1800)

Synonyms
- Mycteria senegalensis Shaw, 1800

= Saddle-billed stork =

Species of bird

The saddle-billed stork or saddlebill (Ephippiorhynchus senegalensis) is a large wading bird in the stork family, Ciconiidae. It is a widespread species which is a resident breeder in sub-Saharan Africa from Sudan, Ethiopia, and Kenya south to South Africa and in the Gambia, Senegal, Côte d'Ivoire, and Chad in west Africa. It is considered endangered in South Africa.

It is a close relative of the widespread Asian and Australian black-necked stork, the only other member of the genus Ephippiorhynchus.

== Description ==
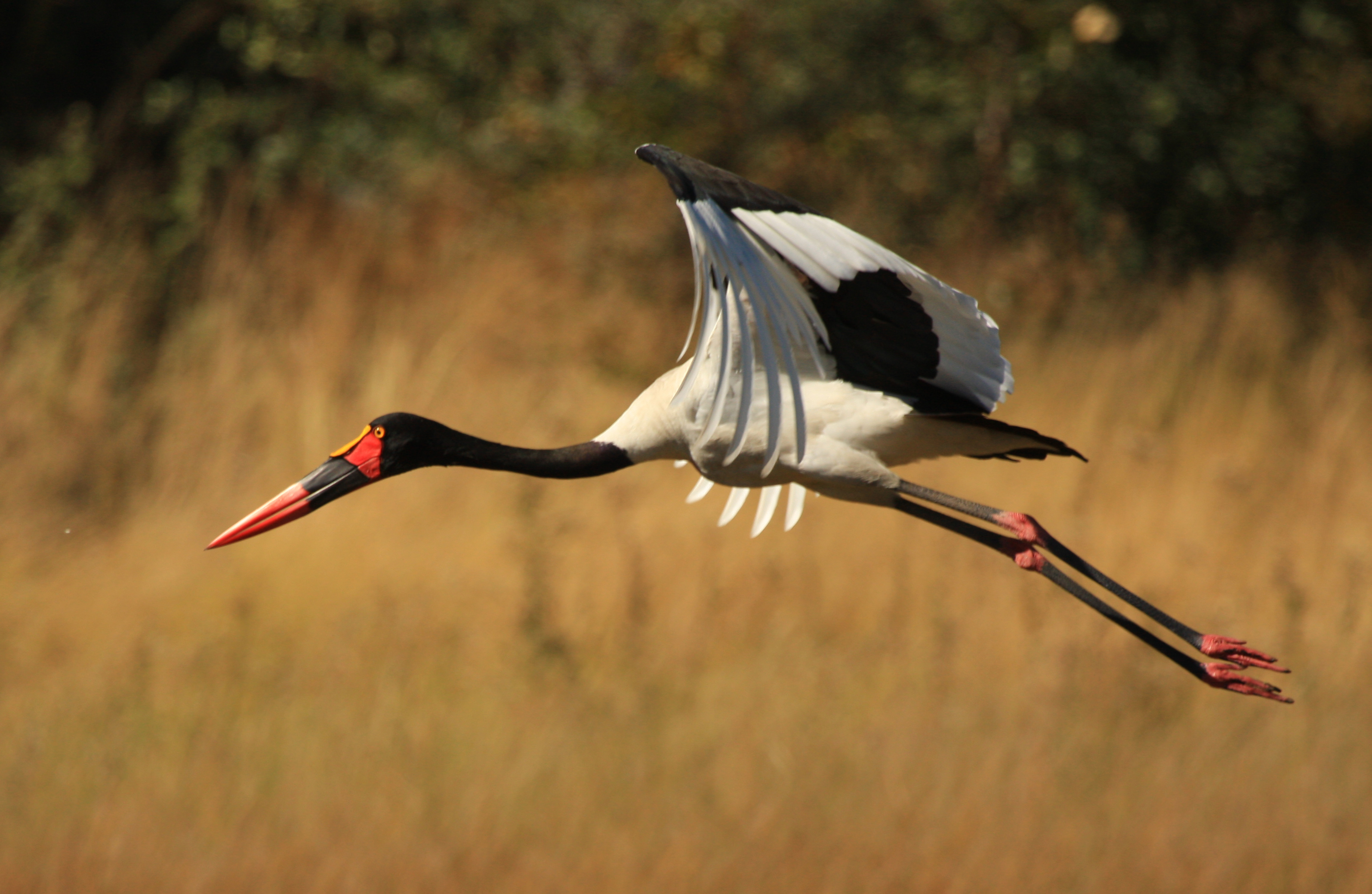
In flight

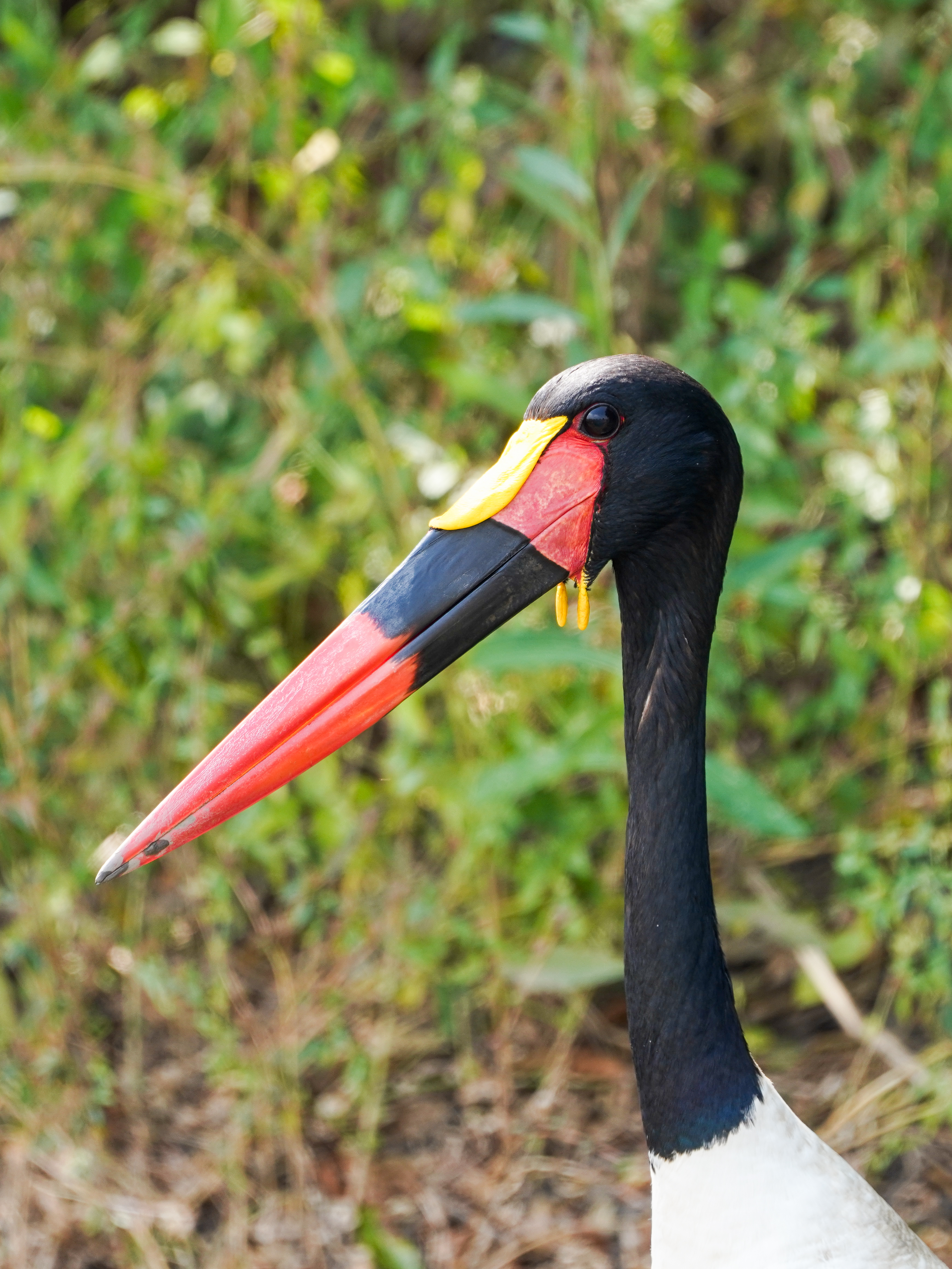
Head of male showing distinctive iris and yellow wattles, Zambia

The saddle-billed stork is a huge bird that regularly attains a height of 145 to 150 cm (4 ft 9 in to 4 ft 11 in), a length of 142 cm (4 ft 8 in), and a 2.4 to 2.7 m (7 ft 10 in to 8 ft 10 in) wingspan. While heights published have been in the aforementioned narrow range, reportedly adult saddle-billed storks in captivity can attain a height of up to 150 to 180 cm (4 ft 11 in to 5 ft 11 in). The male is larger and heavier than the female, with a range of 5.1–7.52 kg (11.2–16.6 lb), with a mean mass of 6.38 kg (14.1 lb). The female is usually between 5 and 6.84 kg (11.0 and 15.1 lb), with a mean mass of 5.95 kg (13.1 lb). Among the large storks, the saddle-billed broadly overlap in size with the two larger Leptoptilos and the Jabiru stork, but possesses a longer, more slender neck and slightly longer legs than the other largest storks, so the saddle-bill is likely to be the tallest extant species of the family. Its extremely long legs measure up to 36.5 cm (14.4 in)) in tarsus length. The long bill measures from 27.3 to 36 cm (10.7 to 14.2 in). The sexes can be readily distinguished by the golden yellow irises of the female and the brown irises and dangling yellow wattles of the male, so is one of the few storks to display sexual dimorphism in colour.

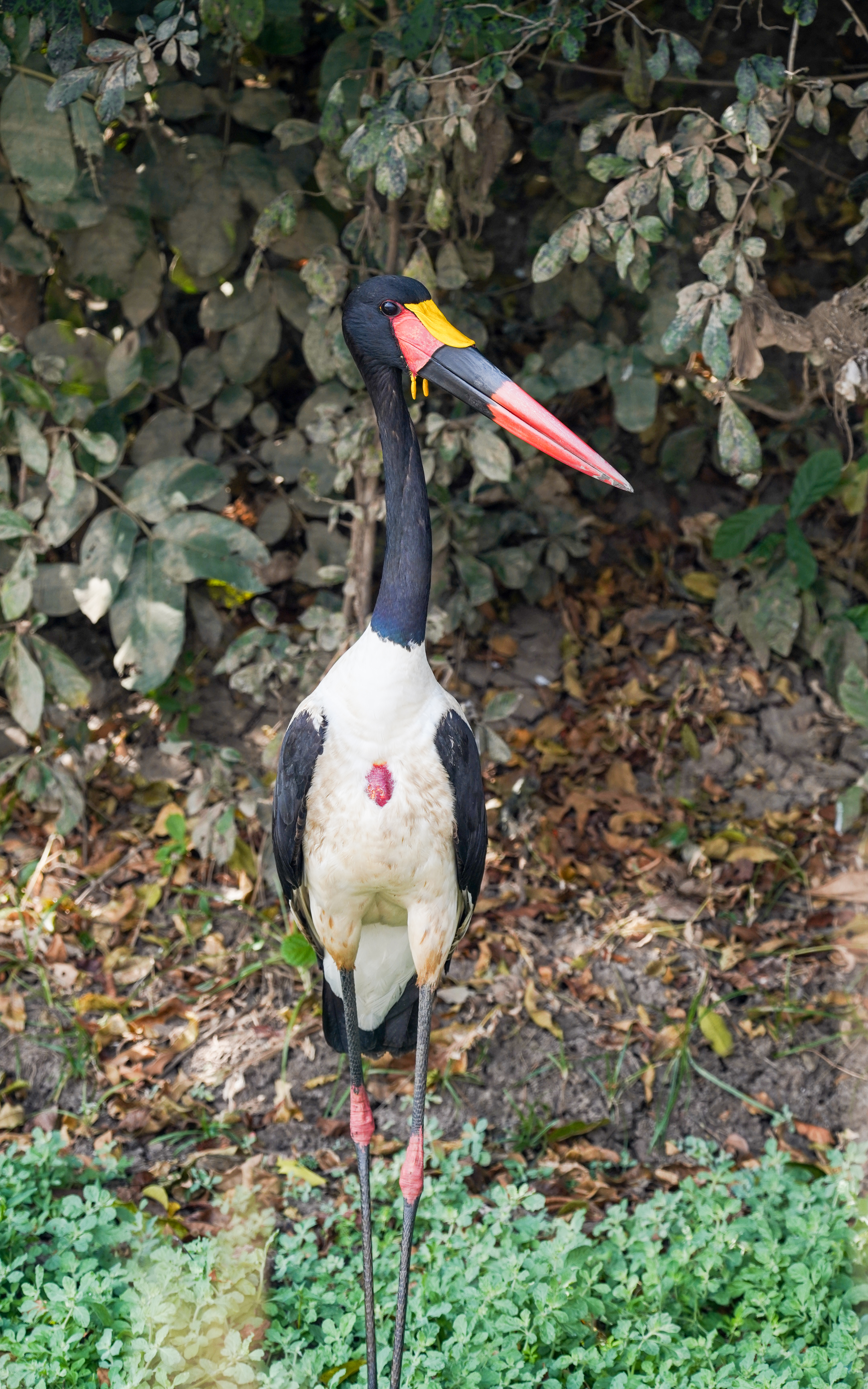
Front view showing red patch on chest, Zambia

It is spectacularly plumaged; both the female and male appear identical when perched, but the female shows much more white in the primaries in flight. The head, neck, back, wings, and tail are iridescent black, with the rest of the body and the primary flight feathers being white. Juveniles are browner grey in plumage. The massive bill is red with a black band and a yellow frontal shield (the "saddle"). The legs and feet are black with pink hocks. On the chest is a bare red patch of skin, whose colour darkens during breeding season.

== Behaviour ==
The saddle-billed stork is silent except for bill-clattering at the nest. Like most storks, it flies with its neck outstretched, not retracted like a heron; in flight, the large, heavy bill is kept drooping somewhat below belly height, giving it a distinctive appearance. This makes it easily recognizable, even if seen from a distance. Due to the large size and unusual appearance in flight, this species is suggested to be the basis for the "big bird" and kongamato cryptids.

=== Habitat ===
At the continental scale, the saddle-billed stork prefers protected areas that have a higher extent of open water compared to areas without other storks. Some of these trends may, however, be due to a bias in coverage by ornithologists of safer areas such as national parks and protected swamps that afford easier accessibility and comforts.

=== Breeding ===
The saddle-billed stork is a solitary nester, building massive nest platforms that are used repeatedly in successive seasons. Unlike many other storks, this species is often seen in pairs in the nonbreeding season, suggesting a lifelong pair bond. It breeds in forested wetlands and other floodplains in tropical lowlands. It builds a large, deep stick nest in a tree, laying one to five (typically two or three) white eggs weighing about 146 g (5.1 oz) each. The incubation period is 30–35 days, with another 70–100 days before the chicks fledge, with the young often remaining in the parents' territory until the next breeding season.

=== Food and feeding ===
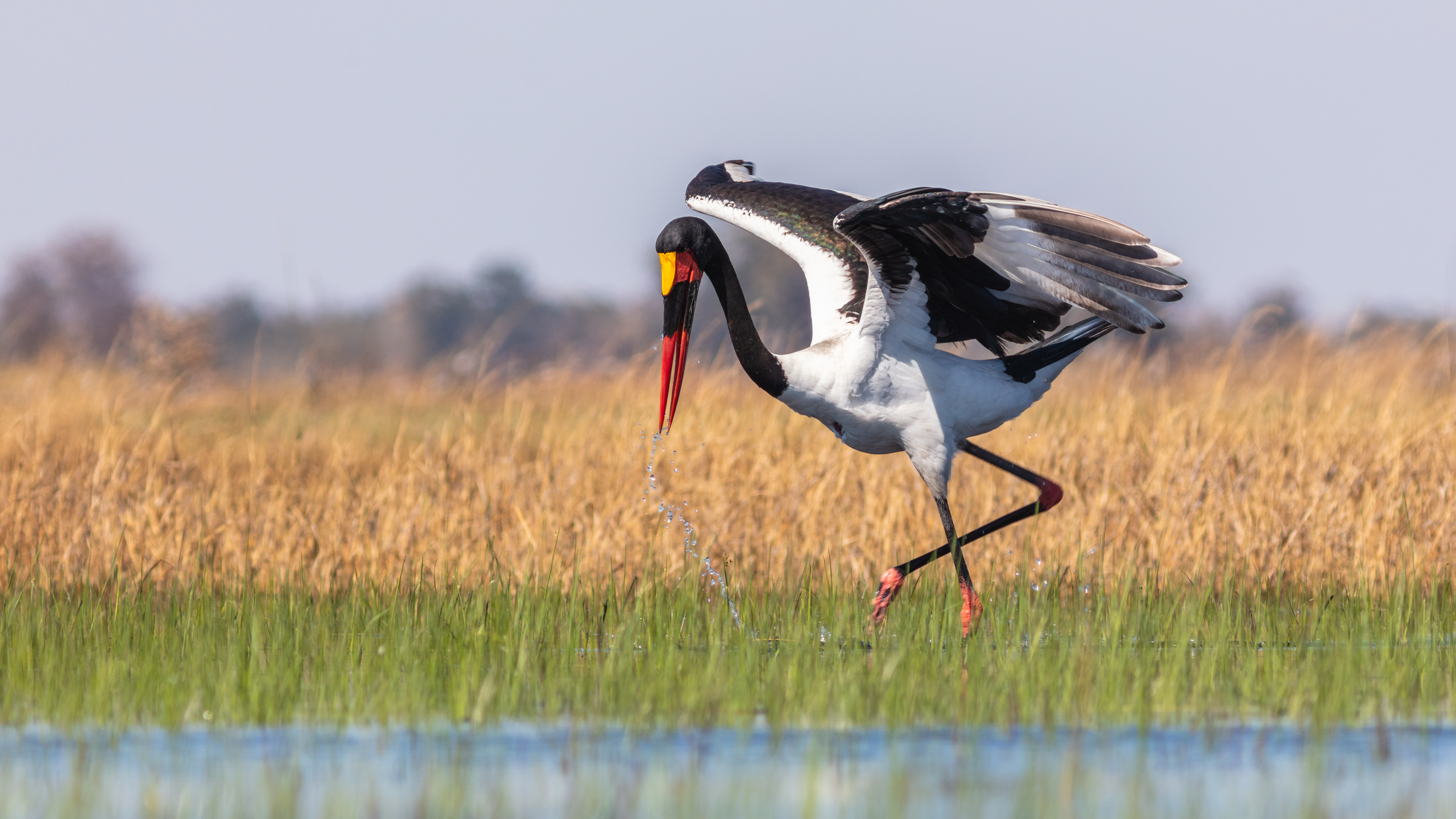
Fishing in Botswana

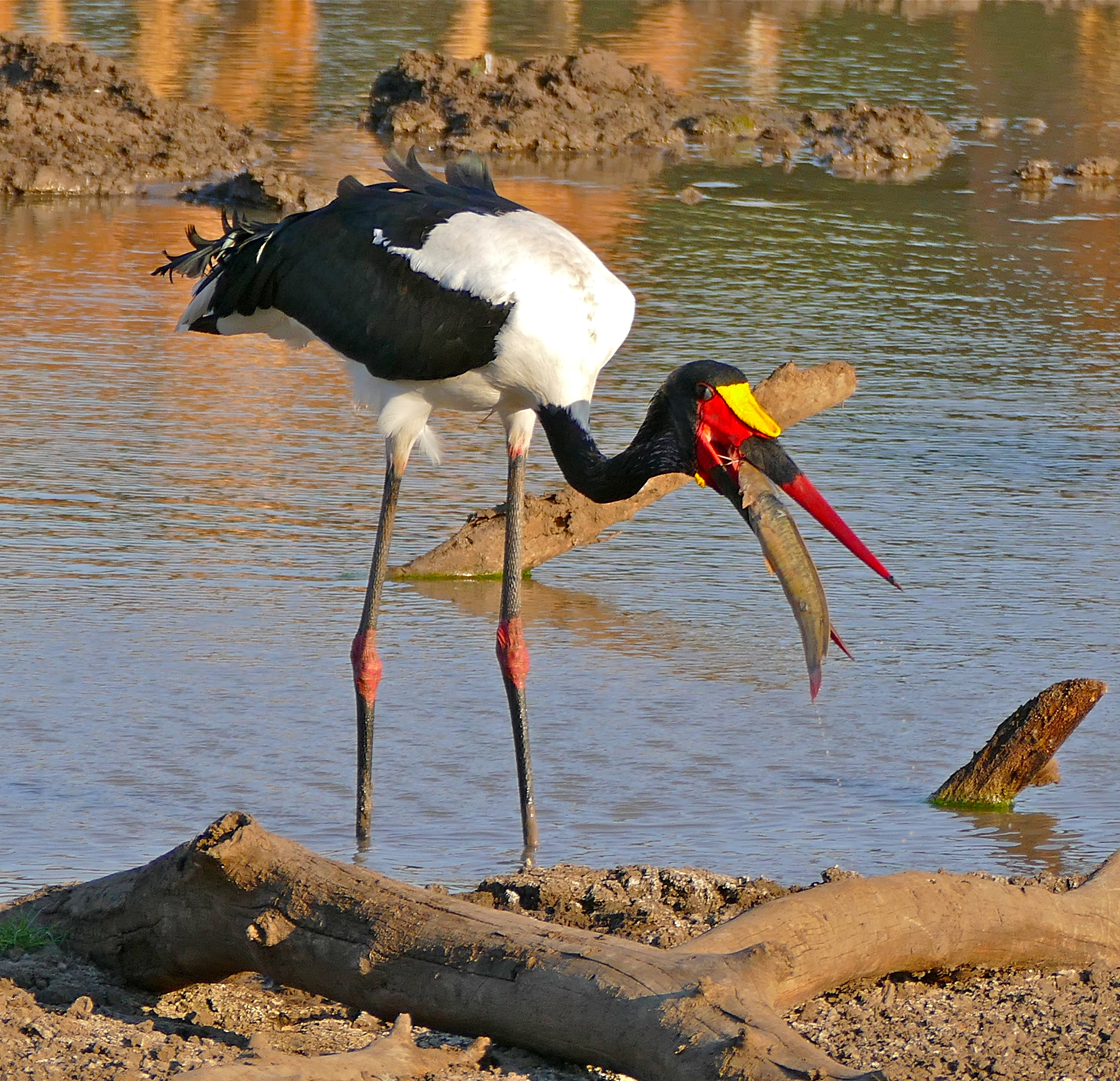
Male trying to swallow a catfish, Mapungubwe National Park, South Africa

The saddle-billed stork searches for prey by stabbing its bill into the water, catching prey by contact, and in the same way into mud and vegetation. It also hunts by visual detection. In one study with 255 minutes of observation, 71% of successful catches were due to visual foraging, and 29% were due to tactile foraging. It usually feeds on aquatic prey such as fish, lungfish (Protopterus spp.), and catfish (Clarias spp.), up to 1.3 kg (2.9 lb) in weight. It swallows the fish head first and then drinks some water. In the case of large fish prey, the fish is often taken to the shore, where pectoral fins may be clipped off before the fish is swallowed head first. The saddle-billed stork opportunistically catches other prey such as frogs, snails, small mammals, birds, snakes, and insects such as grasshoppers, termites, and water beetles. In an unusual case, a saddle-billed stork killed and consumed a red-billed duck (Anas erythrorhyncha) and a spitting cobra (Naja mossambica). An unsuccessful attack on the slender mongoose (Galerella sanguinea) has been reported.

== Relation to Ancient Egyptian culture ==
The saddle-billed stork is represented in an Ancient Egyptian hieroglyph (Gardiner G29) that had the phonetic value "bꜣ":

G29

Its description is often erroneously given as "jabiru", which is a South American relative. The Third Dynasty pharaoh Khaba incorporated this hieroglyph in his name. The first depictions of the species come from during the Late Predynastic period (pre-3150 BC), and trends in depictions have been useful to deduce a decline in the species' range from ancient Egypt likely due to intensifying urbanisation and an increasingly arid climate (circa 2686–2181 BC).
