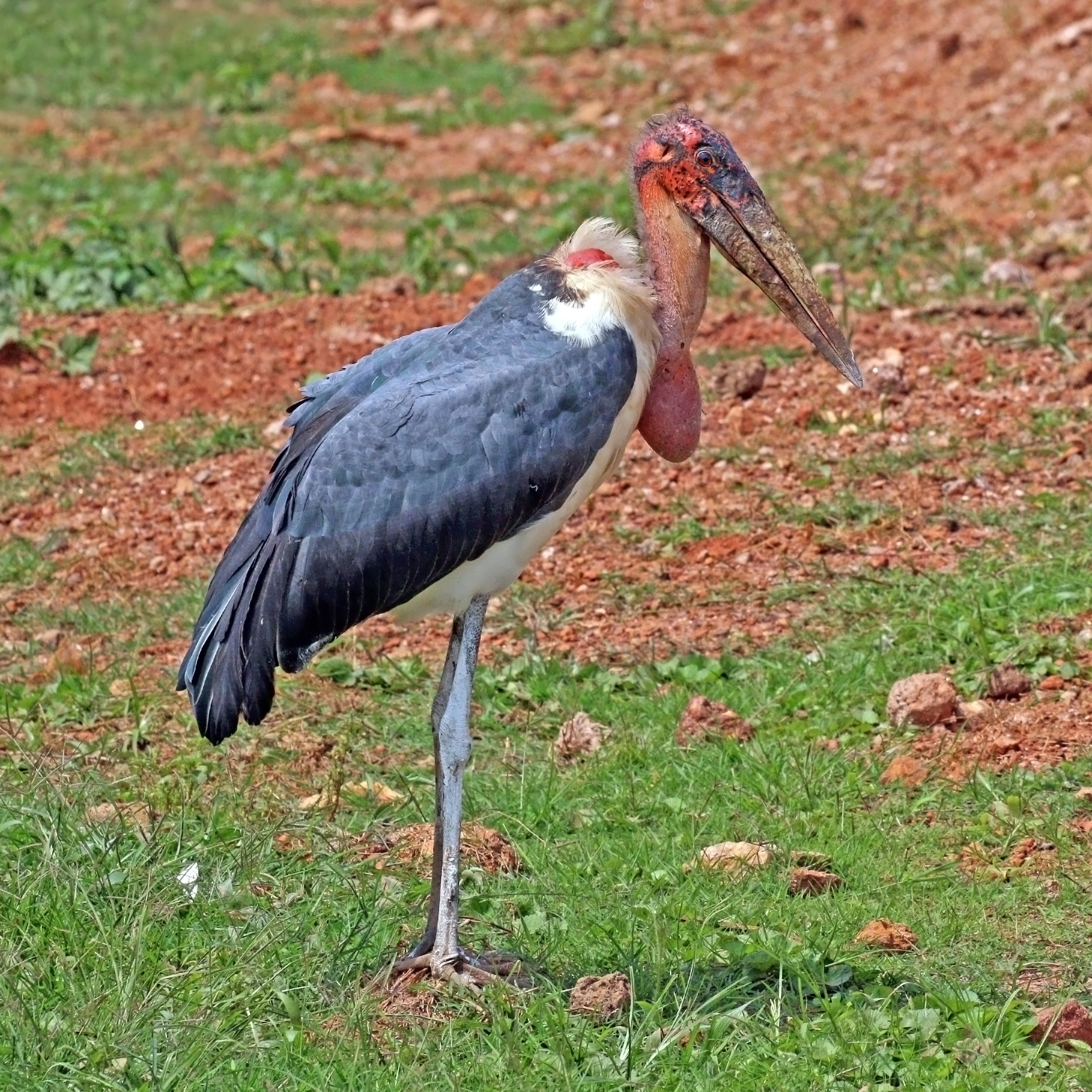
- Uganda
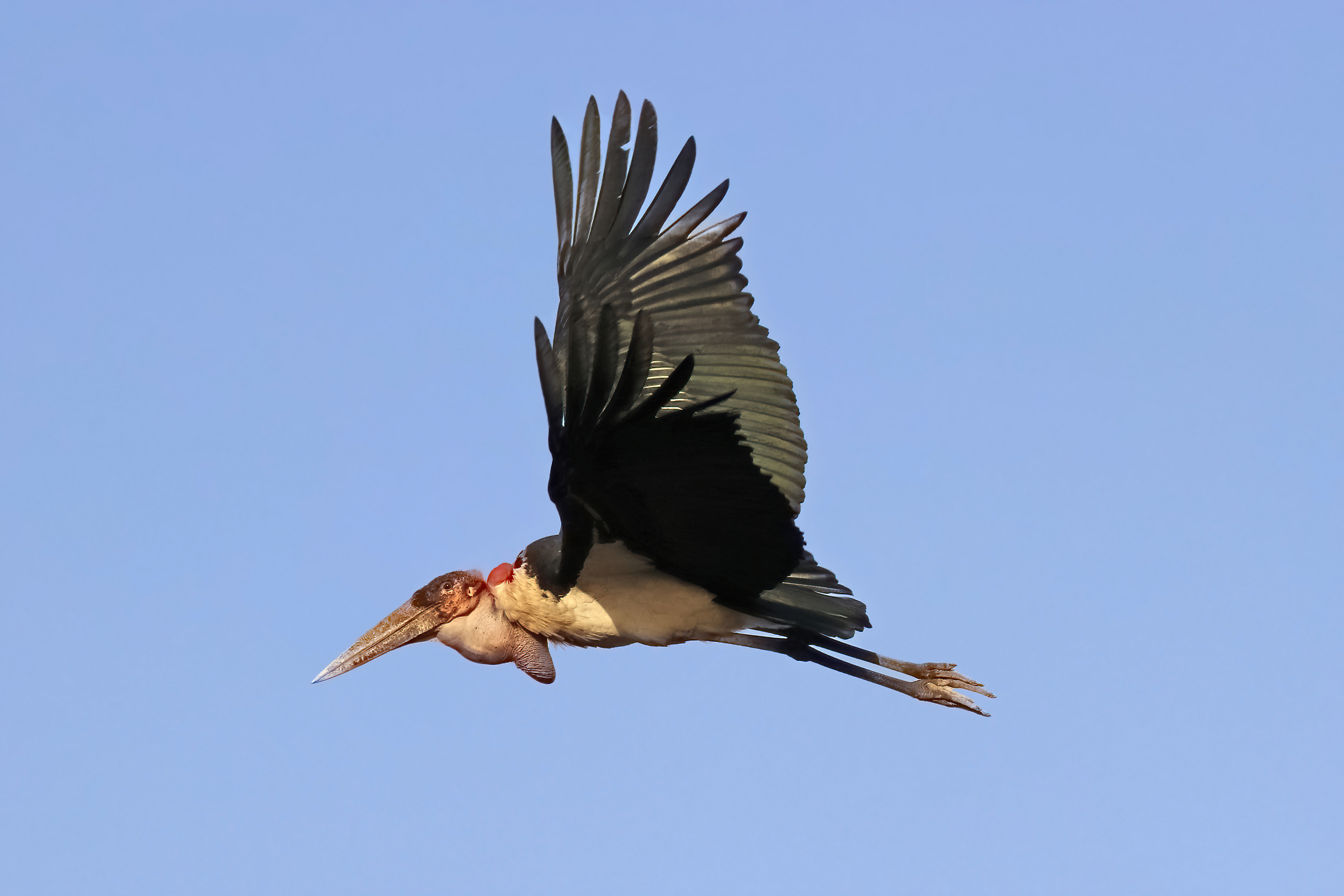
- Ethiopia

Conservation status
- Least Concern (IUCN 3.1)

Scientific classification
- Kingdom: Animalia
- Phylum: Chordata
- Class: Aves
- Order: Ciconiiformes
- Family: Ciconiidae
- Genus: Leptoptilos
- Species: L. crumenifer

Binomial name
- Leptoptilos crumenifer (Lesson, RP, 1831)
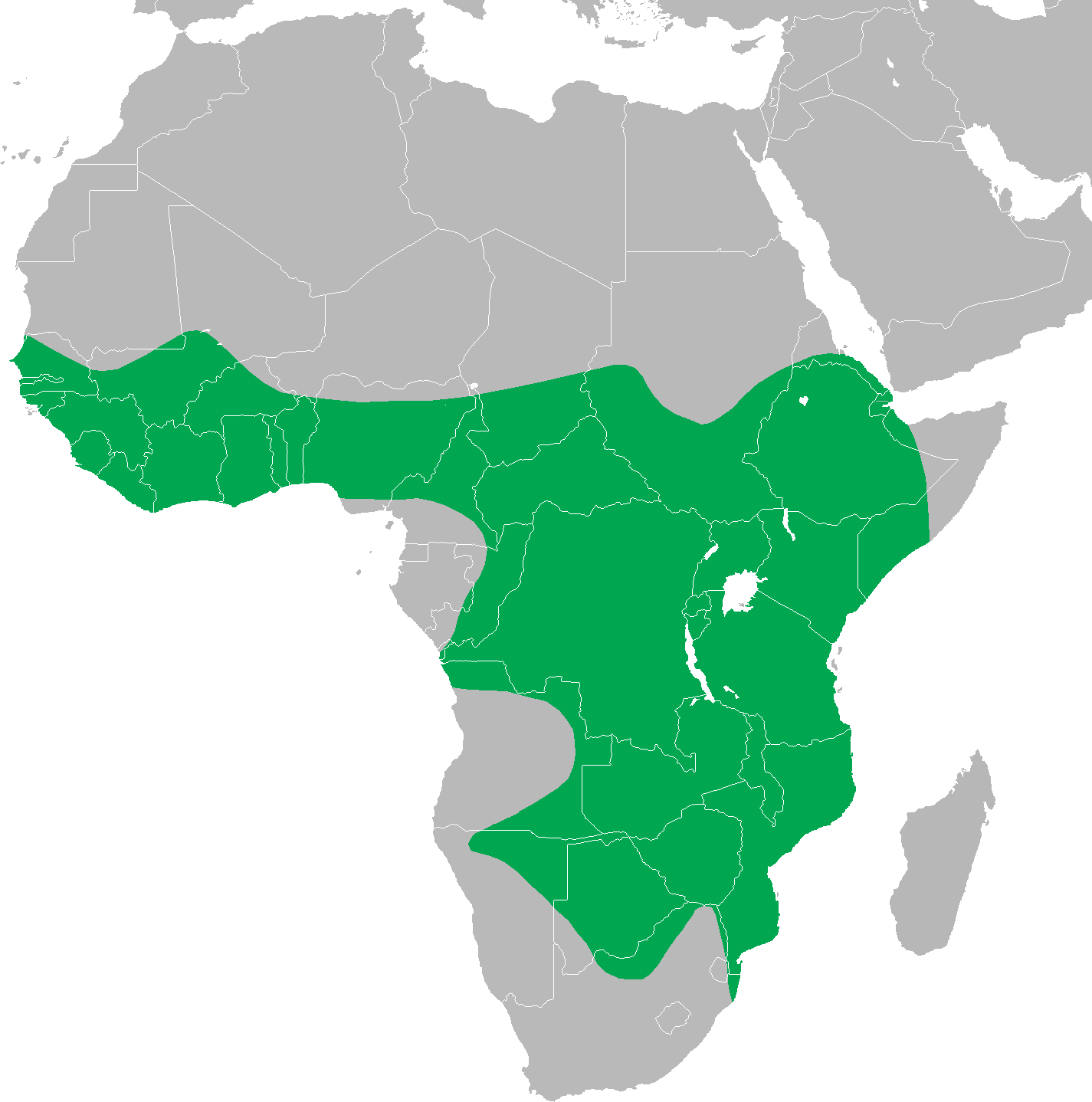
- native range

Synonyms
- Ciconia crumenifera; Leptoptilos crumeniferus

= Marabou stork =

Species of bird

The marabou stork (Leptoptilos crumenifer) is a large wading bird in the stork family Ciconiidae native to sub-Saharan Africa. It breeds in both wet and arid habitats, often near human habitation, especially landfill sites. It is sometimes called the "undertaker bird" due to its shape from behind: cloak-like wings and back, skinny white legs, and sometimes a large white mass of "hair". It has often been credited with the largest wingspan of any land bird, with an average of 2.6 metres (8.5 ft) and some recorded examples of up to 3.2 metres (10 ft).It forms part of the group of animals known as the 'Ugly Five' in the safari world.

== Taxonomy ==
The marabou stork was formally described in 1831 by the French naturalist René Lesson. He placed it in the stork genus Ciconia and coined the binomial name Ciconia crumenifera. He specified that locality as Senegal. The species epithet means "carrying a purse around the neck". The species is now placed with the lesser adjutant and the greater adjutant in the genus Leptoptilos that Lesson had introduced at the same time he described the marabou stork. The species is monotypic: no subspecies are recognised.

The common name marabou is thought to be derived from the Arabic word murābit meaning quiet or hermit-like. The species was originally described as Ciconia crumenifera. When the species was moved into the genus Leptoptilos, the ending was modified to crumeniferus and this was used by many authors until it was noted that the correct masculine ending to match the genus is crumenifer.

== Description ==
The marabou stork is a massive bird: large specimens are thought to reach a height of 152 centimetres (5 feet) and a weight of 9 kg (20 lb). A wingspan of 3.7 m (12 ft) was accepted by Fisher and Peterson, who ranked the species as having the largest wing-spread of any living bird. Even higher measurements of up to 4.06 m (13.3 ft) have been reported, although no measurement over 3.20 m (10.5 ft) has been verified. It is often credited with the largest spread of any landbird, to rival the Andean condor; more typically, however, these storks measure 225–287 cm (7–9 ft) across the wings, which is about a foot less than the average Andean condor wingspan and nearly two feet less than the average of the largest albatrosses and pelicans. Typical weight is 4.5–8 kg (10–17.5 lb), unusually as low as 4 kg (9 lb), and length (from bill to tail) is 120 to 130 cm (47 to 51 in). Females are smaller than males. Bill length can range from 26.4 to 35 cm (10.5 to 14 in). Unlike most storks, the three Leptoptilos species fly with the neck retracted like a heron.

The marabou is unmistakable due to its size, bare head and neck, black back, and white underparts. It has a huge bill, a pink gular sac at its throat (crumenifer(us) means "carrier of a pouch for money"), a neck ruff, and white legs and black wings. The sexes are alike, but the young bird is browner and has a smaller bill. Full maturity is not reached for up to four years.

== Behavior and ecology ==
Like most storks, the marabou is gregarious and a colonial breeder. In the African dry season (when food is more readily available as the pools shrink), it builds a tree nest in which two or three eggs are laid. It is known to be quite ill-tempered.

It also resembles other storks in that it is not very vocal, but indulges in bill-rattling courtship displays. The throat sac is also used to make various noises at that time.

=== Breeding ===
The marabou stork breeds in Africa south of the Sahara. In East Africa, the birds interact with humans and breed in urban areas. In southern African countries, the birds breed mainly in less populated areas. The marabou stork breeds in colonies, starting during the dry season. The female lays two to three eggs in a small nest made of sticks; eggs hatch after an incubation period of 30 days. Their young reach sexual maturity at 4 years of age. Lifespan is 43 years in captivity and 25 years in wild.

=== Feeding ===
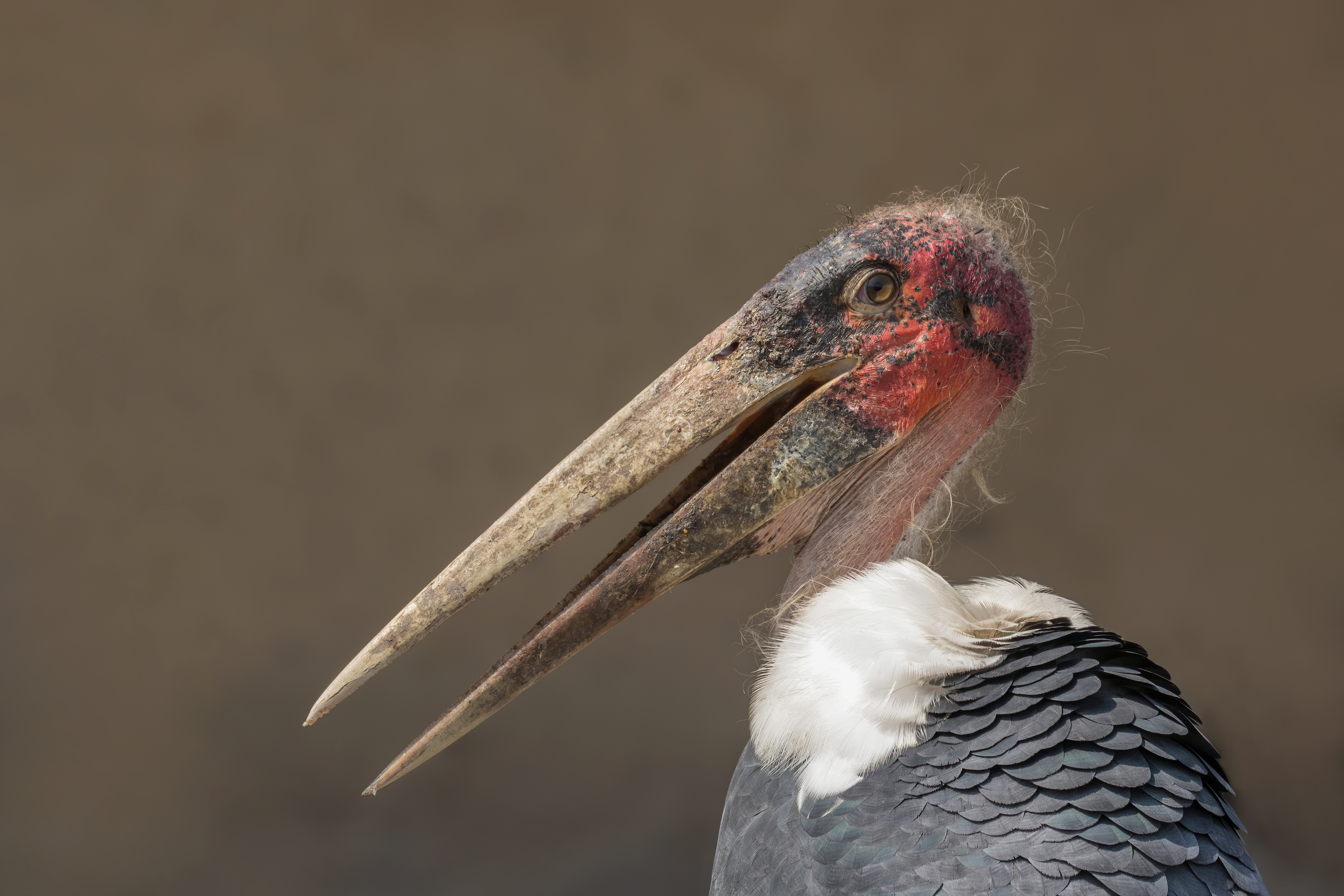
In Queen Elizabeth National Park, Uganda

The marabou stork is a frequent scavenger, and the naked head and long neck are adaptations to this livelihood, as it is with the vultures with which the stork often feeds. In both cases, a feathered head would become rapidly clotted with blood and other substances when the bird's head was inside a large corpse, and the bare head is easier to keep clean.

This large and powerful bird eats mainly carrion, scraps, and faeces but will opportunistically eat almost any animal matter it can swallow. It occasionally eats other birds including Quelea nestlings, pigeons, doves, pelican and cormorant chicks, and even flamingos. During the breeding season, adults scale back on carrion and take mostly small, live prey since nestlings need this kind of food to survive. Common prey at this time may consist of fish, frogs, insects, eggs, small mammals and reptiles such as crocodile hatchlings and eggs, lizards and snakes. Though known to eat putrid and seemingly inedible foods, these storks may sometimes wash food in water to remove soil.

When feeding on carrion, marabou frequently follow vultures, which are better equipped with hooked bills for tearing through carrion meat and may wait for the vultures to cast aside a piece, steal a piece of meat directly from the vulture or wait until the vultures are done. As with vultures, marabou storks perform an important natural function by cleaning areas via their ingestion of carrion and waste.

Increasingly, marabous have become dependent on human garbage and hundreds of the huge birds can be found around African dumps or waiting for a hand out in urban areas. Marabous eating human garbage have been seen to devour virtually anything that they can swallow, including shoes and pieces of metal. Marabous conditioned to eating from human sources have been known to lash out when refused food.

=== Threats ===
Fully grown marabou storks have few natural enemies, and have high annual survival rate, though lions have reportedly preyed on some individuals in ambush. A number of endoparasites have been identified in wild marabous including Cheilospirura, Echinura and Acuaria nematodes, Amoebotaenia sphenoides (Cestoda) and Dicrocoelium hospes (Trematoda).

== Human uses ==
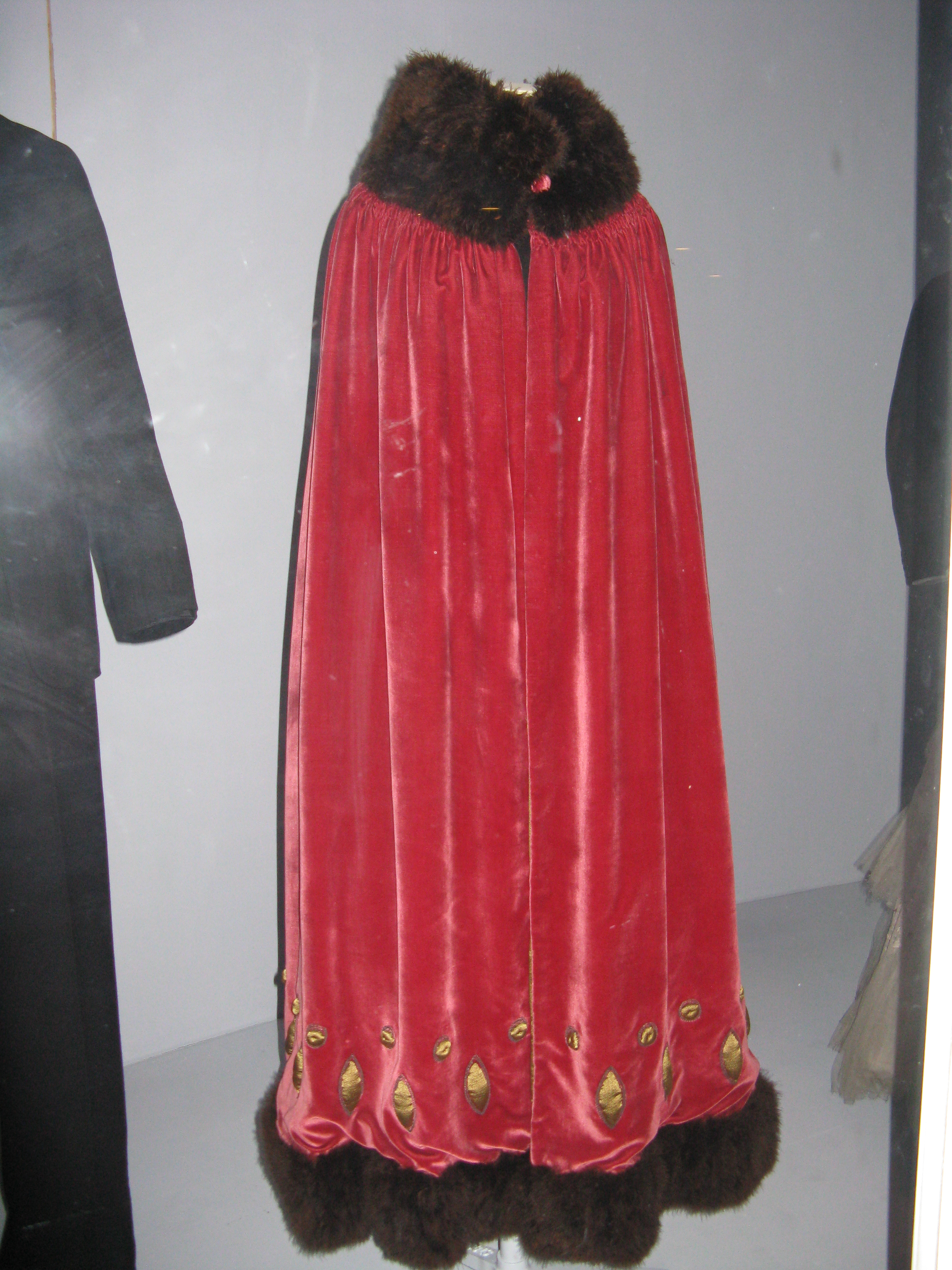
1920 cloak, hem trimmed with marabou feathers

Marabou down is frequently used in the trimming of various items of clothing and hats, as well as fishing lures. Turkey down and similar feathers have been used as a substitute for making 'marabou' trimming.

== Gallery ==
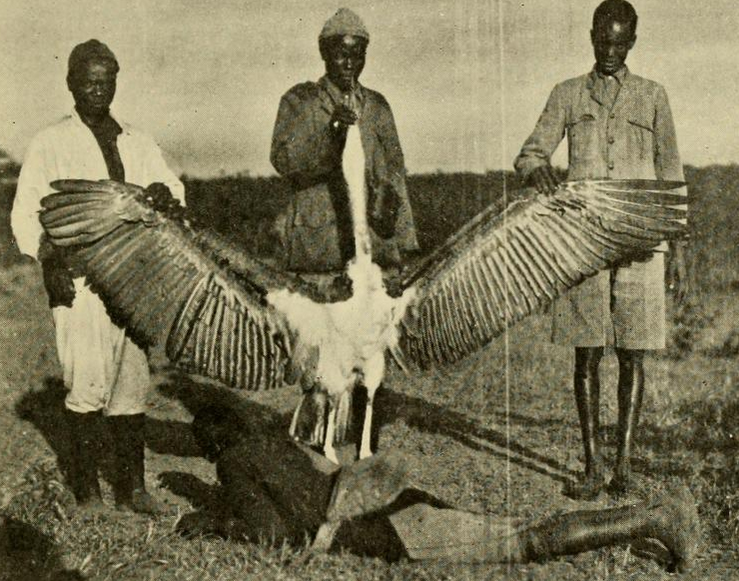
Large marabou stork, British East Africa

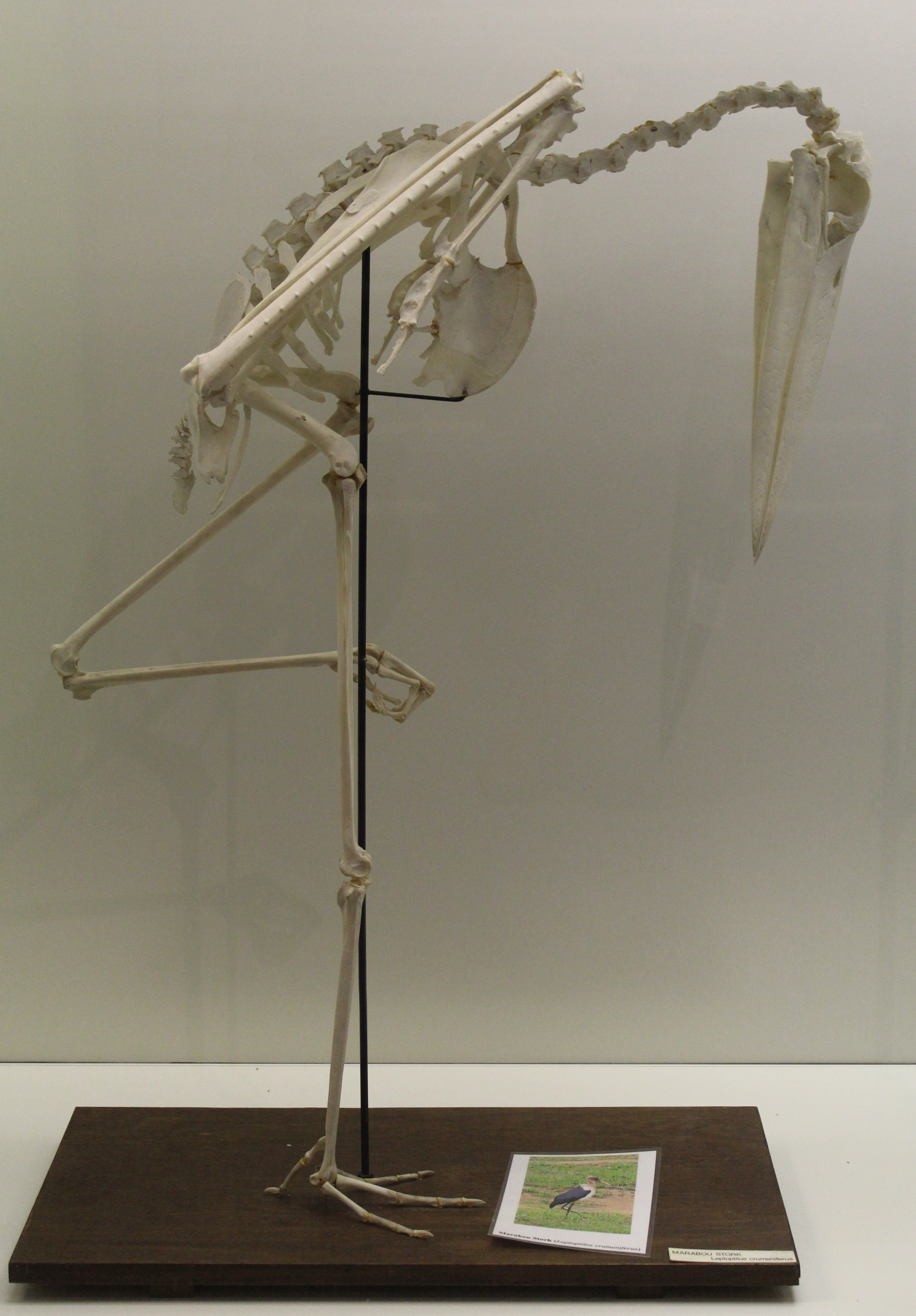
Skeleton of a marabou stork

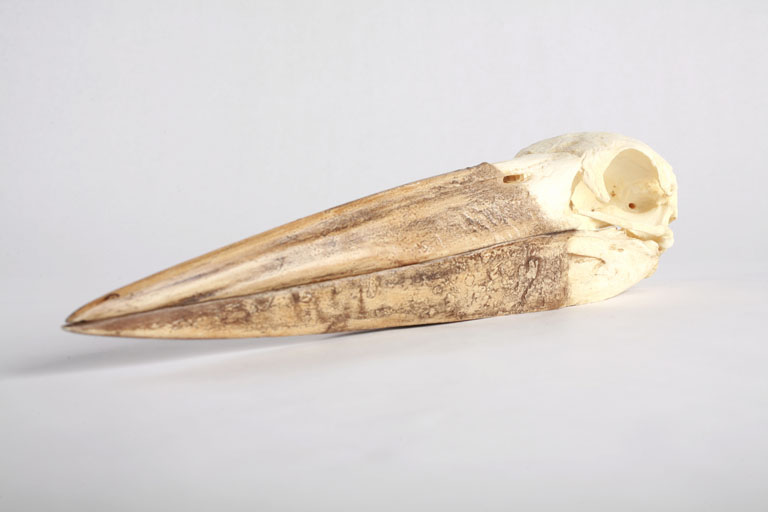
Skull cast from an individual displays its long beak

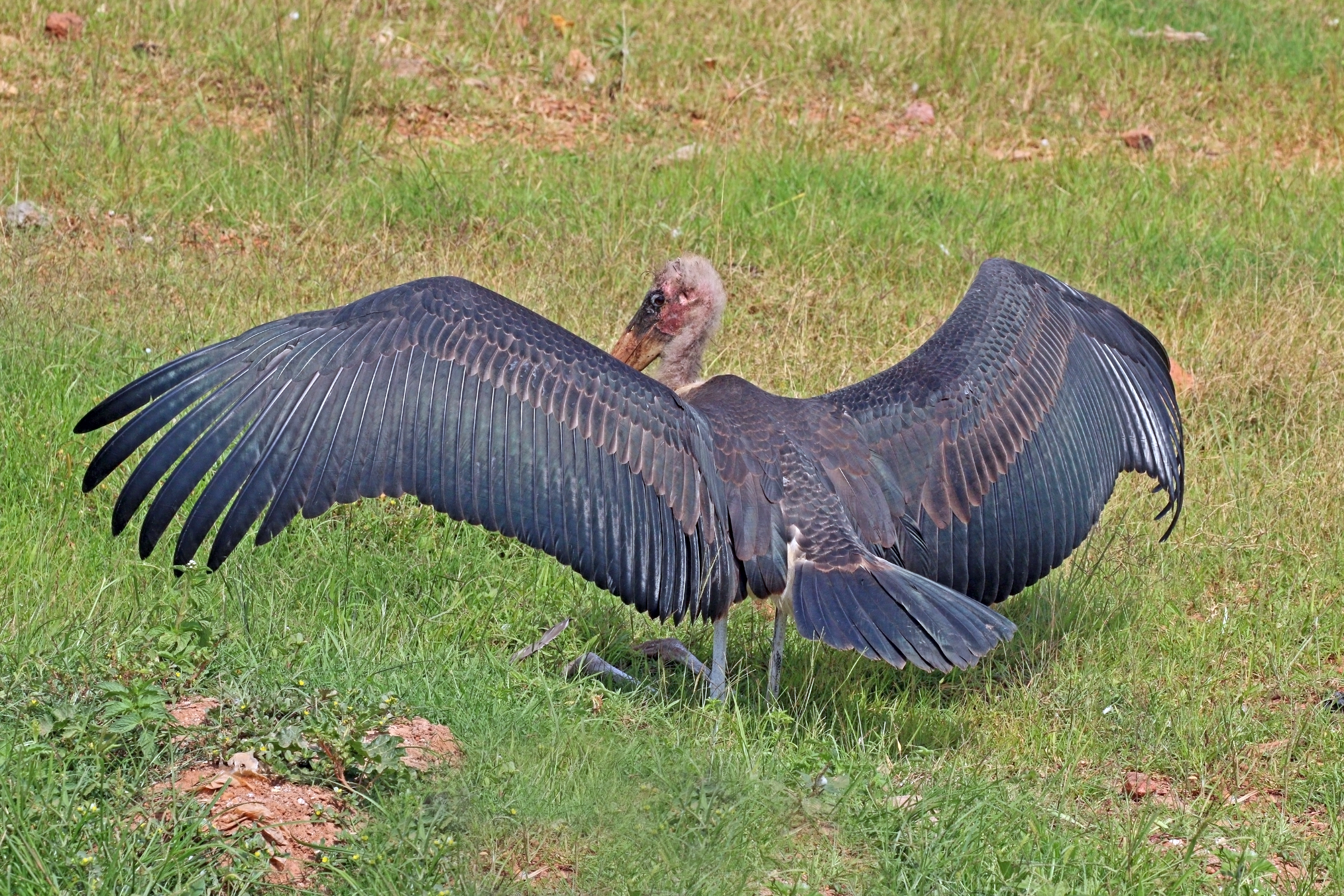
Spreading wings, Uganda

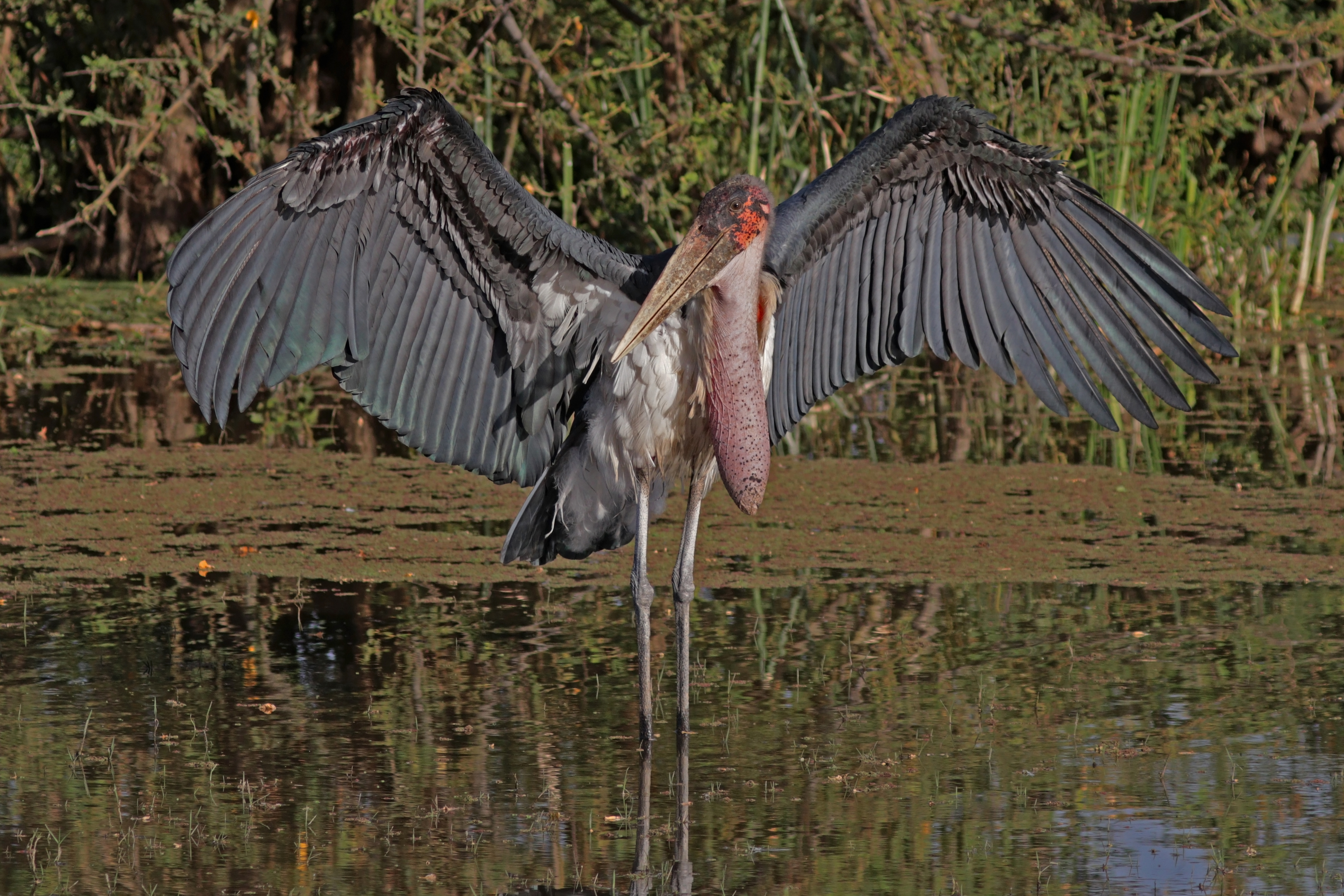
Spreading wings, Ethiopia

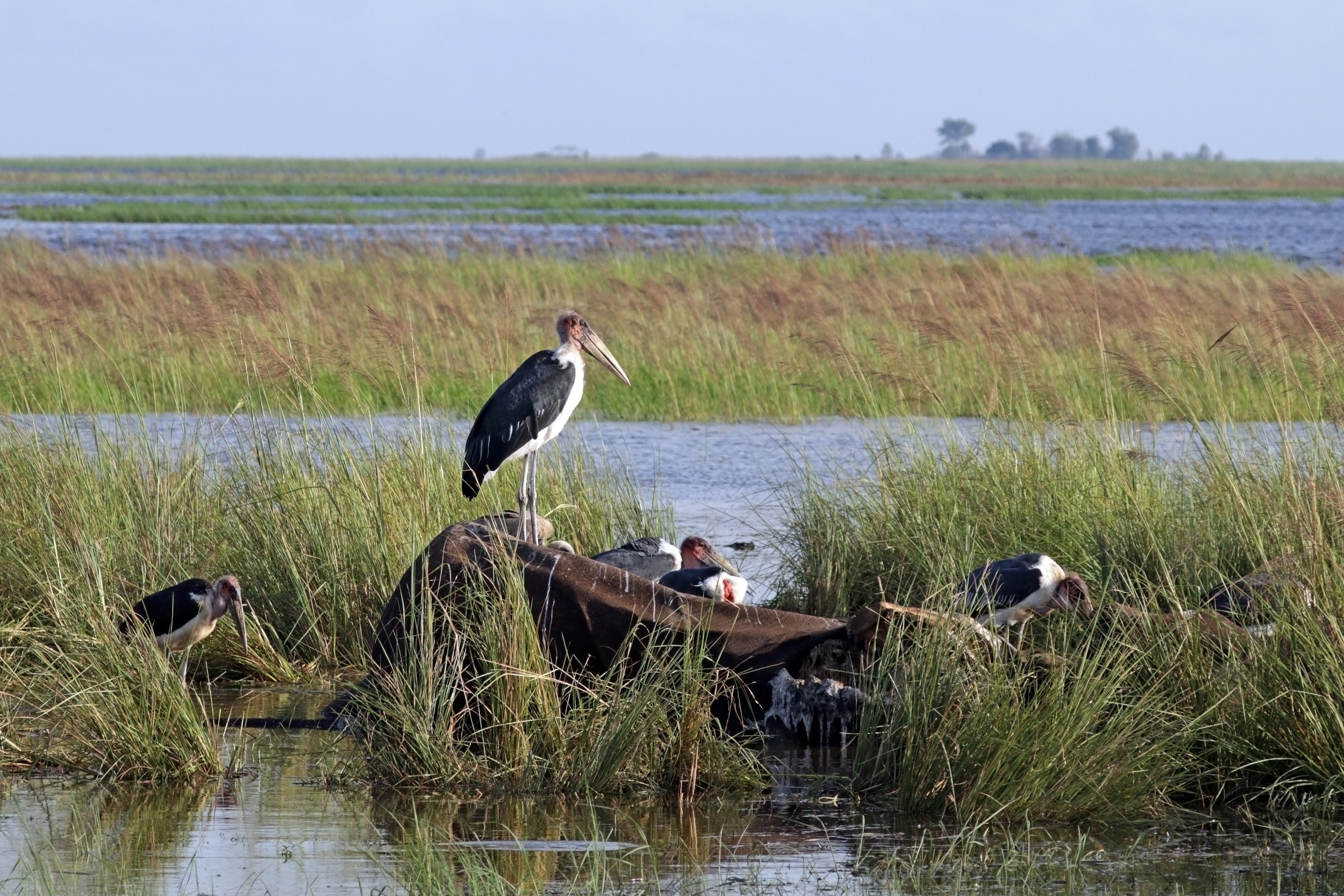
Feeding on elephant carcass

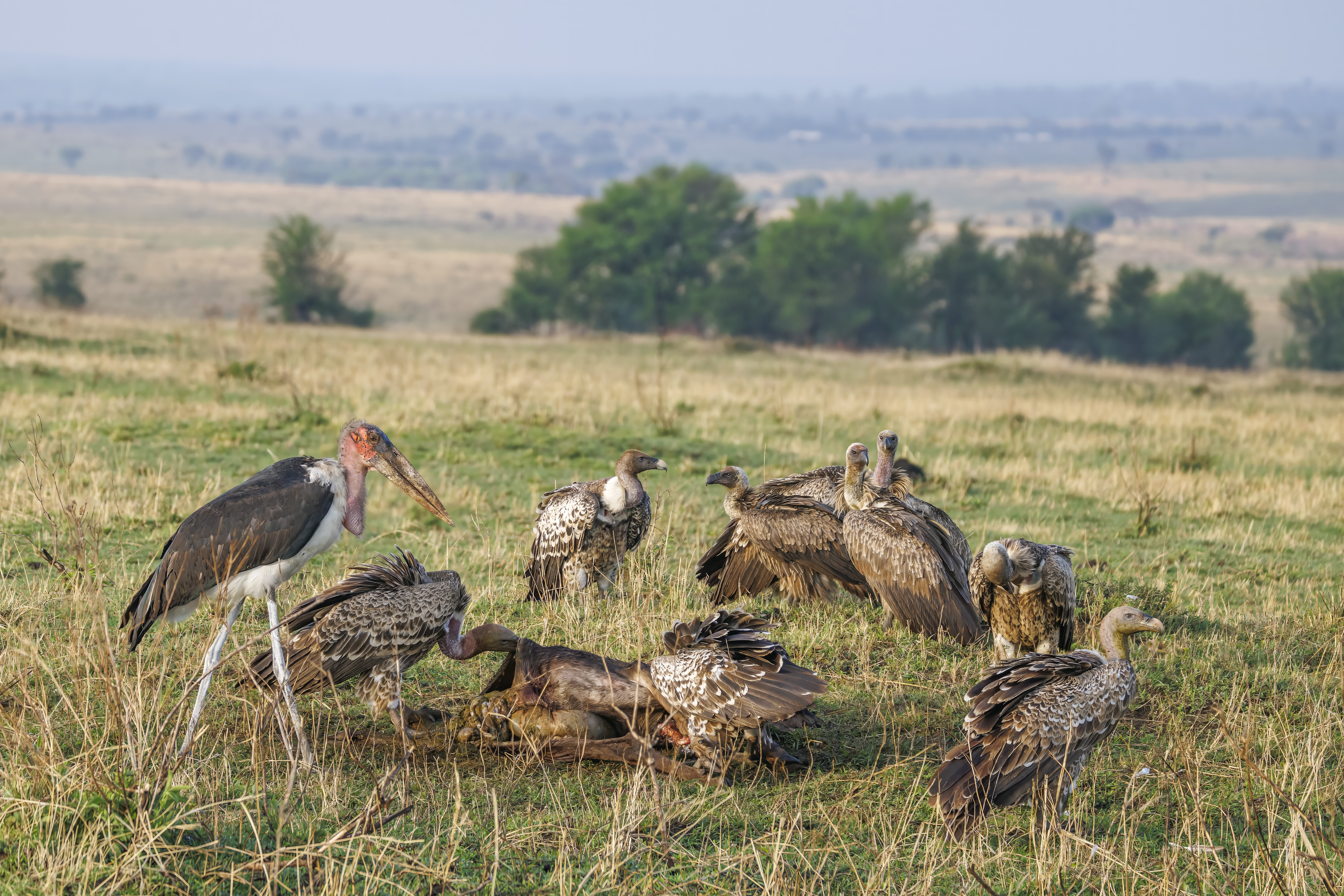
Feeding on wildebeest carcass with white-backed vultures (Gyps africanus) and Rüppell's vultures (G. rueppelli)

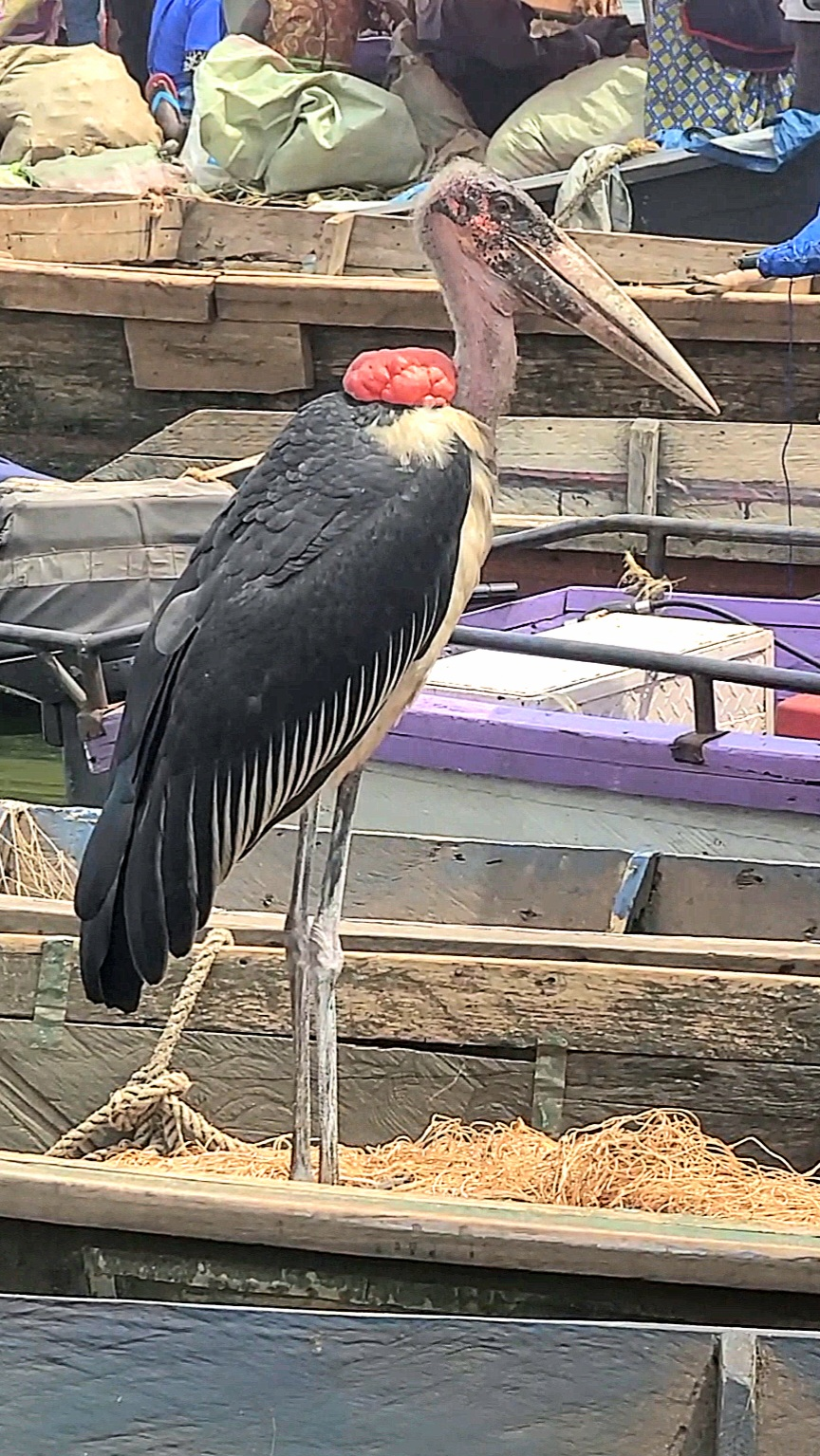
Looting fishermen's boats on Lake Victoria for fish scraps at Ggaba in Uganda
