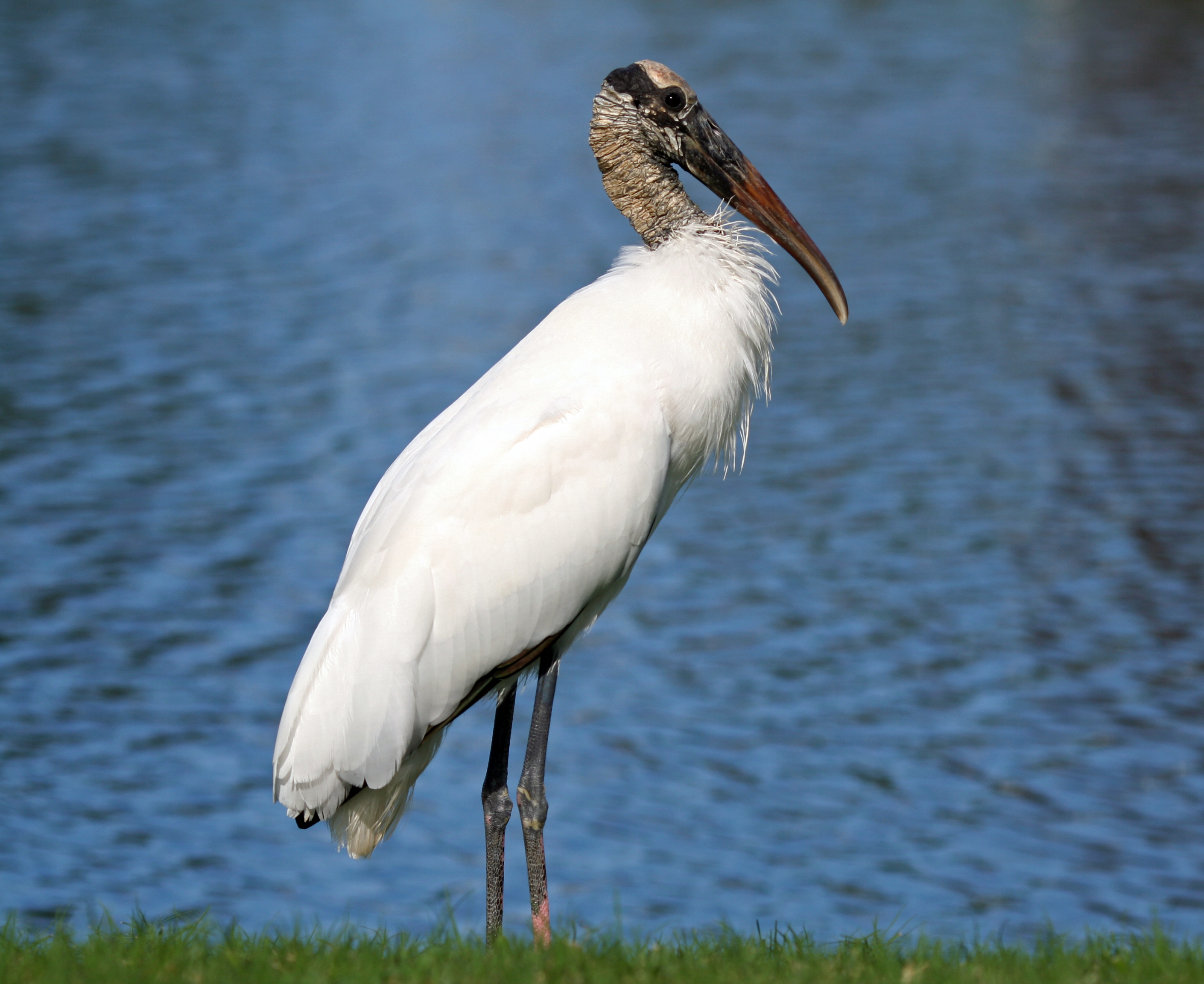
- Pond, Tampa Bay, Florida

Conservation status
- Least Concern (IUCN 3.1)

Scientific classification
- Kingdom: Animalia
- Phylum: Chordata
- Class: Aves
- Order: Ciconiiformes
- Family: Ciconiidae
- Genus: Mycteria
- Species: M. americana

Binomial name
- Mycteria americana Linnaeus, 1758
- Geographical distribution of the wood stork Breeding Year-round Nonbreeding

Synonyms
- Tantalus loculator Linnaeus, 1758

Audio
- Chick vocalizations

= Wood stork =

Wading bird found in the Americas

The wood stork (Mycteria americana) is a large wading bird in the family Ciconiidae (storks). Originally described in 1758 by Carl Linnaeus, this stork is native to the subtropics and tropics of the Americas, where it persists in habitats with fluctuating water levels. It is the only stork species that breeds in North America. The head and neck are bare of feathers, and dark grey in colour. The plumage is mostly white, with the exception of the tail and some of the wing feathers, which are black with a greenish-purplish sheen.

Globally, the wood stork is considered to be of least concern by the International Union for Conservation of Nature. In the United States, the wood stork was previously classified as endangered due to loss of suitable feeding habitat in the Florida Everglades, its historical population stronghold in the country. The species has been subsequently downlisted to threatened after northward range expansion and increased population size.

== Taxonomy and etymology ==
The wood stork was first formally given its binomial name Mycteria americana by Linnaeus in 1758. Linnaeus originally named two separate species, M. americana and Tantalus loculator, based on different and slightly erroneous accounts, in his book Systema Naturae. It was later identified that these binomials referred to the same species, making M. americana and T. loculator synonymous. M. americana takes priority as it occurs before T. loculator.

The accepted generic name Mycteria derives from the Greek μυκτήρ : myktēr, meaning snout or trunk, and the species name americana references the distribution of this stork.

Likely because of its decurved bill, the wood stork has formerly been called the "wood ibis", although it is not an ibis. It also has been given the name of the "American wood stork", because it is found in the Americas. Its regional names include "flinthead", "stonehead", "ironhead", "gourdhead", and "preacher".

The wood stork is classified within the tribe Mycteriini (which encompasses all species of genera Anastomus and Mycteria) based on morphology and behaviour.

== Description ==
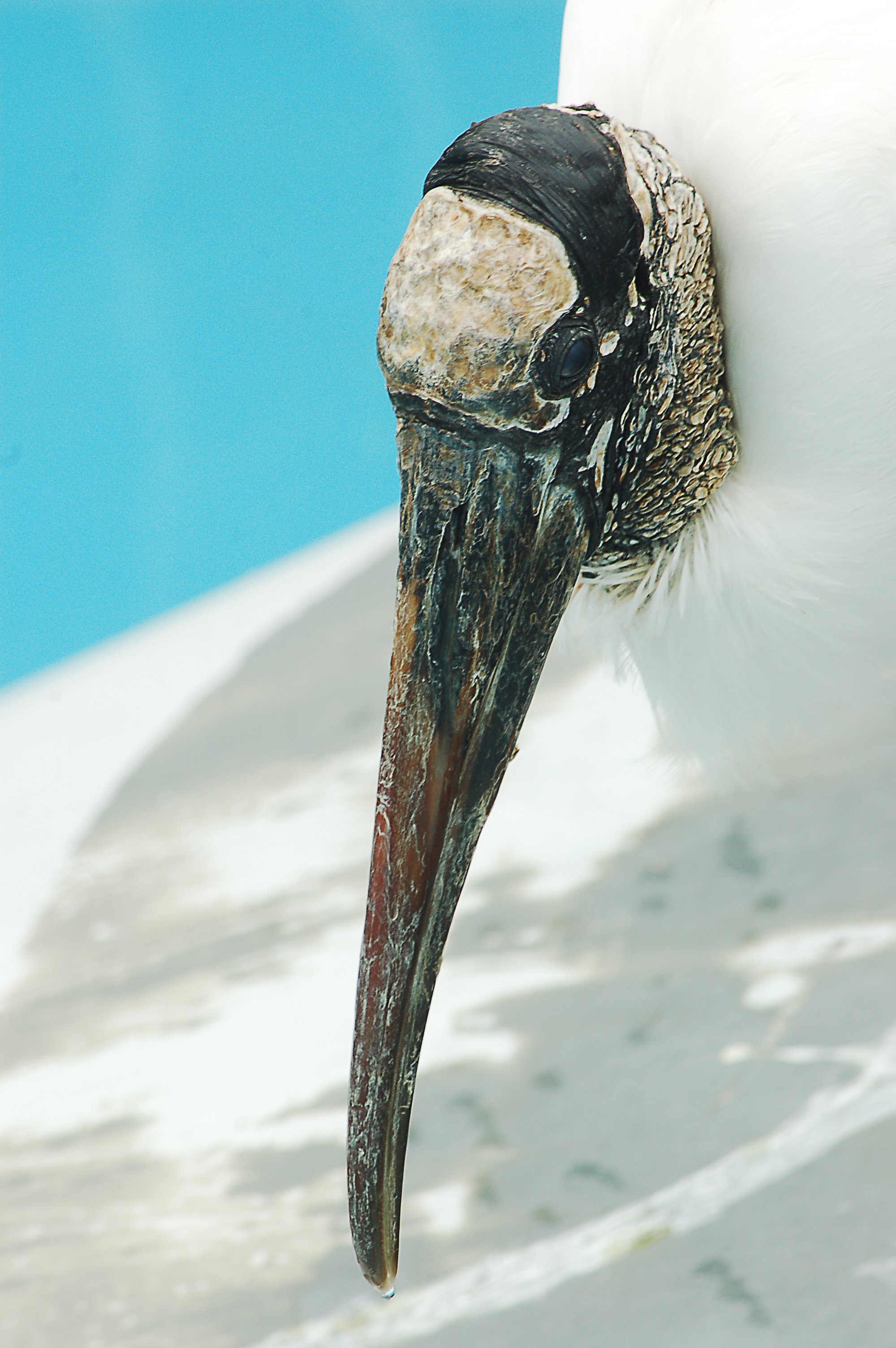
The wood stork's head much resembles that of an ibis.

The adult wood stork is a large bird which stands 83–115 cm (33–45 in) tall with a wingspan of 140–180 cm (55–71 in). The male typically weighs 2.5–3.3 kg (5.5–7.3 lb), with a mean weight of 2.7 kg (6.0 lb); the female weighs 2.0–2.8 kg (4.4–6.2 lb), with a mean weight of 2.42 kg (5.3 lb). Another estimate puts the mean weight at 2.64 kg (5.8 lb). The head and neck of the adult are bare, and the scaly skin is a dark grey. The black downward-curved bill is long and very wide at the base. The plumage is mostly white, with the primaries, secondaries, and tail being black and having a greenish and purplish iridescence. The legs and feet are dark, and the pink/beige-coloured toes are pink during the breeding season. The sexes are similar.

Newly hatched chicks have a sparse coat of grey down (protoptiles) that is replaced by a dense, wooly, and white down (mesoptiles) in about 10 days. Chicks grow fast, being about half the height of adults in 3-4 weeks. By 6-7 weeks, the plumage on the head and neck turns smokey grey. When fledged, they resemble the adult, differing only in that they have a feathered head and a yellow bill.

== Distribution and habitat ==
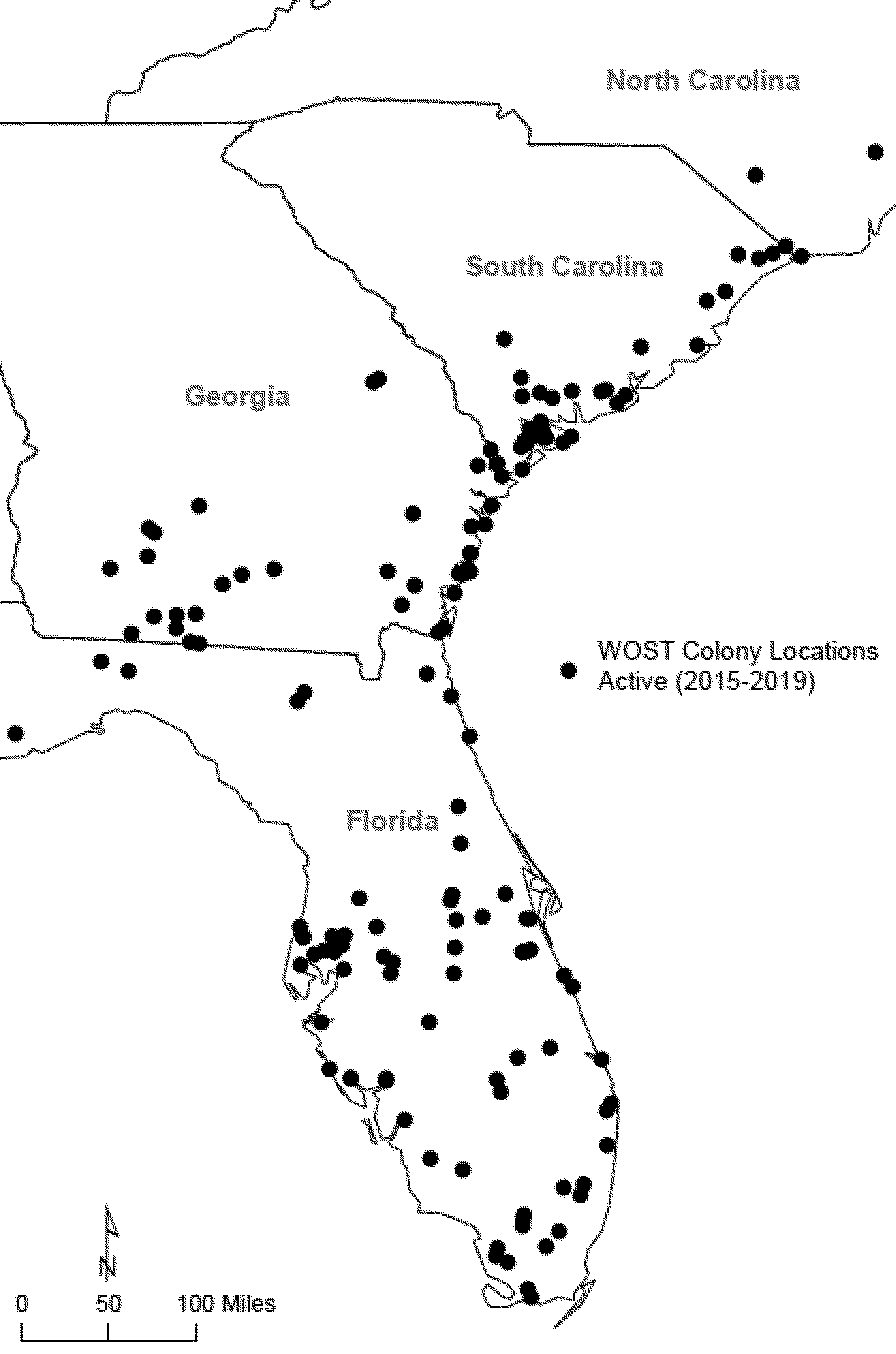
Active wood stork colonies in the United States from 2015 to 2019 (United States Fish and Wildlife Service, 2023)

The current range of the wood stork includes the Southeastern United States, Mexico, Central America, Cuba, and South America.

Within the United States, small breeding populations exist in Florida, Georgia, and North and South Carolina. Birds after breeding in the United States can be found as far west as Alabama and Mississippi.

In Mexico, nonbreeding birds can be found along both the Pacific and Atlantic Coasts, while breeding colonies are restricted to the Pacific Coast. Most descriptions of wood stork breeding colonies in western Mexico are over 35 years old, but recent sources have confirmed active nesting colonies in the southwestern states of Oaxaca and Colima.

Cuba contains the only two known breeding locations for wood storks in the Caribbean. Both colonies exist in important wetlands - Zapata Swamp and the Sabana-Camaguey Archipelago. Outside of Cuba, sightings of wood storks are rare in the Caribbean, as the birds were extirpated from Hispaniola and are vagrants on other Caribbean islands.

In South America, the wood stork is found south to northern Argentina. Most breeding colonies in Brazil are concentrated in the Pantanal wetland and the northern coastal region. Birds that breed in west-central Brazil often disperse to southern Brazil and northern Argentina after breeding.

The wood stork is able to adapt to a variety of tropical and subtropical wetland habitats having fluctuating water levels, which initiate breeding. It nests in trees that are over water or surrounded by water. In freshwater habitats, it primarily nests in forests dominated by trees of the genus Taxodium (in the U.S.), while in estuaries, it generally nests on trees in the mangrove forests. To feed, the wood stork uses freshwater marshes in habitats with an abundance of Taxodium trees, while in areas with mangrove forests, it uses brackish water. Areas with more lakes attract feeding on lake, stream, and river edges.

== Behaviour and ecology ==
=== Breeding ===
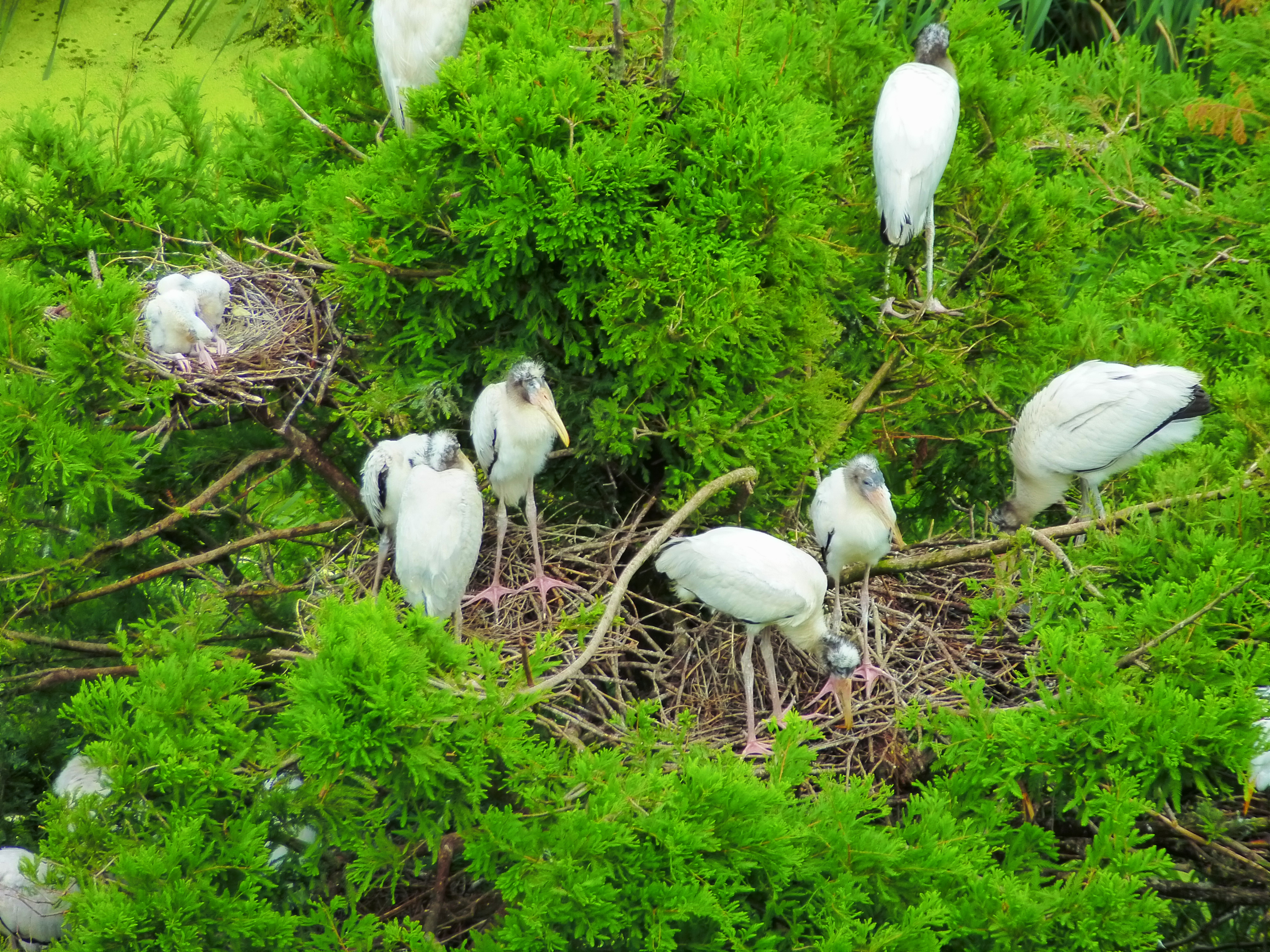
Nesting colony in Harris Neck Wildlife Refuge, Georgia, United States

A resident breeder in lowland wetlands, the wood stork builds large, one-metre-diameter (3.3-foot) nests in trees. In freshwater habitats, it prefers to nest in trees larger in diameter. It nests colonially, with up to 25 nests in one tree. The height of these nests is variable, with some nests located in shorter mangrove trees being at heights of about 2.5 metres (8.2 ft), compared to a height of about 6.5 metres (21 ft) for taller mangrove trees. For Taxodium trees, it generally nests near the top branches, frequently between 18 and 24 metres (59 and 79 ft) above the ground. On the tree itself, forks of large limbs or places where multiple branches cross are usually chosen.

The nest is built by the male from sticks and green twigs collected from the colony and the surrounding area. The greenery usually starts to be added before the eggs are laid, but after the main structure of twigs is completed. The frequency at which it is added decreases after the eggs hatch. This greenery functions to help insulate the nest. When complete, the nest is about 1 metre (3.3 ft) in diameter, with a central green area having an average diameter around 28 centimetres (11 in). The thickness of the edge of the nest usually measures from 12 to 20 centimetres (4.7 to 7.9 in).

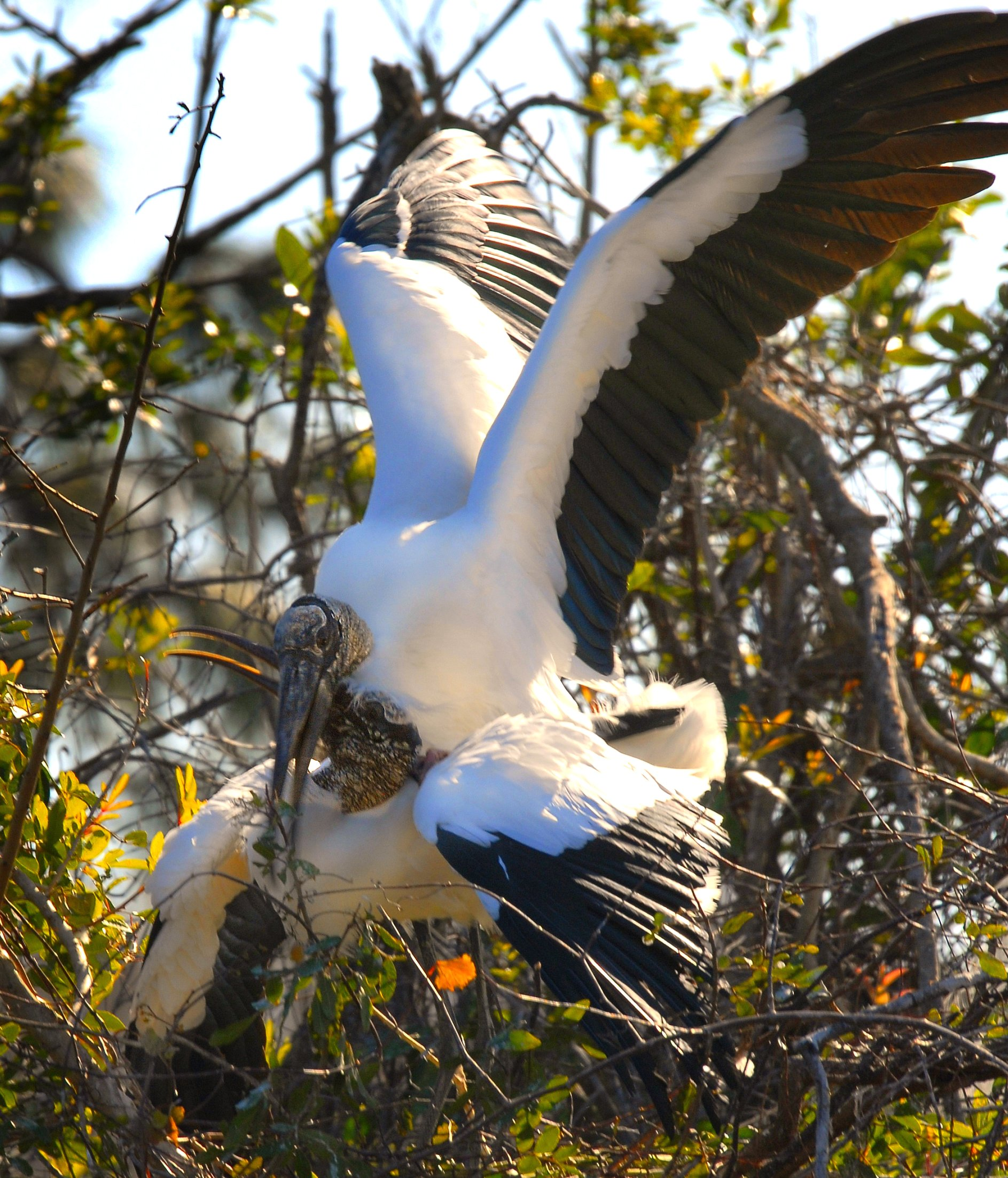
Wood storks copulating

Wood storks without a nest occasionally try to take over others' nests. Such nest take-overs are performed by more than one bird. The young and eggs are thrown out of the nest within about 15 minutes. If only one stork is attending the nest when it is forced out, then it usually waits for its mate to try to take the nest back over.

Breeding is initiated by a drop in the water level combined with an increased density of fish (with the former likely triggering the latter). This is because a decrease in the water level and an increased density of fish allows for an adequate amount of food for the nestlings. This can occur between November and August; after it starts, breeding takes about 4 months to complete.

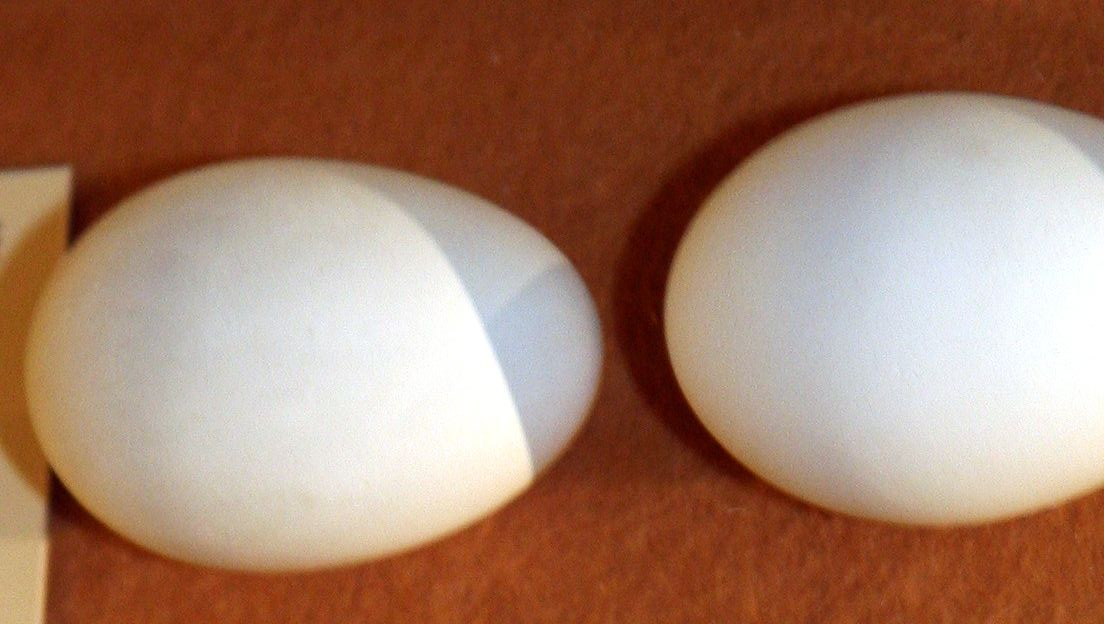
Eggs of the wood stork

This bird lays one clutch of three to five cream-coloured eggs that are about 68 by 46 millimetres (2.7 by 1.8 in) in size. These eggs are usually laid one to two days apart and incubated for 27 to 32 days by both sexes. This incubation period starts when the first egg is laid. During the first week of incubation, the parents do not go far from the colony, with the exception of the short trips to forage, drink, and collect nesting material carried out by the nonincubating bird. After the first week, the nonincubating bird spends less time in the colony, although the eggs are never left unattended. After a few hours of incubation, this bird sometimes takes a break to stretch, preen itself, rearrange nest material, or turn the eggs. The eggs hatch in the order in which they were laid, with an interval of a few days between when each egg hatches.

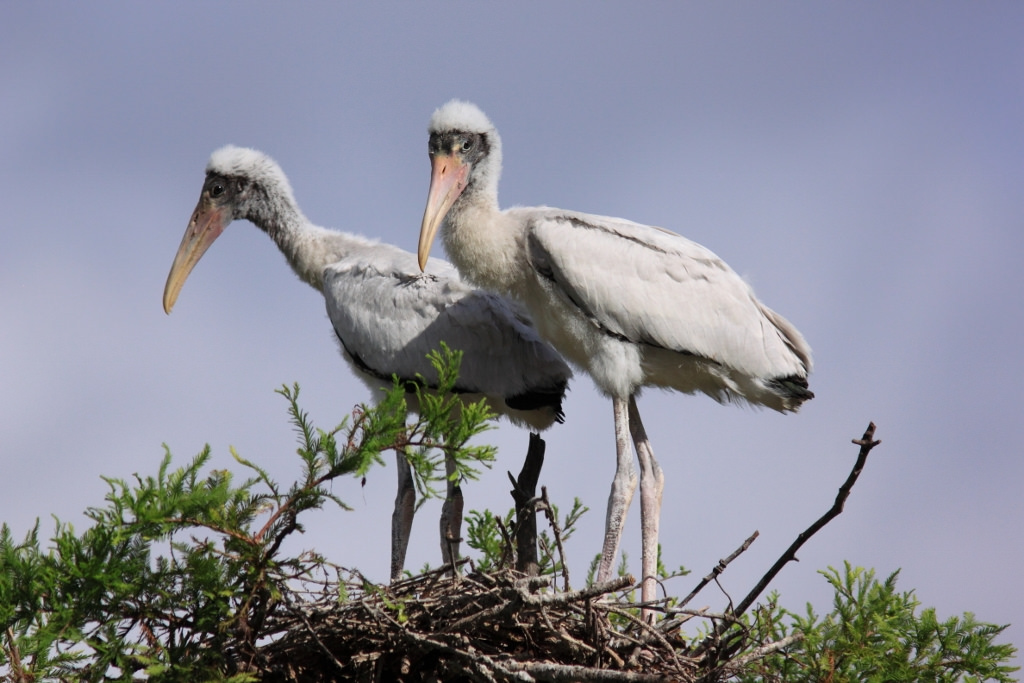
Two wood stork chicks at their nest

The chicks hatch altricial, unable to move, and weigh an average of 62 grams (2.2 oz). They are brooded for the first week after hatching, and after that when it is raining and at night. The chicks are not left alone until at least 3 weeks of age, with one parent foraging while the other guards the nest and chicks. When the chicks are at least 3 weeks old, they are large enough to stay and protect the nest. This coincides with the chicks getting more aggressive when presented with foreign objects or organisms. They fledge 60 to 65 days after hatching, and reach sexual maturity at 4 years of age, although they usually do not successfully fledge chicks until their fifth year.

The hatching success, the percentage of birds that had at least one egg that hatched in a year, of the wood stork averages around 62%, but ranges from about 26 to 89% hatching success. The period when chicks are most vulnerable to death is from hatching to when they are 2 weeks old. Overall, about 31% of nests produce at least one fledged bird. Raccoons and caracaras, especially crested caracaras, are prominent predators of eggs and chicks. Other causes of nesting failure is the falling of nests, thus breaking the eggs inside. This can be caused by many events, the most prominent being poor nest construction and fights between adults.

=== Diet and feeding ===
During the dry season, the wood stork eats mostly fish, supplemented by insects. During the wet season, though, fish make up about half the diet, crabs make up about 30%, and insects and frogs make up the rest. The wood stork eats larger fish more often than smaller fish, even in some cases where the latter is more abundant. An adult wood stork needs an estimated 520 grams (1.15 lb) per day to sustain itself. For a whole family, about 200 kilograms (440 lb) are needed per breeding season.

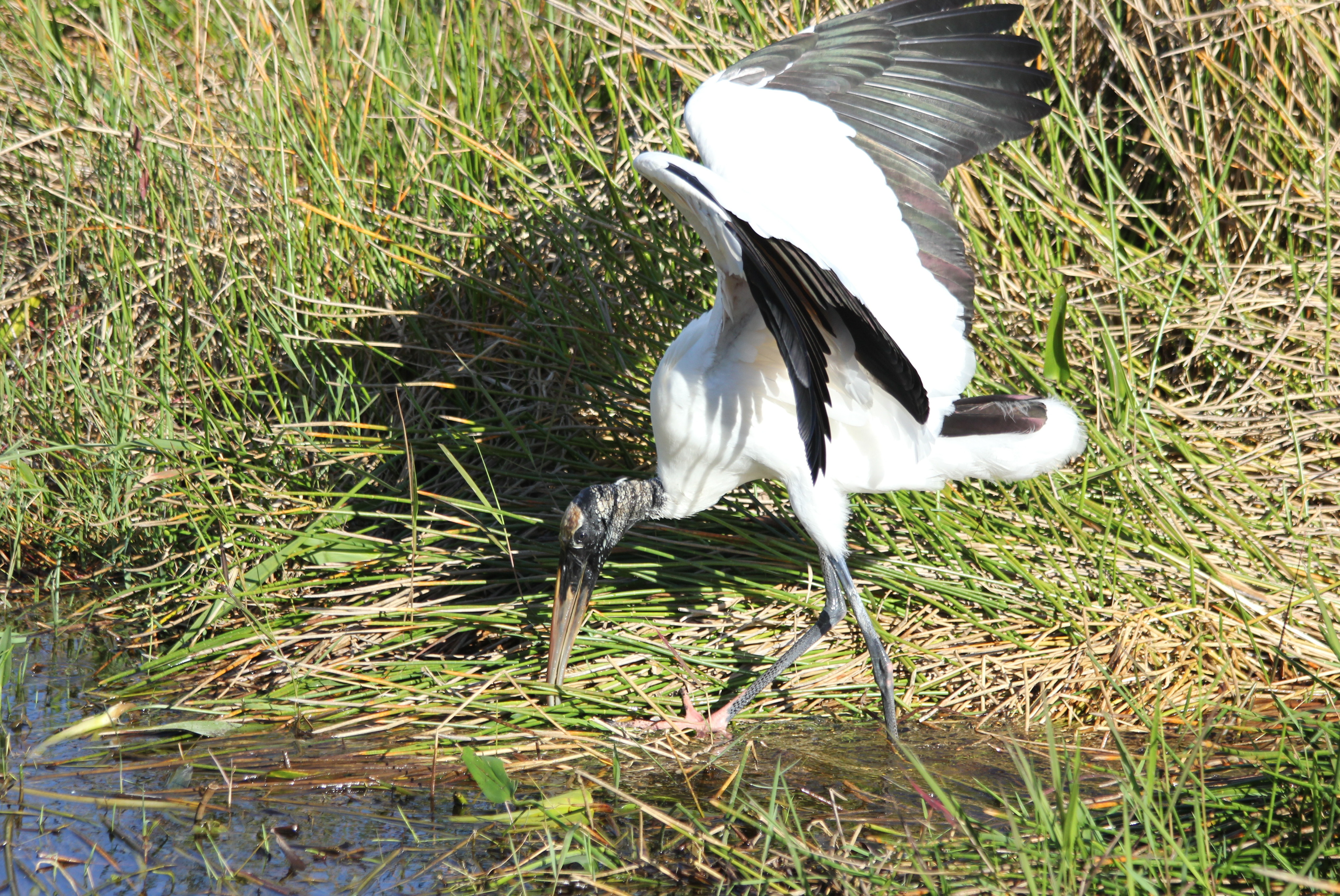
A wood stork foraging

The wood stork usually forages in flocks when not breeding, and alone and in small groups when it is breeding. In the dry season, the stork generally forages by slowly walking forward with its bill submerged in water while groping for food. During the wet season, this method is used about 40% of the time. During this period, foot stirring, where the stork walks very slowly with its bill in the water while pumping its foot up and down before every step, is used about 35% of the time. Neither of these hunting methods is visual.

Because of its nonvisual foraging methods, the wood stork requires shallow water and a high density of fish to forage successfully. The water in which it forages during the dry season averages about 17 centimetres (6.7 in) in depth, while during the wet season, the water usually is about 10 centimetres (3.9 in) deep. In the dry season, this stork prefers to forage in waters with no emergent vegetation, whereas in the wet season, it prefers areas with vegetation emerging between 10 and 20 centimetres (3.9 and 7.9 in) above the surface on average. This bird can travel over 80 kilometres (50 mi) to reach foraging sites, lending it access to a wide variety of habitats.

Both parents feed the chicks by regurgitating food onto the nest floor. The chicks are mainly fed fish that are between 2 and 25 centimetres (0.79 and 9.84 in) in length, with the size of the fish typically increasing as the chicks get older. The amount of food that the chicks get changes over time, with more being fed daily from hatching to about 22 days, when food intake levels off. This continues until about 45 days, when food consumption starts to decrease. Overall, a chick eats about 16.5 kilograms (36 lb) before it fledges.

=== Predators and parasites ===
Raccoons are predators of wood stork chicks, especially during dry periods, when the water beneath nesting trees dries up. Where it occurs, the crested caracara is a significant predator of eggs. Yellow-headed caracaras, great black-hawks, Harris' hawks, and black vultures also prey on both eggs and chicks.

In the United States, Haemoproteus crumenium, a blood protozoan, can be found in subadult and adult wood storks. Other species of Haemoproteus also infect wood storks in Costa Rica, in addition to Syncuaria mycteriae, a nematode found in the gizzard of the wood stork.

In Florida, wood storks may be eaten by some growth stage of invasive snakes such as Burmese pythons, reticulated pythons, Central African rock pythons, Southern African rock pythons, boa constrictors, yellow anacondas, Bolivian anacondas, dark-spotted anacondas, and green anacondas.

=== Flight ===
When flying, this bird uses two different techniques. When it is not sufficiently warm and clear, such as in the late afternoon or on cloudy days, this stork alternates between flapping its wings and gliding for short periods. When weather is warm and clear, this bird glides after it gains an altitude of at least 610 metres (2,000 ft) through continuously flapping its wings. It can then glide for distances ranging from 16 to 24 kilometres (9.9 to 14.9 mi). It does not have to flap its wings during this time because the thermals are strong enough to support its weight. Because of the energy that is conserved by soaring, this stork usually uses this method to fly to more distant areas. It flies with its neck outstretched and its legs and feet trailing behind it.

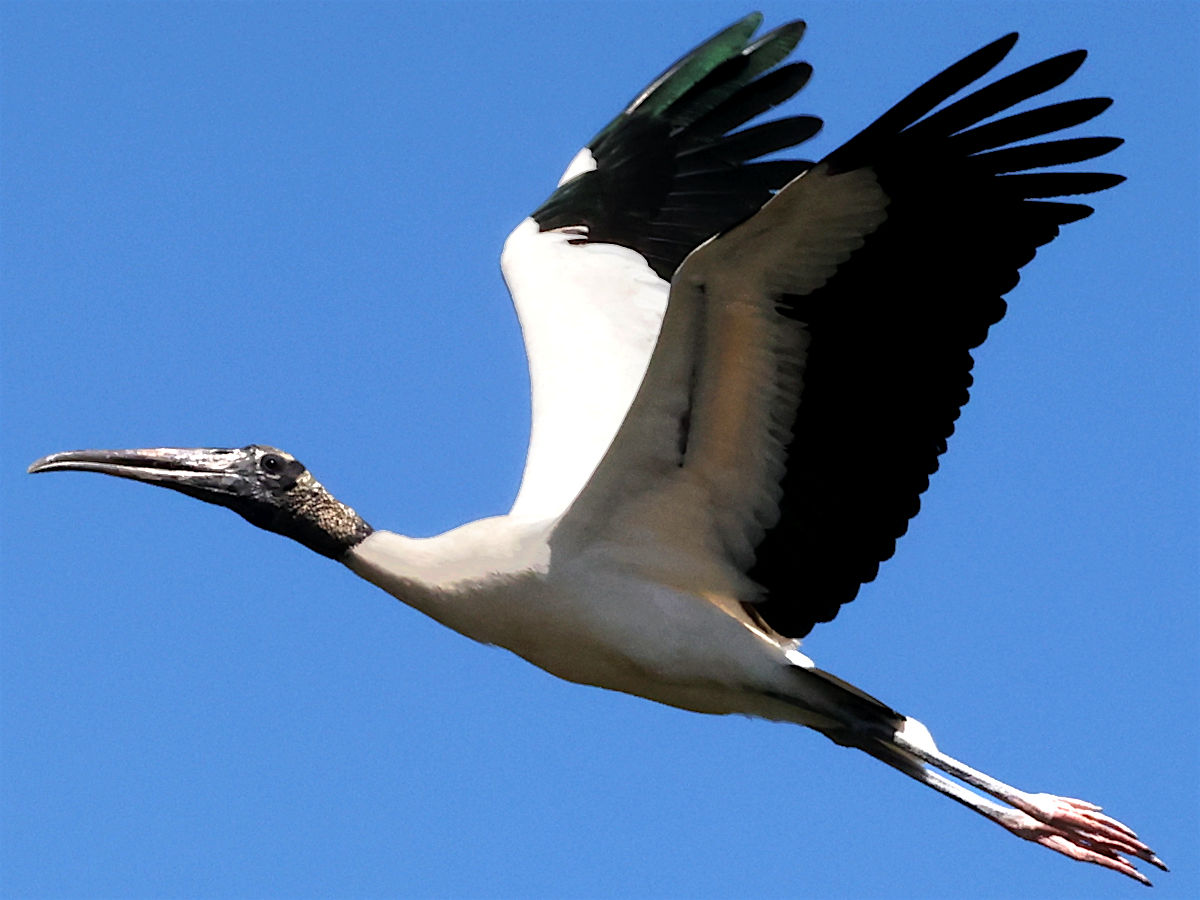
Flapping

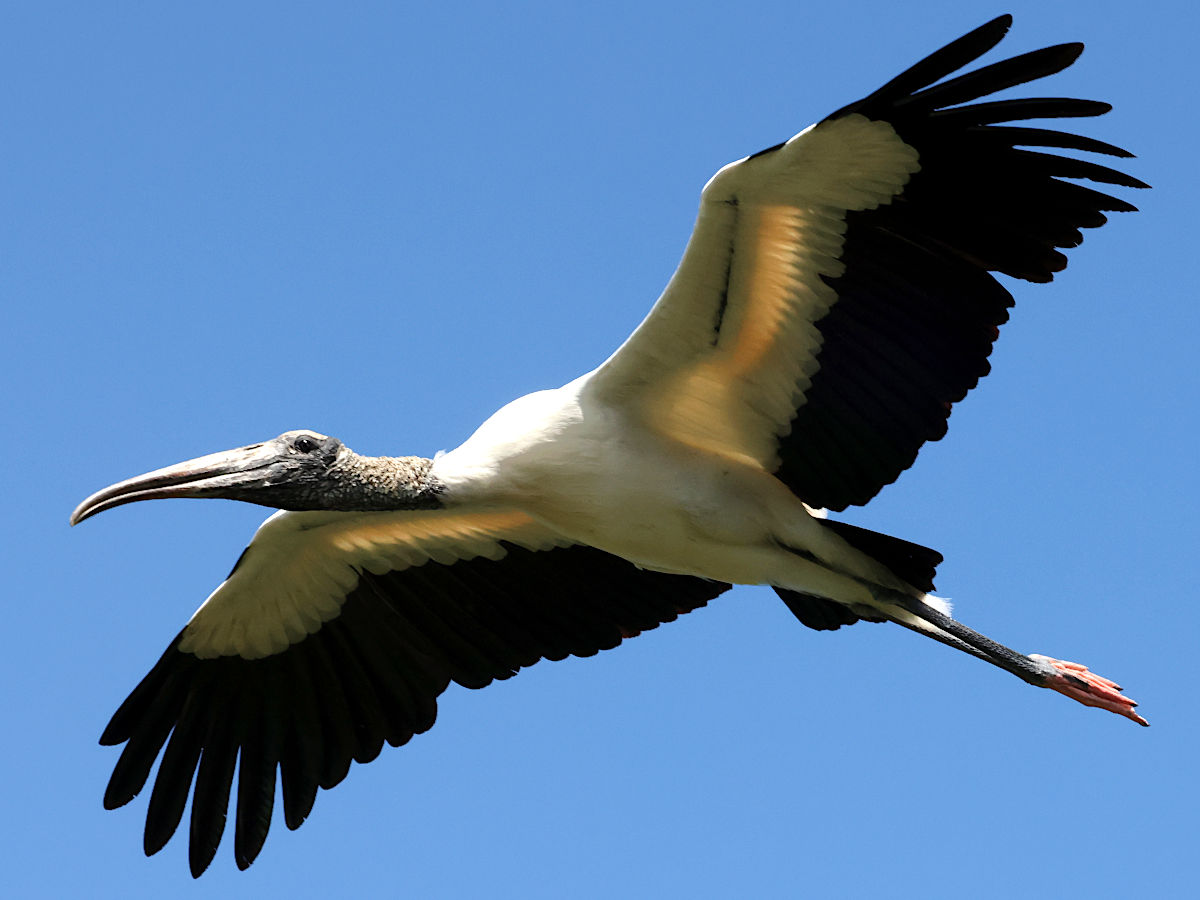
Gliding

When flying to foraging areas, the wood stork averages a speed of about 24.5 kilometres per hour (15.2 mph). In flapping flight, it does 34.5 kilometres per hour (21.4 mph), and about 20 kilometres per hour (12 mph) by gliding.

=== Excretion and thermoregulation ===
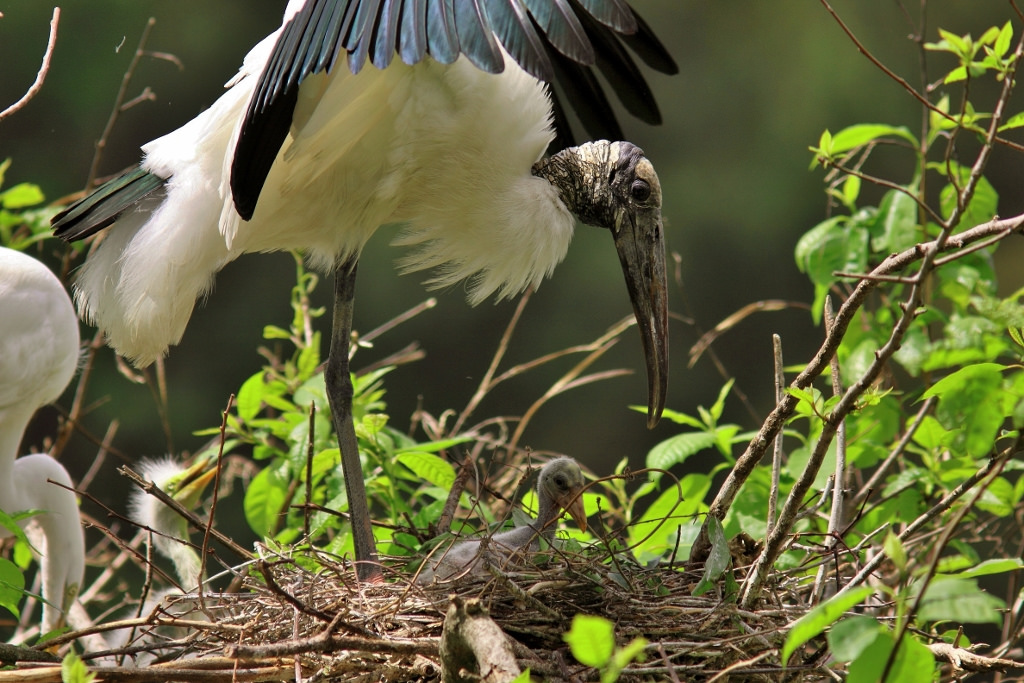
A wood stork shading its young

During the breeding season, the wood stork commonly defecates over the edge of its nest, while the chicks usually defecate inside. The method of defecation of the adult differs based on temperature. Normally, it excretes by leaning forward and slightly raising its tail, with the waste either going straight down or slightly backward. When weather is hot, though, the adult takes a different position, quickly moving its tail downward and forward while twisting its body around to aim at a leg that is bent backward (this is called urohidrosis). Which leg is aimed at is alternated. The excrement aimed at the legs is fluid and watery. It generally hits the legs around the middle of the unfeathered tibia, and runs down the leg as it is being directed by the scales. This results in evaporation, making this a method of thermoregulation. The temperature at which this starts is slightly above the threshold for panting, the latter of which takes place at temperatures of about 41.7 °C (107.1 °F) and above, compared to the normal body temperature around 40.7 °C (105.3 °F). In hot weather, breeding adults will also shade their chicks with their wings.

== Evolution ==
=== Fossil record ===
The species most likely evolved in tropical regions and its North American presence probably postdates the last ice age. A fossil fragment from the Touro Passo Formation found at Arroio Touro Passo (Rio Grande do Sul, Brazil) might be of the living species; it is at most from the Late Pleistocene age, a few tens of thousands of years ago. North American fossils from that time are of an extinct larger relative, M. wetmorei, which would be distinguished from the wood stork on the basis of size and on the basis of M. wetmorei's less curved mandible. This was probably a sister species; both occurred sympatrically on Cuba at the end of the Pleistocene.

=== Phylogenetics ===
- - Wood stork (M. americana)
  - - Yellow-billed stork (M. ibis)
    - - Milky stork (M. cinerea)
      - Painted stork (M. leucocephala)

Phylogeny of extant Mycteria.

Within storks (Ciconiidae), the genus Mycteria, which includes the wood stork and three other extant species, is the sister group to the clade containing the genera Ephippiorhynchus, Jabiru, and Ciconia. Based on molecular and cytogenetic data, the wood stork is the basal group, or the earliest diverging group, within the Myceria genus.

=== Genome ===
The wood stork has 72 chromosomes (2n = 72; 35 pairs of autosomes and one pair of sex chromosomes) as determined by karyotype analysis. Like all birds, the wood stork has a ZW sex-determination system in which males have a pair of similar chromosomes, ZZ, and females have a pair of dissimilar chromosomes, ZW. Thus, females are the heterogametic sex, while males are the homogametic sex. A highly contiguous genome assembly of the wood stork has been produced with 31 autosomal pairs and both sex chromosomes identified. Four chromosomal pairs were not identified; this is attributed to the small size of these particular chromosomes. Avian genomes tend to have about 10–12 pairs of large chromosomes and many smaller microchromosomes, gene-dense chromosomes with little repetitive genetic content.

== Conservation status ==
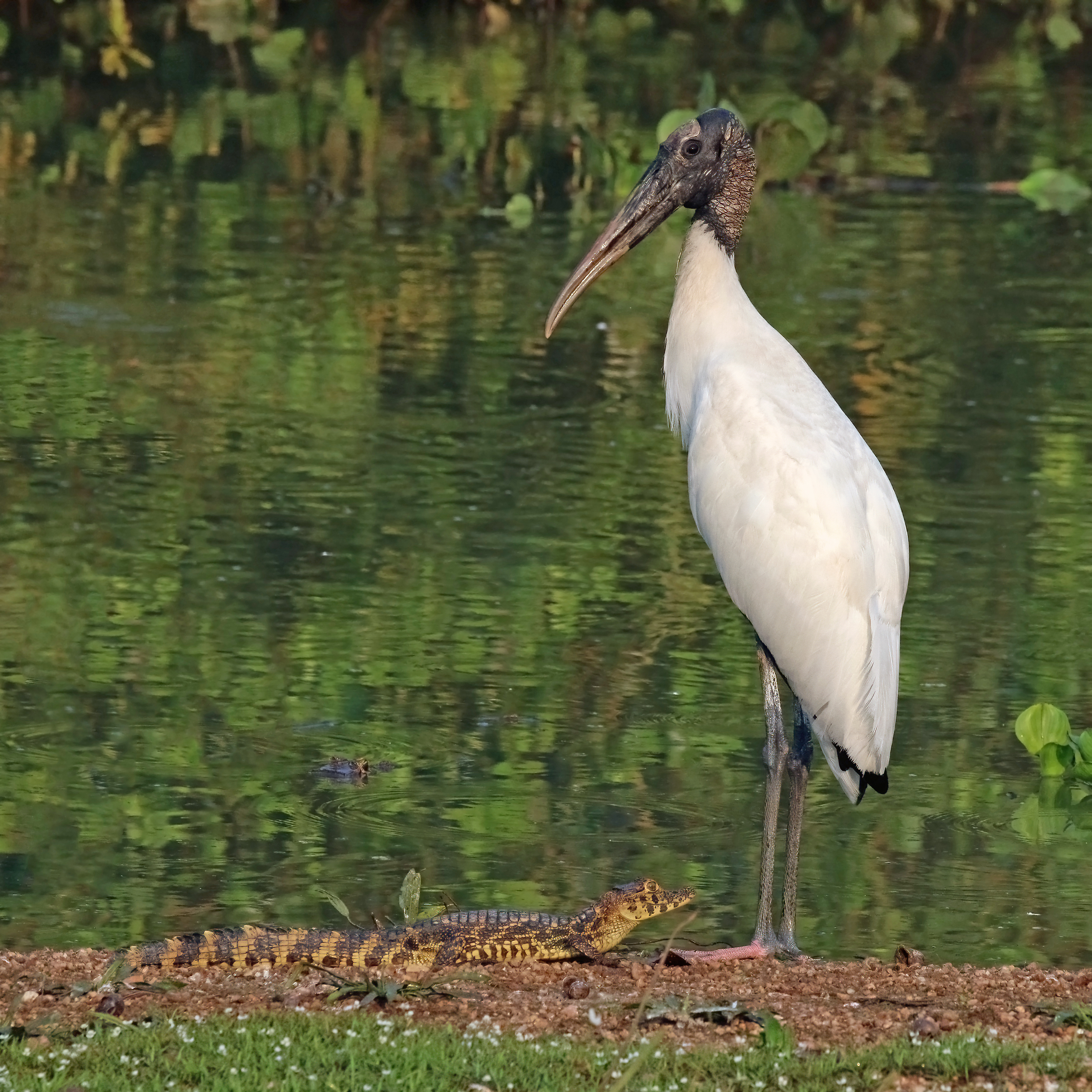
A wood stork and a juvenile yacare caiman in the Pantanal, Brazil

Globally, the wood stork is considered least concern by the International Union for Conservation of Nature due to its large range. In the United States, this bird is considered to be threatened, a recovery from its former status as endangered, which it held from 1984 to 2014 because of a decline in its population caused by habitat loss and drought. Similarly, in the state of Santa Catarina, Brazil, its decline seems to have been reversed; after an absence between the late 1960s and the mid-1990s, the species is now again regularly encountered there, in particular in the Tubarão River region. The Paraná River region's wetlands likely served as a stronghold of the species, from where it is now recolonizing some of its former habitats.

=== Threats ===
Hunting and egg collecting by humans has been implicated as a factor in the decline of South American wood storks. Humans also cause nest failures through ecotourism; disturbance by tourists can have an effect on nesting success, with a study finding that nests that had boats passing by them within about 20 metres (66 ft) had an average of 0.1 chicks fledging, compared to the normal rate for that area of about 0.9 chicks fledging per nest. Pedestrians watching from a distance of at least 75 metres (246 ft) did not significantly affect nesting success.

Habitat alteration has been implicated as the main threat to wood stork populations in the United States. In the Everglades, levee and drainage systems have caused the timing of water fluctuations to change, thus shifting the timing of nesting and consequently a decrease in population.
