= Syncuaria mycteriae =

Scientific classification
- Kingdom: Animalia
- Phylum: Nematoda
- Class: Chromadorea
- Order: Rhabditida
- Family: Acuariidae
- Genus: Syncuaria
- Species: S. mycteriae

Binomial name
- Syncuaria mycteriae Zhang, Brooks & Causey, 2003

Species of nematode

Syncuaria mycteriae, is a medium-sized parasitic nematode, first described in 2003. Birds of Ciconiiformes serve as the host. It is found in Costa Rica. It is most similar to S. leptoptili, a sister species, and S. squamata. However, it has longer left spicule than any other species in Syncuaria.
