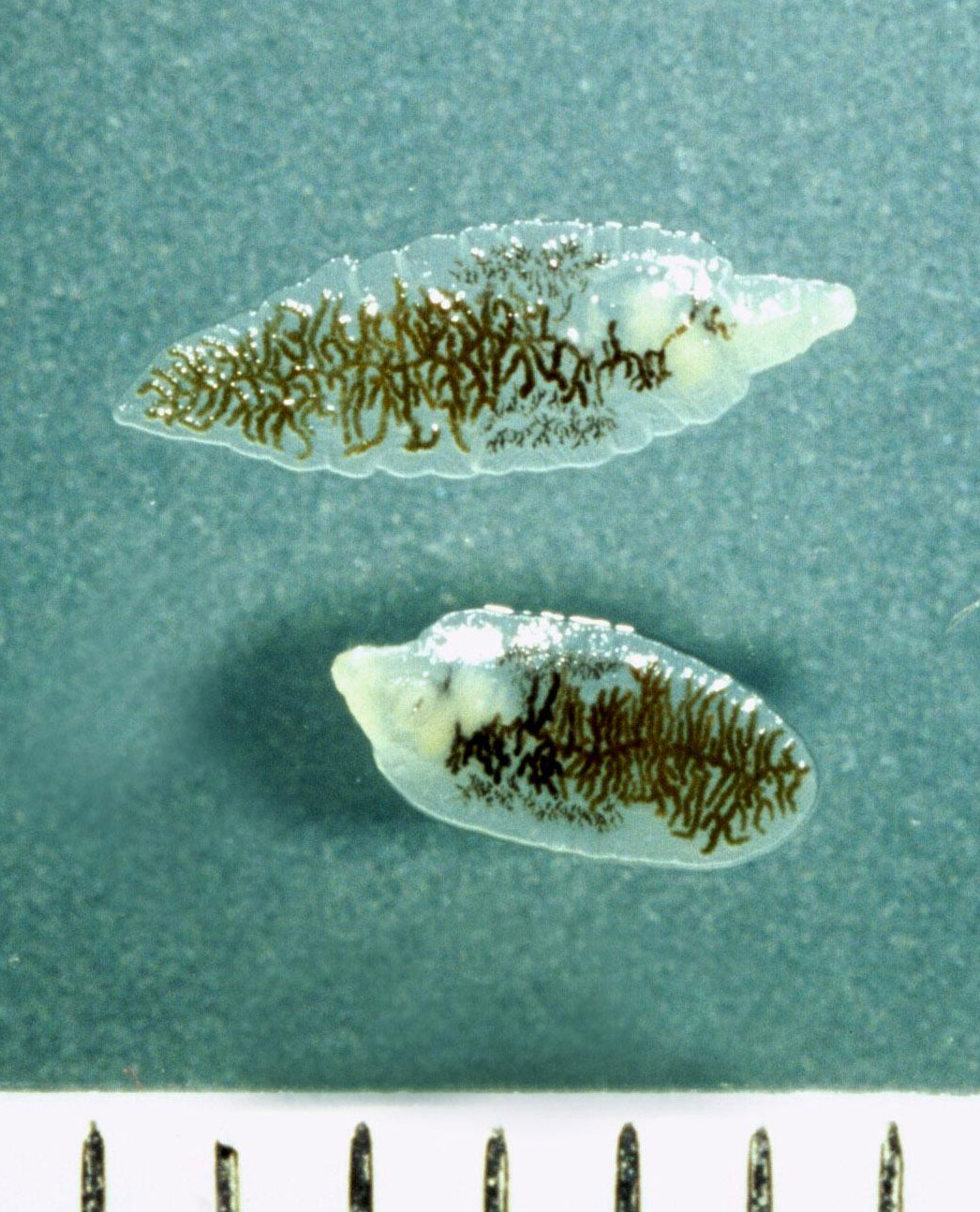

Scientific classification
- Kingdom: Animalia
- Phylum: Platyhelminthes
- Class: Trematoda
- Order: Plagiorchiida
- Family: Dicrocoeliidae
- Genus: Dicrocoelium
- Species: D. dendriticum

Binomial name
- Dicrocoelium dendriticum (Rudolphi, 1819)

= Dicrocoelium dendriticum =

Species of fluke

Dicrocoelium dendriticum, the lancet liver fluke, is a parasite fluke that tends to live in cattle or other grazing mammals.

== History of discovery ==
Much of what is presently known about Dicrocoelium dendriticum is the result of the work of the naturalist Wendell Krull. While D. dendriticum was discovered by Rudolphi in 1819 and D. hospes was discovered by Loos in 1899, the full life cycle was not known until Krull and C.R. Mapes published a series of papers from 1951 to 1953 detailing their observations and experiments. It was known that D. dendriticum infected sheep, but everything else was a mystery. The first link in the chain was the discovery of the first intermediate host, the land snail Cochlicopa lubrica (synonym: Cionella lubrica). Next came the discovery that the slime balls coughed up by the snails could be a potential method of transfer of the parasite. Shortly thereafter, the ant Formica fusca was found to be the second intermediate host by which sheep were infected. Their work is the foundation of modern understanding of the parasite.

== Clinical presentation in humans ==
Dicrocoelium dendriticum along with Dicrocoelium hospes are part of a group of flukes that can infect the bile ducts of humans. Because the bodies of these parasites are long and narrow, infections are generally confined to the more distal parts of the bile ducts. As a result, most Dicrocoelium dendriticum infections of the biliary tree produce only mild symptoms. These symptoms can include biliary colic and general digestive disturbances, including bloating and diarrhea. However, in heavier infections, bile ducts and the biliary epithelium may become enlarged in addition to the generation of fibrous tissue surrounding the ducts, and as a result, causing an enlarged liver (hepatomegaly) or inflammation of the liver (cirrhosis). In one unique case, an infection with Dicrocoelium dendriticum was associated with a skin rash urticaria.

== Transmission ==
Due to the highly specific nature of this parasite's life cycle, human infections are generally rare. Ruminants such as cattle, goats and sheep are usually the definitive host, but other herbivorous mammals and humans can also serve as definitive hosts through the ingestion of infected ants. One definitive case involved a man who ingested bottled water contaminated by infected ants.

== Reservoirs ==
The main reservoirs for Dicrocoelium dendriticum are sheep, cattle, land snails and ants. However, Dicrocoelium dendriticum has also been found in goats, pigs, llamas and alpacas.

== In ruminants ==
Ruminants are the main definitive host of this fluke but other herbivorous animals, carnivores, and humans can be an accidental definitive host. Most infections, especially in cattle, are sub-clinical but the effect on the liver depends on the number of flukes and the length of infection. Since the fluke migrates up the biliary duct — but does not penetrate the gut wall or liver tissue — long infections may cause hypertrophy of the bile duct and liver lesions, even in the absence of clinical signs. Some animals may show anemia, edema, emaciation, and liver cirrhosis. However, many of the clinical signs of dicroceliosis are similar to those of other gastro-, intestinal-, and lung-nematode infections.

The diagnosis of D. dendriticum flukes is mainly by the recovery of adults in the liver during necropsy or detecting eggs in animal feces.

There is some evidence connecting decreased liver function from the trematode infection with pregnancy toxaemia and mastitis in ewes when combined with other risk factors.

Treatment can be difficult due to the fluke's complex life-cycle. Various antihelminths, especially Netobimin, have been shown to be effective treatment when an entire herd is infected. Animal husbandry practices can decrease the incidence of infection. This includes the avoidance of animal grazing early in the day or late in the evening, when ants are more likely to climb to the top of the grass blade.

== Prepatent period ==
The prepatent period in the definitive host is 47 to 54 days. .

== Morphology ==
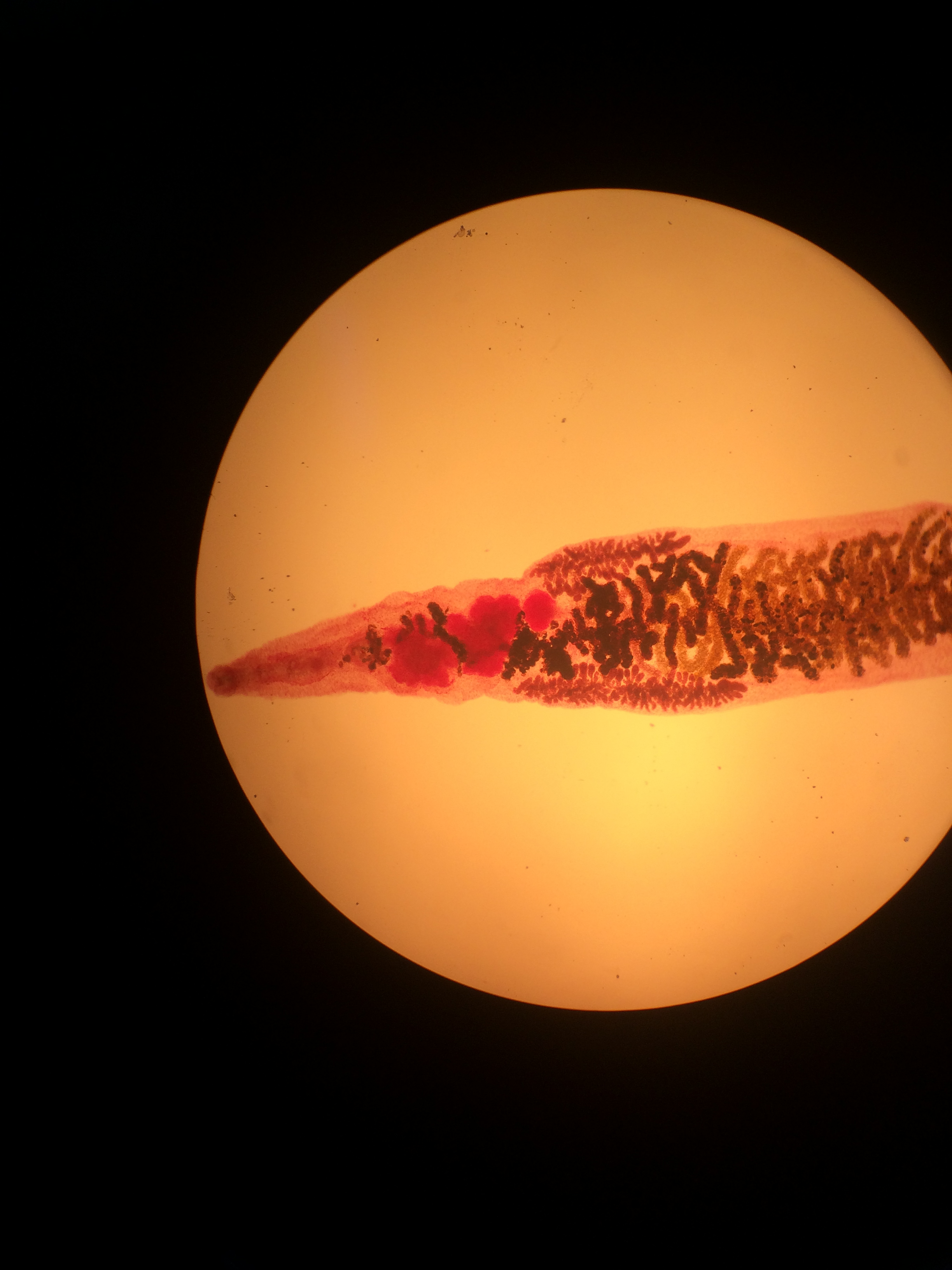
Mature Dicrocoelium dendriticum under microscope

Dicrocoelium dendriticum has a similar morphology to Clonorchis sinensis, the Chinese liver fluke. D. dendriticum is distinguished by lobed testes in the anterior of the body, as opposed to C. sinensis whose testes are located in the posterior. They both are flat and have a characteristic taper at the anterior and posterior ends. The anterior is distinguished by an oral sucker at the point, an acetabulum and the testes. The posterior is where the uterus lies. In the parasite's midsection lie the vitelline glands that are involved in egg formation.

== Life cycle ==
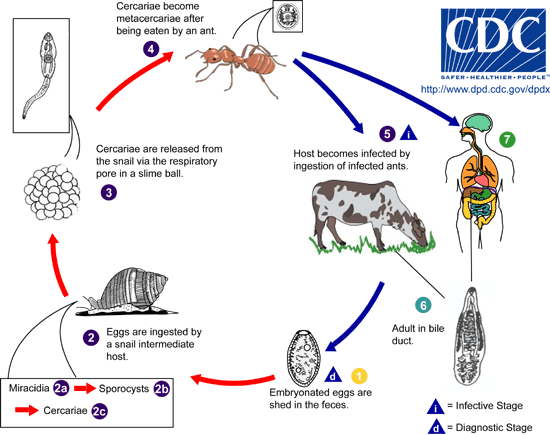
Dicrocoelium dendriticum life cycle

Dicrocoelium dendriticum spends its adult life inside the liver of its host. After mating, the eggs are excreted in the feces.

The first intermediate host, the terrestrial snail (Cochlicopa lubrica in the United States), consumes the feces, and becomes infected by the larval parasites. The larvae (or miracidium) drill through the wall of the gut and settle in its digestive tract, where they develop into a juvenile stage. The snail attempts to defend itself by walling the parasites off in cysts, which it then excretes and leaves behind in the grass or substrate.

The second intermediate host, an ant (Formica fusca in the United States), uses the trail of snail slime as a source of moisture. The ant then swallows a cyst loaded with hundreds of juvenile lancet flukes. The parasites enter the gut and then drift through its body.

Most of the cercariae encyst in the haemocoel of the ant and mature into metacercariae, but one moves to the sub-esophageal ganglion (a cluster of nerve cells underneath the esophagus). There, the fluke takes control of the ant's actions by manipulating these nerves. As evening approaches and the air cools, the infected ant is drawn away from other members of the colony and upward to the top of a blade of grass. Once there, it clamps its mandibles onto the top of the blade and stays there until dawn. Afterward, it goes back to its normal activity at the ant colony. If the host ant were to be subjected to the heat of the direct sun, it would die along with the parasite.

Night after night, the ant goes back to the top of a blade of grass until a grazing animal comes along and eats the blade, ingesting the ant along with it, thus infecting the definitive host. They live out their adult lives inside the animal, reproducing so that the cycle begins again. Infected ants may contain 100 metacercariae, and a high percentage of ants may be infected. Typical infections in cattle may be in the tens of thousands of adult worms.

== Diagnostic tests ==
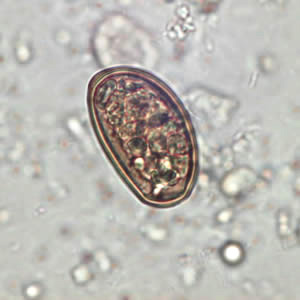
Dicrocoelium dendriticum egg in an unstained stool wet mount slide

Traditionally, diagnosis for dicrocoeliasis infection involves the identification of Dicrocoelium dendriticum eggs in the faeces of a human or other animal. However, in humans, eggs in the stool may be a result of ingesting raw infected animal liver and may not in fact indicate infection. Therefore, examining bile or duodenal fluid for eggs is a more accurate diagnostic technique in combination with a liver-free diet.

In animals, diagnosis has traditionally involved fecal examination or post-mortem examination of the liver. Recently, an ELISA using a Dicrocoelium dendriticum antigen was able to identify cases of infection in sheep 28 days earlier than traditional methods.

== Management and therapy ==
Because human infections with Dicrocoelium dendriticum are so rare, there are multiple suggestions for treatment. The standard treatment is an anthelmintic such as Praziquantel, Triclabendazole, or Mirazid.

== Epidemiology ==
Dicrocoeliosis is believed to be endemic or potentially endemic in 30 countries. Dicrocoelium dendriticum is found throughout Europe (former U.S.S.R., Switzerland, Italy, Germany, Spain, Turkey), the Middle East (Iran), Asia (China, Japan, Vietnam), Africa (Ghana, Nigeria, Sierra Leone) and in North and South America and Australia. The parasite tends to be found in areas that favor the intermediate hosts, such as fields with dry, chalky and alkaline soils.

== Public health prevention strategies ==
Current public health prevention strategies have involved the condemnation of contaminated livers so as to eliminate any possibility for food-borne infection.

In addition, in 2007 the World Health Organization included Dicrocoelium dendriticum on its list of organisms to target with its Foodborne Disease Burden Epidemiology Reference Group.

In addition, a study completed in Sweden combining data about the prevalence of Dicrocoelium dendriticum and landscape data to discover in which landscape the parasite thrives. It was found that grazing land near forest areas (good for mollusks) and dry pastures with little other biodiversity (good for ants) both increased parasite prevalence.
