= Skrjabinoclava kinsellai =

Scientific classification
- Domain: Eukaryota
- Kingdom: Animalia
- Phylum: Nematoda
- Class: Chromadorea
- Order: Rhabditida
- Family: Acuariidae
- Genus: Skrjabinoclava
- Species: S. kinsellai

Binomial name
- Skrjabinoclava kinsellai Anderson and Wong, 1994

Species of roundworm

Skrjabinoclava kinsellai is a parasitic nematode worm that infects the marsh rice rat (Oryzomys palustris) in Florida.

In 1988, Mike Kinsella was the first to report Skrjabinoclava nematodes in Florida marsh rice rats. He identified the worm as Skrjabinoclava thapari, a species originally described from crab-eating raccoons (Procyon cancrivorus) in Brazil. In 1994, R.C. Anderson and P.L. Wong published an article comparing the rice rat Skrjabinoclava to Brazilian S. thapari and concluded that the two belonged to different species. They named the former as a new species, Skrjabinoclava kinsellai, with the specific name honoring Mike Kinsella. S. thapari has also been recorded from Florida American white ibises (Eudocimus albus), but Anderson and Wong could not examine the specimens and were consequently unable to determine whether these worms are S. thapari or S. kinsellai. S. thapari and S. kinsellai are remarkable for infecting mammalian hosts, as Skrjabinoclava are normally bird parasites.

Skrjabinoclava kinsellai is a small and delicate worm. In the male, the left spicule (a spine-like copulatory structure) ends with a shoe-like form, not with a tapered, rounded end as in S. thapari. Both males and females have small structures resembling nipples on the ends of their tails, which are absent in S. thapari. Total length is 2.6 to 2.8 mm (0.10 to 0.11 in) in males and 3.4 to 4.9 mm (0.13 to 0.19 in) in females. Maximum width is 55 to 81 μm in males and 100 to 142 μm in females, esophagus length is 612 to 845 μm in males and 823 to 1000 μm in females, and tail length 76 to 112 μm in males and 80 to 90 μm in females.

Of 110 marsh rice rats studied in Florida by Kinsella, 30 were infected by S. kinsellai, with one to ten (average four) worms present per rat. The worms are in the stomach. Larvae found in the crab Uca pugilator may belong to Skrjabinoclava and the crab may serve as an intermediate host.

== Literature cited ==
- Anderson, R.C. and Wong, P.L. 1994. Skrjabinoclava kinsellai n. sp. (Nematoda: Acuarioidea) from the rice rat Oryzomys palustris in Florida. Systematic Parasitology 28:1–4.
