= Platynosomum capranum =

Scientific classification
- Kingdom: Animalia
- Phylum: Platyhelminthes
- Class: Trematoda
- Order: Plagiorchiida
- Family: Dicrocoeliidae
- Genus: Platynosomum
- Species: P. capranum

Binomial name
- Platynosomum capranum (Ku, 1957)

Species of fluke

Platynosomum capranum is a species of trematodes found mainly in Kunming, Mainland China. It is the 4th species of Platynosomum found to be parasitic of mammals and the first species in this genus recorded from China.
