= Dicrocoelium hospes =

Scientific classification
- Kingdom: Animalia
- Phylum: Platyhelminthes
- Class: Trematoda
- Order: Plagiorchiida
- Family: Dicrocoeliidae
- Genus: Dicrocoelium
- Species: D. hospes

Binomial name
- Dicrocoelium hospes Looss, 1907

Species of flatworm

Dicrocoelium hospes is a species of flatworms belonging to the family Dicrocoeliidae.

The species may cause the disease dicrocoeliasis.
