= Skrjabinoclava =

Scientific classification
- Kingdom: Animalia
- Phylum: Nematoda
- Class: Chromadorea
- Order: Rhabditida
- Family: Acuariidae
- Genus: Skrjabinoclava; Sobolev, 1943

Genus of roundworms

Skrjabinoclava is a genus of nematodes belonging to the family Acuariidae.

The species of this genus are found in America.

Species:

- Skrjabinoclava aculeata (Creplin, 1825) Sobolev, 1943
- Skrjabinoclava albae Anderson & Wong, 1992
- Skrjabinoclava alii Ali, 1968
- Skrjabinoclava amaurornae Schmidt & Kuntz, 1972
- Skrjabinoclava andersoni Cremonte & Navone, 1999
- Skrjabinoclava bakeri Wong & Anderson, 1987
- Skrjabinoclava bartlettae Wong & Anderson, 1988
- Skrjabinoclava brevispicula Bondarenko & Daiya, 1971
- Skrjabinoclava cincli (Yamaguti, 1935) Sobolev, 1943
- Skrjabinoclava decorata (Solonitzin, 1928) Sobolev, 1943
- Skrjabinoclava deltensis Anderson & Wong, 1994
- Skrjabinoclava halcyoni Ryzhikov & Khokhlova, 1964
- Skrjabinoclava hartwichi Wong & Anderson, 1987
- Skrjabinoclava horrida (Rudolphi, 1809) Sobolev, 1943
- Skrjabinoclava inornatae Wong & Anderson, 1987
- Skrjabinoclava kinsellai Anderson & Wong, 1994
- Skrjabinoclava kristjani Anderson & Wong, 1992
- Skrjabinoclava kritscheri Wong & Anderson, 1987
- Skrjabinoclava longifuniculata Sobolev, 1952
- Skrjabinoclava morrisoni Wong & Anderson, 1987
- Skrjabinoclava myersi Wong & Anderson, 1987
- Skrjabinoclava pusillae Wong & Anderson, 1987
- Skrjabinoclava rallae Schmidt & Kuntz, 1972
- Skrjabinoclava sealyi Anderson & Wong, 1992
- Skrjabinoclava semipalmatae Wong & Anderson, 1987
- Skrjabinoclava skulasoni Anderson & Wong, 1992
- Skrjabinoclava snorrasoni Anderson & Wong, 1992
- Skrjabinoclava solonitzini Sobolev, 1943
- Skrjabinoclava soricis (Tiner, 1951)
- Skrjabinoclava thapari Freitas, 1953
- Skrjabinoclava tupacincai Freitas & Ibanez, 1970
- Skrjabinoclava venusta (Schmidt & Kuntz, 1972) Chabaud, 1975
- Skrjabinoclava vogurensis Anderson & Wong, 1992
- Skrjabinoclava wilsoniae Wong & Anderson, 1987
