= Platynosomum =

Scientific classification
- Kingdom: Animalia
- Phylum: Platyhelminthes
- Class: Trematoda
- Order: Plagiorchiida
- Family: Dicrocoeliidae
- Genus: Platynosomum; Looss, 1907

Genus of flatworms

Platynosomum is a genus of flatworms belonging to the family Dicrocoeliidae.

The genus has cosmopolitan distribution.

Species:

- Platynosomum acuminatum Nicoll, 1915
- Platynosomum alectoris Nöller & Enigk, 1933
- Platynosomum allentoshi Foster, 1939
- Platynosomum amazonensis Kingston & Cosgrove, 1967
- Platynosomum andersoni Ko, 1976
- Platynosomum angrense Travassos, 1919
- Platynosomum arietis Travassos, 1918
- Platynosomum beltrani Caballero y C. & Caballero R., 1970
- Platynosomum burrman Cribb & Spratt, 1992
- Platynosomum butei (Zeljaskova-Paspaleva, 1962)
- Platynosomum capranum Ku, 1957
- Platynosomum clathratum (Deslongchamps, 1824)
- Platynosomum costaricense Brenes, Arroyo & Munoz, 1966
- Platynosomum fallax Heidegger & Mendheim, 1938
- Platynosomum fastosum Kossack, 1910
- Platynosomum furnarii Vogelsang & Cordero, 1928
- Platynosomum illiciens (Braun, 1901)
- Platynosomum kirgisensis Panin & Tokobaev, 1974
- Platynosomum marmoseti Kingston & Cosgrove, 1967
- Platynosomum marquesi Travassos, 1922
- Platynosomum mazzai Vogelsang & Cordero, 1928
- Platynosomum muris (Stscherbakova, 1942)
- Platynosomum passeris Yamashita & Tsumura, 1962
- Platynosomum philippinorum Tubangui, 1928
- Platynosomum planicipitis Cameron, 1928
- Platynosomum pyrrhocoraxi Panin & Tokobaev, 1974
- Platynosomum rutshurensis Baer, 1959
- Platynosomum semifuscum Looss, 1907
- Platynosomum ventroplicatum Heidegger & Mendheim, 1938
- Platynosomum verschureni Baer, 1959
