= Synhimantus =

Scientific classification
- Kingdom: Animalia
- Phylum: Nematoda
- Class: Chromadorea
- Order: Rhabditida
- Family: Acuariidae
- Genus: Synhimantus; Railliet, Henry & Sisoff, 1912

Synonyms
- Dispharynx Railliet, Henry & Sisoff, 1912

Genus of roundworms

Synhimantus is a genus of nematodes belonging to the family Acuariidae.

Species:

- Synhimantus australiensis Johnston & Mawson, 1941
- Synhimantus bubulcusi Kumar & Gupta, 1980
- Synhimantus canadensis Mawson, 1956
- Synhimantus coucalus Dey Sarkar, 1995
- Synhimantus elliptica Molin, 1858
- Synhimantus falco Mawson, 1982
- Synhimantus falconis Kutzer, Frey & Kotremba, 1980
- Synhimantus groffi Li, 1934
- Synhimantus hamatus Linstow, 1877
- Synhimantus hanumanthai Rautela & Malhotra, 1987
- Synhimantus hyderabadensis Ali, 1968
- Synhimantus invaginata Linstow, 1901
- Synhimantus kanpurensis Gupta & Shukla, 1987
- Synhimantus laticeps Rudolphi, 1819
- Synhimantus lichenostomi Mawson, 1982
- Synhimantus longigutturatus Chandler, 1942
- Synhimantus magnipapillatus Vicente, Magalhaes-Pinto & Noronha, 1996
- Synhimantus nipponensis Yamaguti, 1941
- Synhimantus oti Zhang, Liu & Song, 2005
- Synhimantus pelecani (Johnston & Mawson, 1942)
- Synhimantus petrowi Rodonaja, 1956
- Synhimantus podargi Mawson, 1982
- Synhimantus rectus Molin, 1860
- Synhimantus robertdollfusi Desportes, 1947
- Synhimantus sirry Khalil, 1931
- Synhimantus subrectus Gendre, 1921
- Synhimantus zosteropsi Cid del Prado, Maggenti & van Riper, 1985
