= Acuaria =

Scientific classification
- Kingdom: Animalia
- Phylum: Nematoda
- Class: Chromadorea
- Order: Rhabditida
- Family: Acuariidae
- Genus: Acuaria; Bremser, 1811

Genus of nematodes

Acuaria is a genus of nematodes belonging to the family Acuariidae.

The genus has cosmopolitan distribution.

Species:

- Acuaria anthuris (Rudolphi, 1819)
- Acuaria attenuata (Rudolphi, 1819)
- Acuaria brumpti Chabaud & Petter, 1961
- Acuaria cordata (Müller, 1897)
- Acuaria dollfusi Chabaud & Petter, 1961
- Acuaria europaea Mutafchiev, Mariaux & Georgiev, 2017
- Acuaria galliardi Chabaud & Petter, 1961
- Acuaria gruveli (Gendre, 1913)
- Acuaria hamulosa (Diesing, 1851)
- Acuaria muscicapae von Linstow, 1878
- Acuaria ornata Gendre, 1912
- Acuaria papillifera von Linstow, 1878
- Acuaria parorioli Chabaud & Petter, 1961
- Acuaria phalacrocoracis (Smogorjevskaja, 1961)
- Acuaria serpentocephala Gilbert, 1930
- Acuaria skrjabini Ozerskaya, 1926
- Acuaria spiralis Molin, 1858
- Acuaria subula (Dujardin, 1845)
- Acuaria tenuis Dujardin, 1845
