= Haemoproteus crumenium =

Scientific classification
- Domain: Eukaryota
- Clade: Sar
- Clade: Alveolata
- Phylum: Apicomplexa
- Class: Aconoidasida
- Order: Chromatorida
- Family: Haemoproteidae
- Genus: Haemoproteus
- Species: H. crumenium

Binomial name
- Haemoproteus crumenium (Hirst, 1905)

Species of single-celled organism

Haemoproteus crumenium is a haemoproteid parasite first described in 1905. Birds of the family Ciconiidae serve as the host. From an early stage of development it tends to take up a lateral position within infected cells. While it usually has an irregular outline while developing, by maturity it has clearly rounded ends. Even fully-grown it almost never takes up more than two-thirds of the cell it hosts in.
