= Syncuaria =

Scientific classification
- Domain: Eukaryota
- Kingdom: Animalia
- Phylum: Nematoda
- Class: Chromadorea
- Order: Rhabditida
- Family: Acuariidae
- Genus: Syncuaria

Genus of roundworms

Syncuaria is a genus of parasites in the family Acuariidae, first described in 1927. They are usually found in the gizzard lining of the aquatic birds that they parasitize which belong to Pelecaniformes, Ciconiiformes and Podicipediformes. The genus is characterized by, among other things, cordons on the bodies lateral sides that are linked by anastomosis, and monodelphy. Synonyms include: Skrjabinocara (Kurashvili), Chordocephalus (Alegret), and Decorataria (Sobolev).
