= Acuariidae =

Scientific classification
- Kingdom: Animalia
- Phylum: Nematoda
- Class: Chromadorea
- Order: Rhabditida
- Suborder: Spirurida
- Family: Acuariidae; Railliet, Henry & Sisoff, 1912

Genera
- About 40, see text

Synonyms
- Acuariidae Seurat, 1913 Spiropteridae Leiper, 1911 Streptocaridae Skrjabin, Sobolev & Ivashkin, 1965

Family of roundworms

Acuariidae is a family of spirurian nematodes. Like all nematodes, they have neither a circulatory nor a respiratory system. They are the only family in superfamily Acuarioidea, and number about 40 genera and 300 species, most of which are parasites of birds.

== Genera ==
Several genera, particularly in the Seuratiinae, are monotypic. At least some of them are liable to be invalid.

Subfamily Acuariinae Railliet, Henry & Sisoff, 1912

- Acuaria Bremser, 1811
- Cheilospirura Diesing, 1861
- Chevreuxia Seurat, 1918
- Chordatortilis Mendonça & Rodrigues, 1965
- Chordocephalus Alegret, 1941
- Cosmocephalus Molin, 1858
- Decorataria Sobolev, 1949 (sometimes included in Syncuaria)
- Desportesius Chabaud & Campana, 1949
- Dispharynx Railliet, Henry & Sisoff, 1912 (sometimes included in Synhimantus)
- Echinuria Soloviev, 1912
- Paracuaria Krishna Rao, 1951
- Pectinospirura Wehr, 1933
- Sexansocara Sobolev & Sudarikov, 1939
- Skrjabinocerca Shikhoblaova, 1930
- Skrjabinoclava Sobolev, 1943
- Stammerinema Osche, 1955
- Syncuaria Gilbert, 1927 (sometimes included in Echinuria)
- Synhimantus Railliet, Henry & Sisoff, 1912
- Willmottia Mawson, 1982
- Xenocordon Mawson, 1982

Subfamily Schistorophinae Travassos, 1918

- Ancyracanthopsis Diesing, 1861
- Quasithelazia Maplestone, 1932 (sometimes included in Schistorophus)
- Schistorophus Railliet, 1916
- Sciadiocara Skrjabin, 1916
- Viktorocara Guschanskaja, 1950

Subfamily Seuratiinae Chitwood & Wehr, 1932

- Aviculariella Wehr, 1931
- Ingliseria Gibson, 1968
- Proyseria Petter, 1959
- Pseudohaplonema Wang et al., 1978
- Rusguniella Seurat, 1919
- Seuratia Skrjabin, 1916
- Stegophorus Wehr, 1934
- Streptocara Railliet, Henry & Sisoff, 1912

Incertae sedis

- Antechiniella Quentin & Beveridge, 1986
- Chandleronema Little & Ali, 1980
- Cyclopsinema Cobb, 1927
- Deliria Vicente, Magalhaes Pinto & Noronha, 1980
- Molinacuaria Wong & Lankester, 1985
- Pseudoaviculariella Gupta & Jehan, 1971
- Tikusnema Hasegawa, Shiraishi & Rochma, 1992
- Voguracuaria Wong & Anderson, 1993
