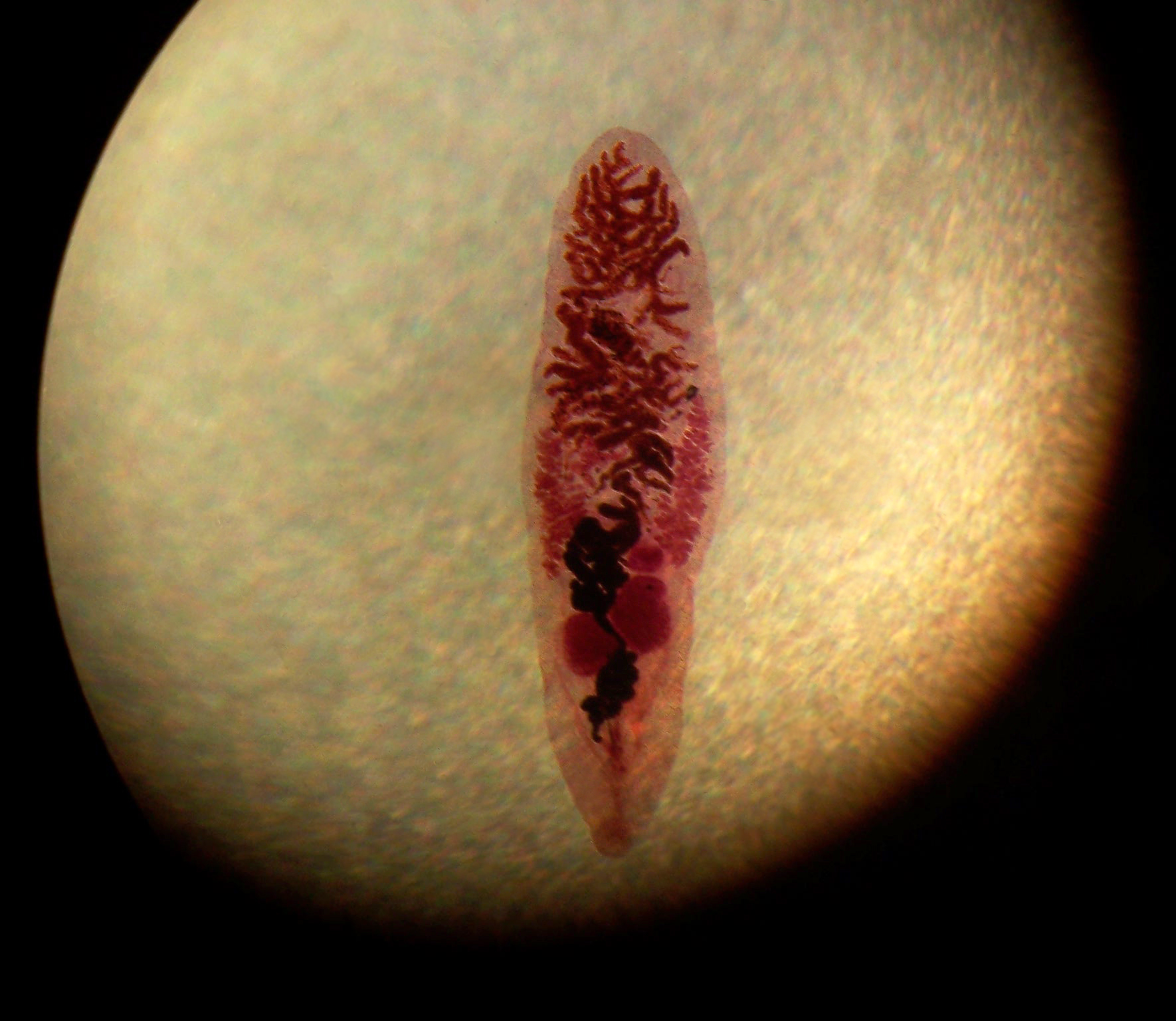
- Dicrocoelium dendriticum

Scientific classification
- Kingdom: Animalia
- Phylum: Platyhelminthes
- Class: Trematoda
- Order: Plagiorchiida
- Suborder: Xiphidiata
- Superfamily: Gorgoderoidea
- Family: Dicrocoeliidae; Looss, 1899

Synonyms
- Dicrocoelidae

= Dicrocoeliidae =

Family of flatworms

Dicrocoeliidae is a family of flatworms belonging to the order Plagiorchiida.

== Genera ==
Genera:

- Allocorrigia Turner & Corkum, 1977
- Athesmia Looss, 1899
- Brachydistomum , 1944
- Brachylecithum Shtrom, 1940
- Brodenia Gedoelst, 1913
- Caballerolecythus Lamothe-Argumedo, Falcón-Ordaz, García-Prieto & Fernández-Fernández, 2005
- Concinnum Bhalerao, 1936
- Conspicuum Bhalerao, 1936
- Controrchis Price, 1928
- Corrigia Shtrom, 1940
- Dicrocoelium Dujardin, 1845
- Dictyonograptus Travassos, 1919
- Euparadistomum Tubangui, 1931
- Eurytrema Looss, 1907
- Infidum Travassos, 1916
- Lubens Bhalerao, 1936
- Lubens Travassos, 1920
- Lutztrema Travassos, 1941
- Lyperosomum Looss, 1899
- Paradistomum Kossack, 1910
- Platynosomum Looss, 1907
- Pojmanskatrema Hildebrand & Tkach, 2019
- Proacetabulorchis Gogate, 1940
- Prosolecithus Yamaguti, 1971
- Pseudoparadistomum Roca, 2003
- Robertdigenea Caballero y Caballero & Caballero, 1970
- Skrjabinus Bhalerao, 1936
- Stromitrema Skrjabin, 1944
- Unilaterilecithum Oschmarin, 1952
- Yungasicola Gardner & Perez-Ponce De Leon, 2002
- Zonorchis Travassos, 1944
