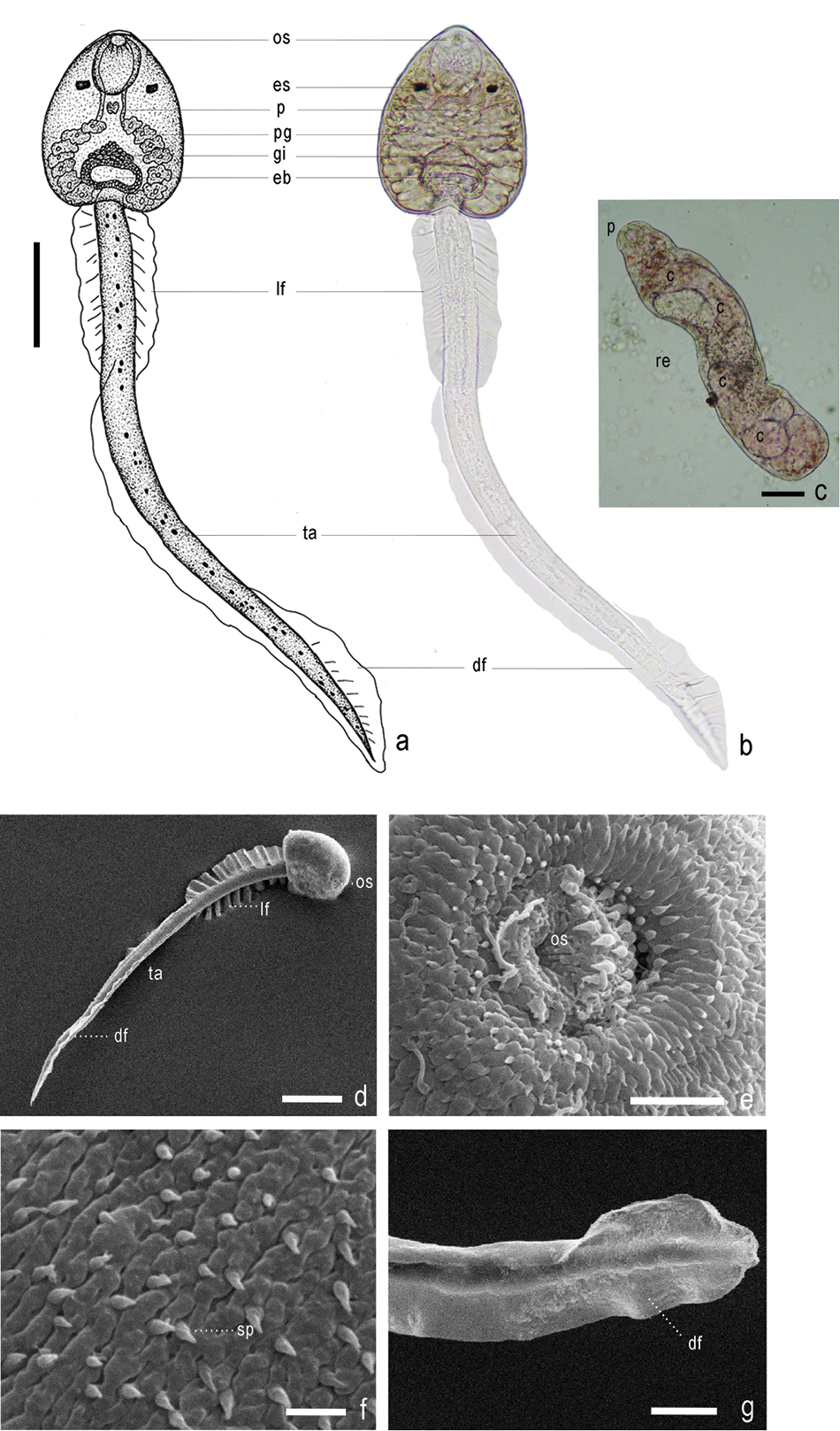

Scientific classification
- Kingdom: Animalia
- Phylum: Platyhelminthes
- Class: Trematoda
- Order: Plagiorchiida
- Family: Heterophyidae
- Genus: Haplorchis
- Species: H. taichui

Binomial name
- Haplorchis taichui (Nishigori, 1924)

Synonyms
- Monorchotrema taichui Nishigori, 1924; Monorchotrema microrchia Katsuda, 1932; Haplorchis microrchis Yamaguti, 1958

= Haplorchis taichui =

Species of fluke

Haplorchis taichui is a species of intestinal fluke in the family Heterophyidae. It is a human parasite.

== Distribution ==
This species occurs in: Taiwan, the Philippines, Bangladesh, India, Sri Lanka, Palestine, Iraq, Egypt, Malaysia, Thailand, Laos, Vietnam, and South China.

== Life cycle ==
The first intermediate hosts of Heterophyes nocens include freshwater snails Melania obliquegranosa, Stenomelania juncea, and Melanoides tuberculata.

The second intermediate host include freshwater fish: Cyclocheilichthys repasson, goldfish Carassius auratus, Cyprinus carpio, Gambusia affinis, Hampala dispar, Labiobarbus leptocheilus, Puntius binotatus, Puntius brevis, Puntius gonionotus, Javean barb, Barbodes palata, Pseudorasbora parva, Rhodeus ocellatus, Zacco platypus, Raiamas guttatus, Mystacoleucus marginatus, and Siamese mud carp Henicorhynchus siamensis.

Natural definitive hosts are fish-eating animals: dogs, cats, birds, and humans.

== Effects on human health ==
=== Symptoms ===
Infections are commonly caused by consuming undercooked cyprinoid fish. Haplorchis taichui- specific symptoms are hard to study due to frequent co-infections with other helminthic worms. One study examined over 2,500 participants from the Nan Province in northern Thailand. They found that >50% of people infected with Haplorchis taichui showed some gastrointestinal symptoms, predominantly pallor, abdominal pain, excessive gas and loose feces, similar to irritable bowel syndrome.

=== Diagnosis and treatment ===
Oxyresveratrol, a stilbenoid found in extracts of Artocarpus lakoocha is effective against Haplorchis taichui.
