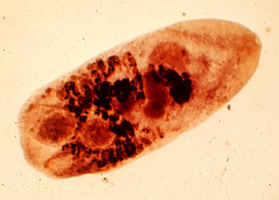

Scientific classification
- Kingdom: Animalia
- Phylum: Platyhelminthes
- Class: Trematoda
- Order: Plagiorchiida
- Family: Heterophyidae
- Genus: Metagonimus
- Species: M. yokogawai

Binomial name
- Metagonimus yokogawai (Katsurada, 1912)

Synonyms
- Heterophyes yokogawai Katsurada, 1912; Loxotrema yokogawai (Katsurada, 1912); Yokogawa yokogawai (Katsurada, 1912)

= Metagonimus yokogawai =

Species of fluke

Metagonimus yokogawai, or the Yokogawa fluke, is a species of a trematode, or fluke worm, in the family Heterophyidae.

It is a human parasite causing metagonimiasis. It is among a few species of Metagonimus that cause metagonimiasis diseases (others being M. takahashii and M. miyatai).

== Distribution ==
This species occurs in Korea, China, Taiwan, Japan, Russia, Indonesia, Israel, and Spain. This species is found in areas with sweetfish, and that includes western and eastern riversides. It is basically found in places with water.

== Description ==
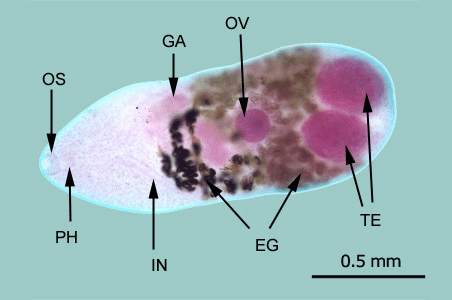
Adult Metagonimus yokogawai

Metagonimus yokogawai has adult flukes that parasitize the small intestine and causes inflammation. This species was discovered by Fujiro Katsurada with egg samples from Japan and Taiwan With this discovery, he was able to make a new genus of trematodes that this new parasite would fall under The size of these eggs are about 29 μm. Evidence also suggest that this parasite was present during the Yi dynasty.

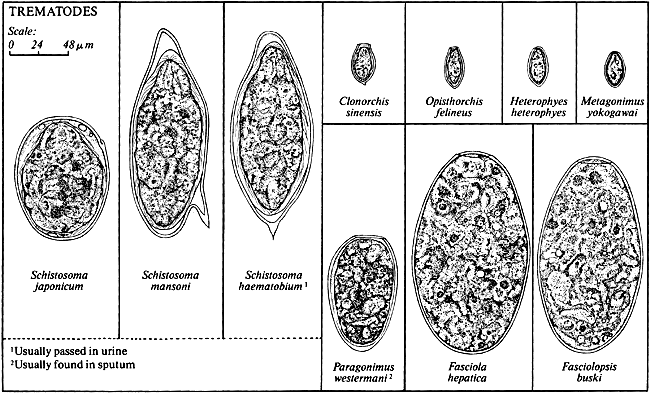
Different species of trematodes

== Life cycle ==
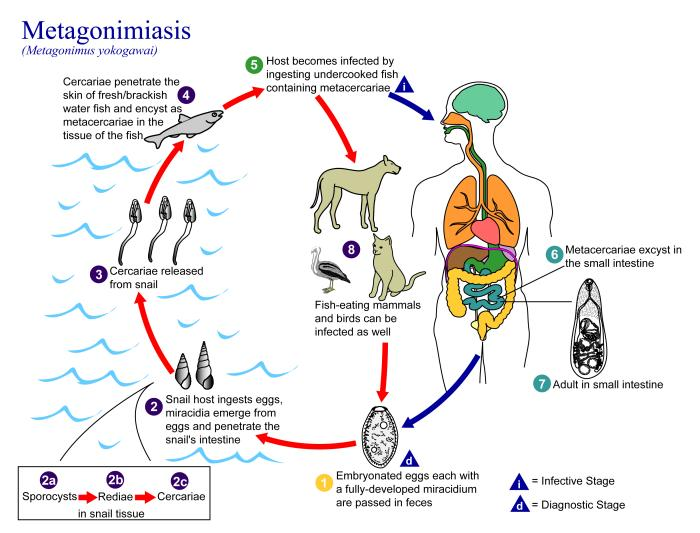
Life cycle of Metagonimus yokogawai

The first intermediate hosts of Metagonimus yokogawai include freshwater snails Semisulcospira libertina, Semisulcospira coreana, and Semisulcospira reiniana.

The second intermediate host include freshwater fish: Plecoglossus altivelis, Tribolodon hakonensis, Tribolodon ezoe, and Lateolabrax japonicus.

Natural definitive hosts are: dogs, cats, rats, and humans. Experminetal type hosts are: Syrian golden hamster.

Here, the life cycle of Metagonimus yokogawai will be examined, however Metagonimus takahashii and Metagonimus miyatai follow similar life cycle pattern. All three species are hermaphroditic and capable of self-fertilization. Embryonated eggs are passed into an aquatic environment (fresh or brackish water) each containing a fully developed larva, called a miracidium. Development cannot proceed past this stage unless the eggs are ingested by the first intermediary host, freshwater snails. After the snail host ingests the eggs, miracidia emerge and penetrate the snail's intestines. In the snail tissue, mircadia develop into sporocysts, then rediae, and finally emerge from the snail as cercariae. The cercariae then penetrate the skin or go under the scale of a fresh or brackish water fish and encyst as metacercariae in the tissue. The type of fish that serves as secondary host varies based on location. The host then becomes infected by consuming undercooked, raw, or pickled fish containing the infectious metacercariae. The metacercariae then excyst in the small intestine of the host (human, mammal or bird), and develop into adults. In the small intestine, the adults attach to the walls and develop new eggs.
