= Acanthotrema cursitans =

Scientific classification
- Kingdom: Animalia
- Phylum: Platyhelminthes
- Class: Trematoda
- Order: Plagiorchiida
- Family: Heterophyidae
- Genus: Acanthotrema
- Species: A. cursitans

Binomial name
- Acanthotrema cursitans (Holliman, 1961)

Synonyms
- Cercaria cursitans Holliman, 1961; Stictodora cursitans Kinsella and Heard, 1974; Acanthotrema cursitans Sohn, Han, and Chai, 2003

Species of fluke

Acanthotrema cursitans is a species of fluke in the genus Acanthotrema. It infects the marsh rice rat Oryzomys palustris, the raccoon Procyon lotor, the Virginia opossum Didelphis virginiana, the snail Cerithidea scalariformis, and killifishes of the genus Fundulus on the Gulf Coast of Florida. It was first described as Cercaria cursitans in 1961, then moved to Stictodora in 1974, and to Acanthotrema in 2003.

== See also ==
- List of parasites of the marsh rice rat

== Literature cited ==
- Kinsella, J.M. and Heard, R.W., III. 1974. Morphology and life cycle of Stictodora cursitans n. comb. (Trematoda: Heterophyidae) from mammals in Florida salt marshes (subscription required). Transactions of the American Microscopical Society 93(3):408–412.
- Sohn, W.-M., Han, E.-T. and Chai, J.-Y. 2003. Acanthotrema felis n. sp. (Digenea: Heterophyidae) from the small intestine of stray cats in the Republic of Korea (subscription required). The Journal of Parasitology 89(1):154–158.
