= Galactosomum =

Scientific classification
- Kingdom: Animalia
- Phylum: Platyhelminthes
- Class: Trematoda
- Order: Plagiorchiida
- Family: Heterophyidae
- Genus: Galactosomum; Looss, 1899

Genus of flukes

Galactosomum is a genus of flukes in the family Heterophyidae. There are currently 28 recognised species within the genus. They mainly infect aquatic birds, but often infest fish as larvae. Three species are known to use marine mammals as hosts.

== Description ==
The excised spherical metacercaria is 2.7–4.9 mm long. Generally, only one is found per fish.

== Life cycle ==
Some species of Galactosomum cause infected fish to swim closer to the surface and colorfully flash their underbellies. In fish, symptoms can be similar to those of whirling disease caused by the unrelated parasite Myxobolus cerebralis. Gastropods hosting select species suffer from sensory impairment due to infestation. This makes these prey animals more likely to be consumed by aquatic birds, providing a host for the parasite to reach the mature stage of its life cycle. Galactosomum cannot survive in human hosts.

== Species ==
- Galactosomum baylisi (Gohar, 1930)
- Galactosomum bearupi Pearson, 1973
- Galactosomum cochlear (Diesing, 1850) Travassos, 1929
- Galactosomum cochleariforme (Rudolphi, 1819) Pratt, 1911
- Galactosomum darbyi Price, 1934
- Galactosomum dollfusi Pearson, 1973
- Galactosomum echinatum (Timon-David, 1955)
- Galactosomum erinaceum (Poirier, 1886)
- Galactosomum fregatae (Prudhoe, 1949)
- Galactosomum humbargari Park, 1936
- Galactosomum johnsoni (Price, 1934)
- Galactosomum lacteum (Jägerskiöld, 1896)
- Galactosomum linguiforme Anantaraman, 1974
- Galactosomum nicolai (Isaichikov, 1927)
- Galactosomum palawanense Fischthal & Kuntz, 1972
- Galactosomum phalacrocoracis Yamaguti, 1939
- Galactosomum puffini Yamaguti, 1941
- Galactosomum renincola Pearson, 1973
- Galactosomum sanaense Kobayashi, 1942
- Galactosomum semifuscum (Olsson, 1876)
- Galactosomum sinuilactis Pearson, 1973
- Galactosomum spinetum (Braun, 1901)
- Galactosomum stelleri Dailey, Demaree & Critchfield, 2002
- Galactosomum timondavidi Pearson & Prévot, 1971
- Galactosomum ubelakeri (Dailey, 1969) Pearson, 1977
- Galactosomum ussuriense Oshmarin, 1963
- Galactosomum witenbergi Anantaraman, 1974
- Galactosomum yehi (Dissanaike, 1961) Pearson, 1973
