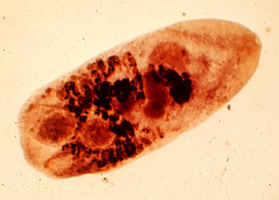
- Metagonimus yokogawai

Scientific classification
- Kingdom: Animalia
- Phylum: Platyhelminthes
- Class: Trematoda
- Order: Plagiorchiida
- Family: Heterophyidae
- Genus: Metagonimus; Katsurada, 1913

Diversity
- 8 species

= Metagonimus =

Genus of flukes

Metagonimus is a genus of trematodes, or fluke worms, in the family Heterophyidae.

It is a parasite causing metagonimiasis.

== Species ==
There are 8 species within the genus Metagonimus include:

- Metagonimus hakubaensis Shimazu, 1999
- Metagonimus katsuradai Izumi, 1935
- Metagonimus minutus
- Metagonimus miyatai Saito, Chai, Kim, Lee and Rim, 1997
- Metagonimus otsurui Saito & Hori, 1962
- Metagonimus ovatus
- Metagonimus takahashii Takahashi, 1929
- Metagonimus yokogawai (Katsurada, 1912)
