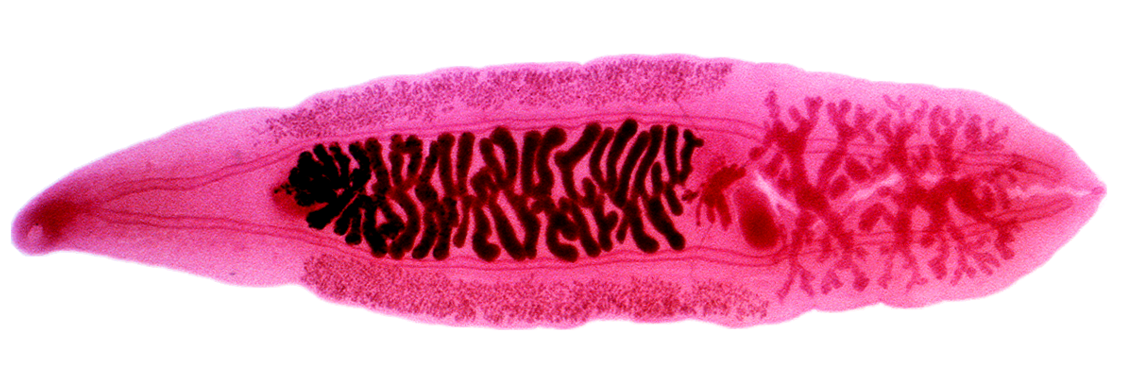

Scientific classification
- Domain: Eukaryota
- Kingdom: Animalia
- Phylum: Platyhelminthes
- Class: Trematoda
- Order: Plagiorchiida
- Suborder: Opisthorchiata; La Rue, 1957

= Opisthorchiata =

Suborder of flukes

Opisthorchiata is a suborder of flatworms in the subclass Digenea.

== Families ==
- Superfamily Opisthorchioidea Braun, 1901
  - Cryptogonimidae Ward, 1917
  - Heterophyidae Leiper, 1909
  - Opisthorchiidae Looss, 1899
