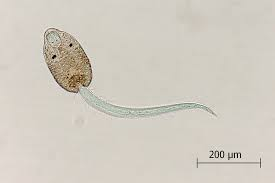

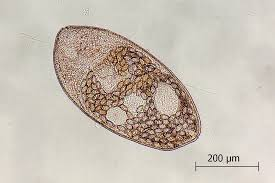

Scientific classification
- Kingdom: Animalia
- Phylum: Platyhelminthes
- Class: Trematoda
- Order: Plagiorchiida
- Family: Heterophyidae
- Genus: Haplorchis
- Species: H. pumilio

Binomial name
- Haplorchis pumilio (Loos, 1899)

= Haplorchis pumilio =

Species of fluke

Haplorchis pumilio is a species of parasitic flatworm, or fluke, which has recently been found to infect humans. It was first described by Arthur Loos in 1896 from a bird in Egypt and included in the genus Haplorchis in 1899. It's considered an emerging disease due to its new introduction to the Americas and its zoonotic abilities which give it potential for spread that could lead to localized outbreaks. It infects snails, fish, birds, humans, and select other mammals and is characterized by a unique sterile soldier caste that works to defend the host from other parasites.

== Geographic distribution and epidemiology ==
Haplorchis pumilio was originally found in Africa and southern Asia. It has since been further spread to the Americas and Australia, most likely through aquarium trade and imports of mollusks and fish that are infected. So far, there have not been any recorded cases of people being infected by this in the Americas. However there have been reported cases in 5 countries in Africa and Asia: Egypt, Laos, China, Thailand, and Vietnam; including a recent study in Tanzania that found 19 children out of 1,440 were infected with the flukes. Additionally, another study in Laos found that 4.4% of people sampled had trematode eggs including H. pumilio. The parasite's ability to infect economically important fish, especially those commonly consumed in the affected regions, such as the Nile tilapia in Africa, could lead to low-grade endemics of H. pumilio infections.

== Life cycle and hosts ==
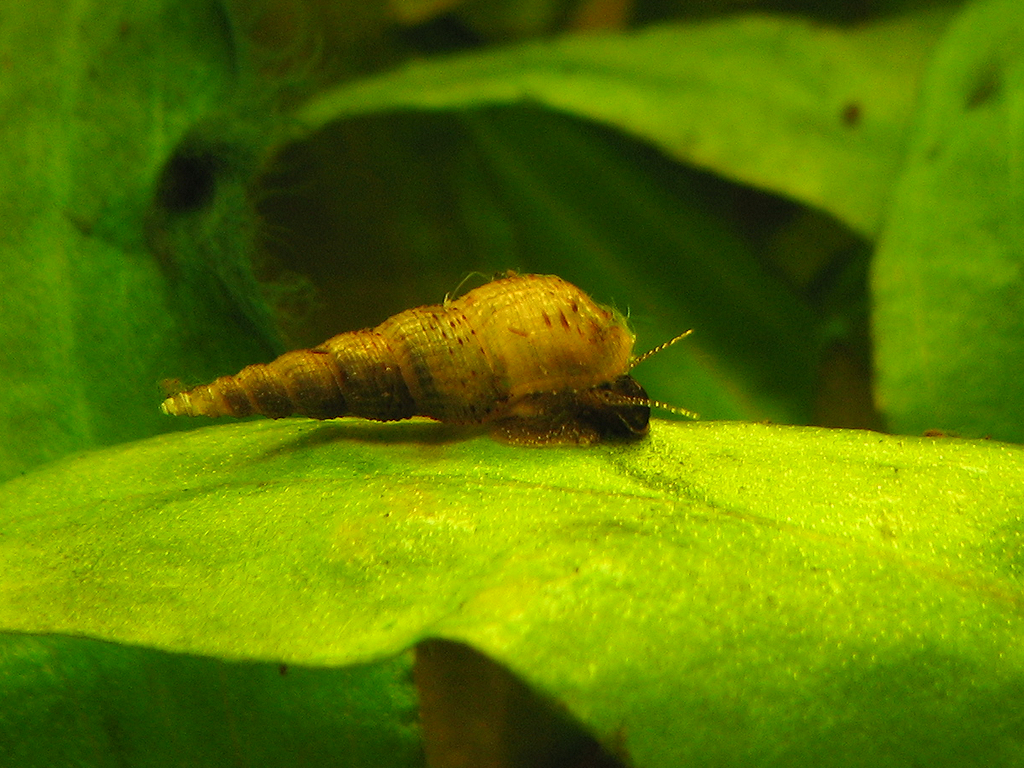
Red-rimmed melania or Malaysian trumpet snail (Melanoides tuberculatus)

Haplorchis pumilio has a complex life cycle of adults, eggs, miracidia, rediae, cercariae, and metacercariae with alternation of parthenogenic and hermaphroditic generations. Thiarid snails (Thiaridae) are the first intermediate host of H. pumilio and are infected when they siphon feces containing eggs shed by the definitive host. The Malaysian trumpet snail also known as the red-rimmed melania (Melanoides tuberculata), which is an invasive species in the Americas native to Africa and southern Asia, is a major carrier of these. The eggs hatch and mature through miracidia and rediae generations into cercariae that will clone itself through asexual reproduction to take over the gastropod host. The reproductively viable cercariae will leave the snail and search for their second intermediate host, fish. Recently it has been discovered that H. pumilio can create a soldier caste dedicated to guarding their host territory. These soldiers are sterile and instead dedicate their body mass to having mouthparts 5 times larger than the normal flukes. They use this to kill heterospecific trematodes by attaching to them and swallowing their innards. In fish, cercariae penetrate and imbed in the gills and caudal muscles of fish and encyst into metacercaria, which can take up to 15 days. Fish heavily infested with these show erratic movements and bleeding from penetration sites that result in mortalities. Once infected fish are consumed by definitive hosts, birds and some mammals, adult flukes will develop in the intestines. Birds are the preferred host in the wild, but H. pumilio is opportunistic and will also infect humans through ingestion of mollusks, fish, and other mammals. Adult parasites are about 500 μm in length by 200 μm in width with a subterminal oral sucker, muscular pharynx, a complex ventral sucker with a ring of spines, an elongated esophagus, and two caeca. These adult flukes are hermaphroditic and will reproduce sexually to produce eggs that will be shed in the feces.

== Impact on wildlife ==
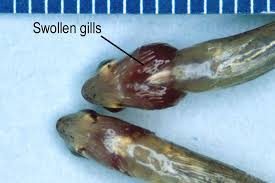
Swollen gills from H. pumilio infection

Haplorchis pumilio turns its snail host M. tuberculata into what is considered a factory-fortress. Cercariae will first castrate it and then infest the snail with clones. Studies have shown that the parasites cause the snail to grow a thicker shell and larger body mass than normal, therefore stealing its body and fortifying it to lessen the chance for predation. This gigantism is presumed to happen because the snail's energy is no longer put towards reproduction. H. pumilio can infect and encyst into the soft tissues of a wide range of freshwater fish. This can result in hemorrhaging in the skeletal muscle, erratic swimming, and when overwhelmed with high parasite volume, death. These complications can also increase the chances of predation due to impairment and abnormal behavior. The parasite is impacting several threatened and endangered species in the United States, such as the fountain darter (Etheostoma fonticola). These already vulnerable populations now have the added stressor of a parasite which amplifies morbidity and mortality. Because it is highly invasive, adaptable, and difficult to control, H. pumilio is also increasingly impacting aquaculture by causing economic losses in fish species such as carp, tilapia, pacu, and catfish. The effects on birds and mammals besides humans is relativity unknown, however could be assumed that in heavy parasite loads they may experience negative health effects. Overall, it is considered to have a negative impact on biodiversity, fisheries, and native fauna.

== Signs of disease and treatment ==
There were an estimated 90 million people infected with food-borne trematodes worldwide in 2024, and while Haplorchis pumilio cases in humans remain low and isolated to Africa and Asia, they are a growing public health concern. Infection by H. pumilio causes haplorchiasis, a form of trematodiasis which is among the highest ranked Neglected Tropical Diseases in Asia. Clinical descriptions are limited due to a lack of research on the subject, however, they are similar to the infections caused by other flukes in the Heterophyidae family. Some people infected with the flukes will be asymptomatic and experience no symptoms. diarrhea, nausea, fatigue, and malaise are the most frequently reported signs. Abdominal pain can occur in some more chronic or heavier infections as well as unintentional weight loss. More severe infections can cause constipation, hunger pains, and bloody diarrhea. As the infection intensifies it can cause a distended abdomen, anorexia, and toxic and allergic reactions from absorption of worm metabolites. If left untreated some cases can lead to critical gastrointestinal issues. Treatment for the parasite is Praziquantel followed by checking the stool 30–60 days post treatment for clearance of H. pumilio eggs.

== Management efforts ==
In aquaculture, control of the invasive snail and restricting reservoir hosts such as waterfowl can mitigate outbreaks of H. pumilio in fish populations. Improving farm hygiene such as waste management can also control contamination. In the environment, it is much more difficult because M. tuberculata is highly invasive. Aquarium dumping in water sources allows the snail to continue appearing in new areas, and the vast diversity of fishes that can get infected allows the parasite more opportunities to continue its growth cycle and infect more definitive hosts (birds, humans, and other mammals). Birds can also transport parasite eggs to new areas, negating the water barrier when feces from an infected bird end up in a previously H. pumilio free body of water. The best form of control in the environment is stopping aquarium dumping and other forms of introduction of M. tuberculata which is the primary spreader of the parasite. This also includes properly cleaning boats and equipment after use in freshwater and not using M. tuberculata as a control for other gastropods. Once introduced to a source, it's almost impossible to contain the snail and the parasite that comes along with it. In humans, freezing fish for at least 24 hours at -20 Celsius or properly cooking it at least 60 Celsius for 15 minutes will eliminate parasites. Consumption of raw or undercooked fish leads to infection, educating communities on this could help reduce infections. Especially those that traditionally eat raw fish such as ceviche in Latin America.

== Future directions and research ==
Future research should investigate areas of limited knowledge in the distribution, impacts, and identification of Haplorchis pumilio. While there is some information on the impact on fish, it is limited and there is little to no research that has been done on impacts to birds and other non-human animals. How to control the invasive M. tuberculata as it continues to spread is critical for preventing further infection of the flukes to other regions and endangered species. More detailed morphological and molecular studies to identify different life stages will help speed up, refine, and improve the accuracy of testing procedures for H. pumilio. Further testing should be done in Asia and Africa for human infections, as studies indicate that more people than suggested could be infected. This can also help identify signs and symptoms of the emerging parasitic disease and the best form of treatment, especially in severe cases.
