= Cryptogonimidae =

Scientific classification
- Kingdom: Animalia
- Phylum: Platyhelminthes
- Class: Trematoda
- Order: Plagiorchiida
- Suborder: Opisthorchiata
- Superfamily: Opisthorchioidea
- Family: Cryptogonimidae; Ward, 1917

Synonyms
- Acanthocollaritrematidae Travassos, Freitas & Bürnheim, 1965; Acanthostomidae Poche, 1926

Family of flukes

Cryptogonimidae is a family of trematodes belonging to the order Plagiorchiida.

== Genera ==
Species of Cryptogonimidae are grouped into the following genera:

- Acanthocollaritrema Travassos, Freitas & Bührnheim, 1965
- Acanthosiphodera Madhavi, 1976
- Acanthostomoides Szidat, 1956
- Acanthostomum Looss, 1899
- Adlardia Miller, Bray, Goiran, Justine & Cribb, 2009
- Allometadena Madhavii, 1976
- Anisocladium Looss, 1902
- Anisocoelium Lühe, 1900
- Anoiktostoma Stossich, 1899
- Aphalloides Dollfus, Chabaud & Golvan, 1957
- Aphallus Poche, 1926
- Beluesca Miller & Crib, 2007
- Biovarium Yamaguti, 1934
- Brientrema Dollfus, 1950
- Caimanicola Freitas & Lent, 1938
- Caulanus Miller & Crib, 2007
- Centrovarium Stafford, 1904
- Chelediadema Miller & Crib, 2007
- Cicesetrema Pérez-Ponce de León, Castillo-Sanchez & Rosales-Casian, 1999
- Claribulla Overstreet, 1969
- Cryptogonimus Osborn, 1903
- Diplopharyngotrema Yamaguti, 1958
- Euryakaina Miller, Adlard, Bray, Justine & Cribb, 2010
- Exorchis Kobayashi, 1921
- Gonacanthella Sogandares-Bernal, 1959
- Gymnatrema Morozov, 1955
- Gynichthys Miller & Crib, 2009
- Isocoelioides Zhukov, 1971
- Isocoelium Ozaki, 1927
- Latuterus Miller & Crib, 2007
- Lobosorchis Miller & Crib, 2005
- Mehrailla Srivastava, 1939
- Mehravermis Machida, 2009
- Neometadena Hafeezullah & Siddiqi, 1970
- Novemtestis Yamaguti, 1942
- Opistognathotrema Machida, 2009
- Orientodiploproctodaeum Bhutta & Khan, 1970
- Paraisocoelium Ozaki, 1932
- Perlevilobus Miller & Crib, 2008
- Polycryptocylix Lamothe-Argumedo, 1970
- Polyorchitrema Srivastava, 1939
- Proctocaecum Baugh, 1957
- Pseudoacanthostomum Caballero, Bravo-Hollis & Grocott, 1953
- Pseudocryptogonimus Yamaguti, 1958
- Pseudometadena Yamaguti, 1952
- Retrobulla Crib, 1985
- Retrovarium Miller & Crib, 2007
- Siphodera Linton, 1910
- Siphoderina Manter, 1934
- Siphomutabilus Miller & Crib, 2013
- Stegopa Linton, 1910
- Stemmatostoma Crib, 1986
- Tandemorchis Lü, 1993
- Telogaster Macfarlane, 1945
- Timoniella Rebecq, 1960
- Varialvus Miller, Bray, Justine & Crib, 2010
