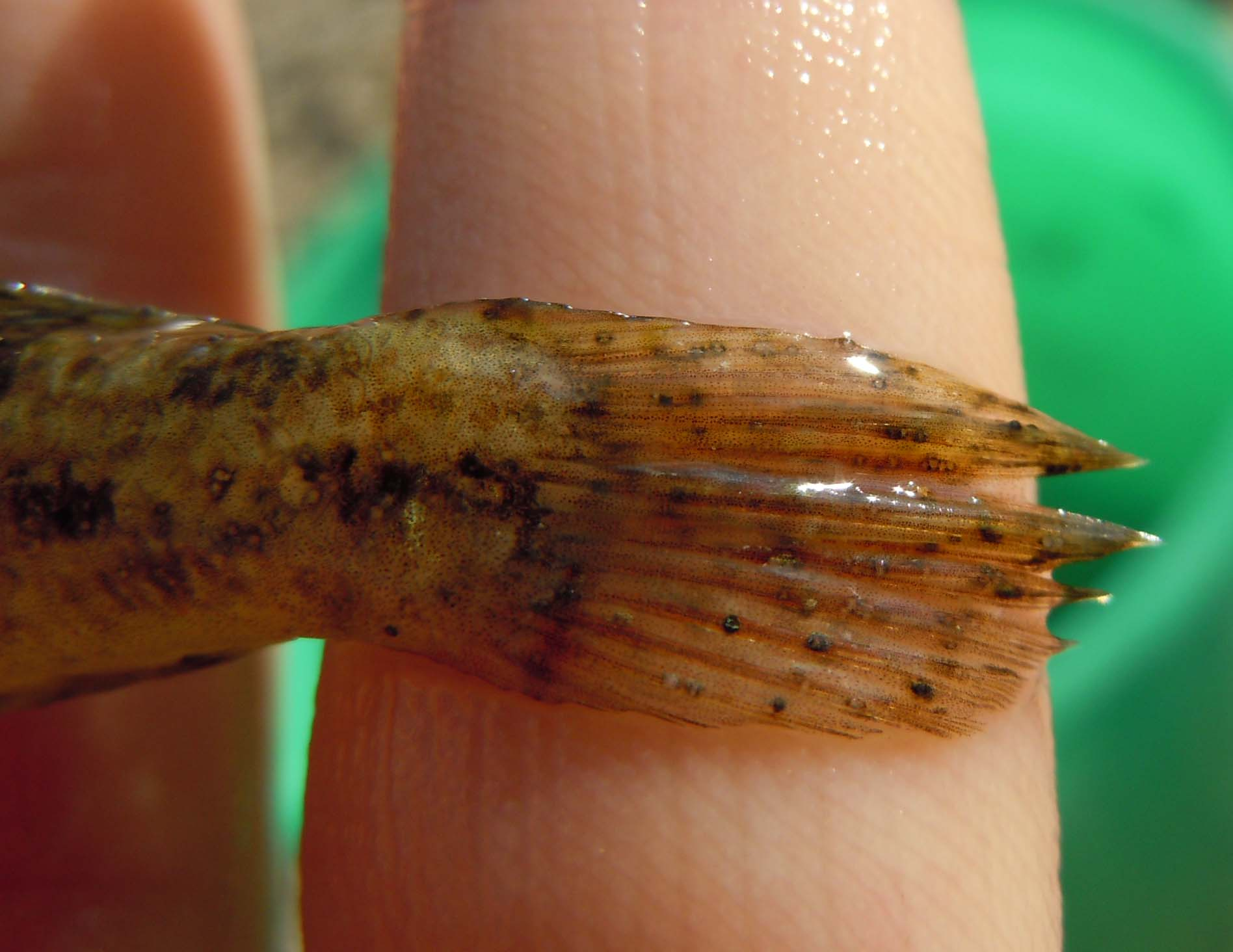
- The metacercariae, encysted in the fins of the round goby

Scientific classification
- Kingdom: Animalia
- Phylum: Platyhelminthes
- Class: Trematoda
- Order: Plagiorchiida
- Family: Heterophyidae
- Genus: Cryptocotyle; Lühe, 1899

Synonyms
- Tocotrema Looss, 1899

= Cryptocotyle =

Genus of flukes

Cryptocotyle is a genus of trematodes from the family Heterophyidae. The definitive hosts of the parasites are fish-eating birds and mammals. The metacercariae are visible in the skin of infected fish as "black spots".

== Species ==
- Cryptocotyle americana Ciurea, 1924
- Cryptocotyle badamshini (Kurochkin, 1959)
- Cryptocotyle concava (Creplin, 1825)
- Cryptocotyle cryptocotyloides (Issaitschikow, 1923)
- Cryptocotyle delamurei (Jurachno, 1987)
- Cryptocotyle jejuna (Nicoll, 1907)
- Cryptocotyle lingua (Creplin, 1825)
- Cryptocotyle macrorhinis (MacCallum, 1916)
