= Stellantchasmus =

Scientific classification
- Domain: Eukaryota
- Kingdom: Animalia
- Phylum: Platyhelminthes
- Class: Trematoda
- Order: Plagiorchiida
- Family: Heterophyidae
- Genus: Stellantchasmus; Onji & Nishio, 1916

Genus of flukes

Stellantchasmus is a genus of trematodes in the family Heterophyidae.

== Species ==
- Stellantchasmus aspinosus Pearson, 1964
- Stellantchasmus falcatus Onji & Nishio, 1916
- Stellantchasmus gallinae (Oshmarin, 1971) Pearson & Ow-Yang, 1982
