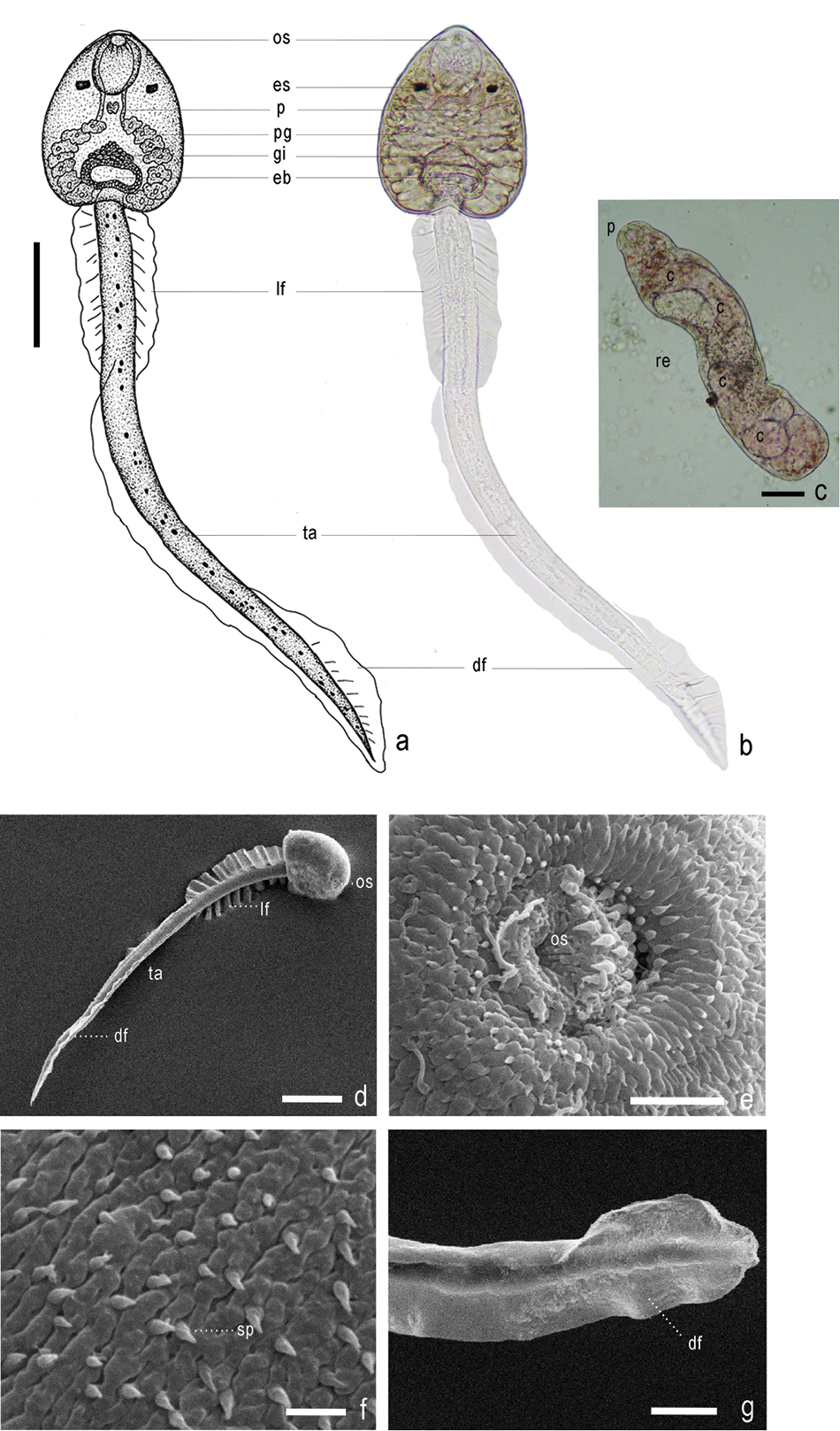
- Haplorchis taichui

Scientific classification
- Kingdom: Animalia
- Phylum: Platyhelminthes
- Class: Trematoda
- Order: Plagiorchiida
- Family: Heterophyidae
- Genus: Haplorchis; Looss, 1899

= Haplorchis =

Genus of worms

Haplorchis is a genus of intestinal flukes in the family Heterophyidae.

Species include:

- Haplorchis popelkae
- Haplorchis pumilio
- Haplorchis taichui
- Haplorchis vagabundi
- Haplorchis yokogawai

== Life history and host selection ==
Similar to other digenean trematodes, H. pumilio has a complex life cycle involving a vertebrate final host and two intermediate hosts. As a first intermediate host, H. pumilio tends to infect and live in the largest (and probably oldest) Melanoides tuberculata snails. This preference helps it defend against usurpation by other trematodes.

The infection of a host starts with just one fluke, which then establishes a colony of dozens to thousands of clones that work together to take over the host.

Haplorchis pumilio infection causes its snail host to grow a thicker shell and gain a larger body mass than uninfected snails of the same shell length. This is in line with the parasite’s strategy of strengthening and protecting its “factory-fortress” in the host snail. By investing resources into maintaining and protecting its host, H. pumilio reduces the risk of being displaced by competing trematodes.

H. pumilio shows a "caste-based sociality" with a caste of specialized sterile soldiers.

== Soldier class ==
A class of sterile soldiers is created to prevent takeover by competitor trematode species. In H. pumilio, these soldiers are the most physically specialized caste of trematode yet documented.

Soldiers are smaller, more mobile, and develop along a different pathway than sexually mature reproductives. One big difference is their mouthparts (pharynx), which are five times as big as those of the reproductives. They make up nearly a quarter of the volume of the soldier. These soldiers don’t have a germinal mass, can’t metamorphose to be reproductive, and are therefore obligately sterile.

Soldiers are readily distinguished from the immature and mature reproductive worms. Soldiers are more aggressive than reproductives, attacking heterospecific trematodes that infect their host in vitro. Interestingly, H. pumilio soldiers do not attack conspecifics from other colonies.

The soldiers are not evenly distributed throughout the host body. They’re found in the highest numbers in the basal visceral mass, where competing trematodes tend to multiply during the early phase of infection. This strategic positioning allows them to effectively defend against invaders, similar to how soldier distribution patterns are seen in other animals with defensive castes.

They "appear to be an obligately sterile physical caste, akin to that of the most advanced social insects".
