= Metagonimus takahashii =

Scientific classification
- Domain: Eukaryota
- Kingdom: Animalia
- Phylum: Platyhelminthes
- Class: Trematoda
- Order: Plagiorchiida
- Family: Heterophyidae
- Genus: Metagonimus
- Species: M. takahashii

Binomial name
- Metagonimus takahashii Takahashi, 1929

Species of fluke

Metagonimus takahashii is a species of a trematode, or fluke worm, in the family Heterophyidae.

It is a human parasite causing metagonimiasis.

== Distribution ==
This species occurs in Japan and Korea.

== Life cycle ==
The first intermediate hosts of Metagonimus takahashii include freshwater snails Semisulcospira coreana and Koreanomelania nodifila.

The second intermediate host include freshwater fish: crucian carp Carassius carassius, common carp Cyprinus carpio, and Tribolodon brandtii.

Natural definitive hosts are humans. Experimental definitive hosts are: mice, and dogs.
