= Acanthotrema (flatworm) =

Scientific classification
- Kingdom: Animalia
- Phylum: Platyhelminthes
- Class: Trematoda
- Order: Plagiorchiida
- Family: Heterophyidae
- Genus: Acanthotrema; Travassos, 1928

Genus of flukes

Acanthotrema is a genus of trematodes in the family Heterophyidae.

== Species ==
- Acanthotrema armatum Lafuente, Roca & Carbonell, 2000
- Acanthotrema cursitans (Holliman, 1961) [emend. Kinsella & Heard, 1973] Sohn, Han & Chai, 2003
- Acanthotrema felis Sohn, Han & Chai, 2003
- Acanthotrema hancocki (Martin, 1950) Lafuente, Roca & Carbonell, 2000
- Acanthotrema martini (Sogandares-Bernal, 1959) Lafuente, Roca & Carbonell, 2000
- Acanthotrema tanayense (Velasquez, 1973) Sohn, Han & Chai, 2003
- Acanthotrema tridactyla (Martin & Kuntz, 1955) Sohn, Han & Chai, 2003
