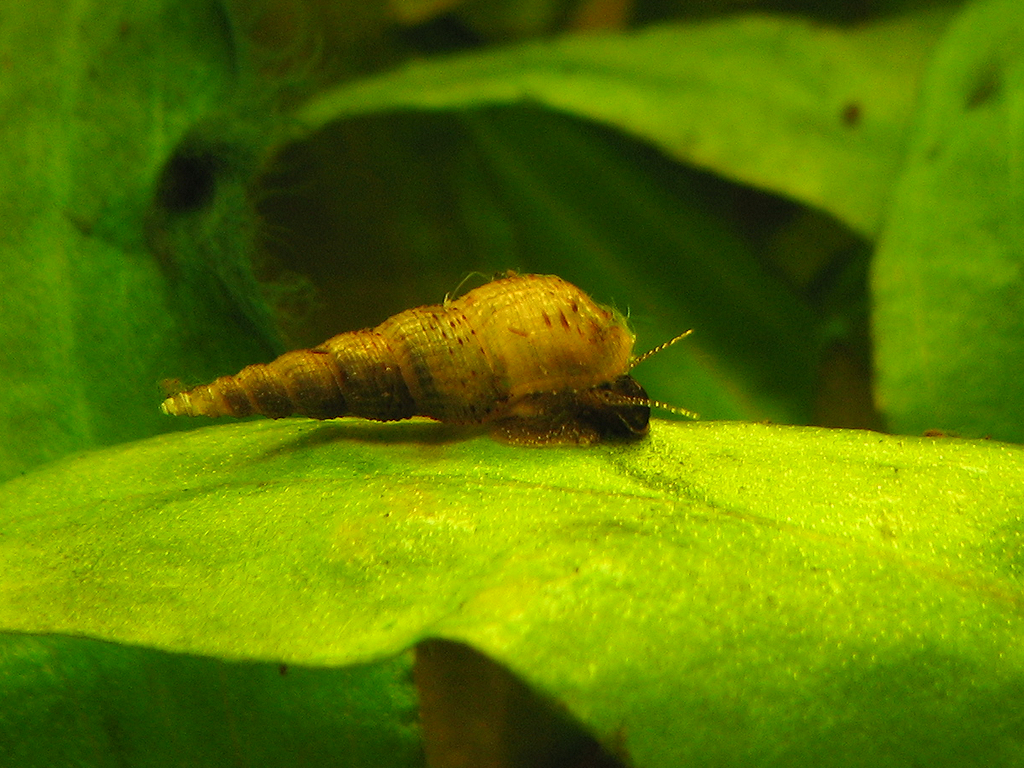

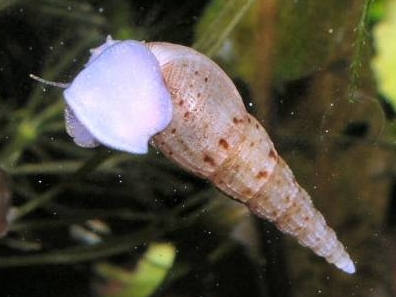

Conservation status
- Least Concern (IUCN 3.1)

- Secure (NatureServe)

Scientific classification
- Kingdom: Animalia
- Phylum: Mollusca
- Class: Gastropoda
- Subclass: Caenogastropoda
- Order: incertae sedis
- Family: Thiaridae
- Genus: Melanoides
- Species: M. tuberculata

Binomial name
- Melanoides tuberculata (O. F. Müller, 1774)

Synonyms
- See list

= Red-rimmed melania =

Species of gastropod

The red-rimmed melania (Melanoides tuberculata), also known as the Malayan livebearing snail or Malayan/Malaysian trumpet snail (often abbreviated to MTS by aquarists), is a species of freshwater snail with an operculum, a parthenogenetic, aquatic gastropod mollusk in the family Thiaridae.

The common name comes from the presence of reddish spots on their otherwise greenish-brown shells.

The species name is sometimes spelled M. tuberculatus, but this is incorrect because Melanoides Olivier, 1804 was clearly intended to be feminine because it was combined with the feminine specific epithet fasciolata in the original description.

This species is native to northern Africa and southern Asia, but it has been accidentally introduced in many other tropical and subtropical areas worldwide. It has also been accidentally introduced to heated aquaria in colder parts of the world.

== Subspecies ==
- † M. t. dadiana (Oppenheim, 1919)
- † M. t. monolithica (Bukowski, 1892)
- † M. t. tegalensis (Oostingh, 1935)
- M. t. tuberculata (O. F. Müller, 1774)

== Shell description ==
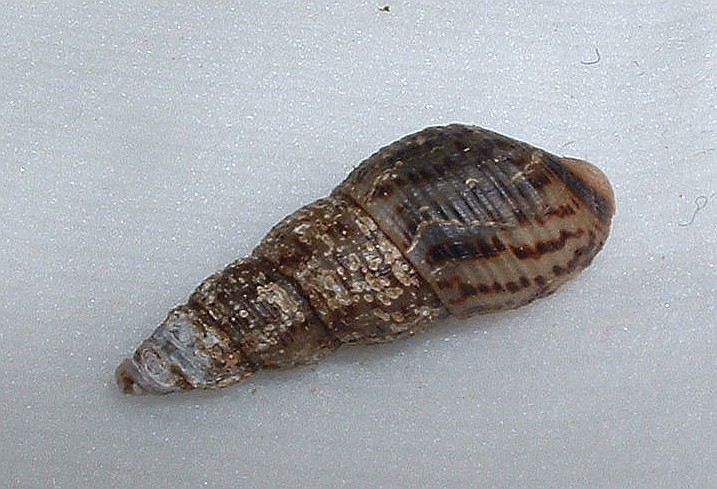
Red-rimmed melania shell, with the characteristic red spots and streaks apparent:. Specimen length is about 20 millimetres (3/4 in).

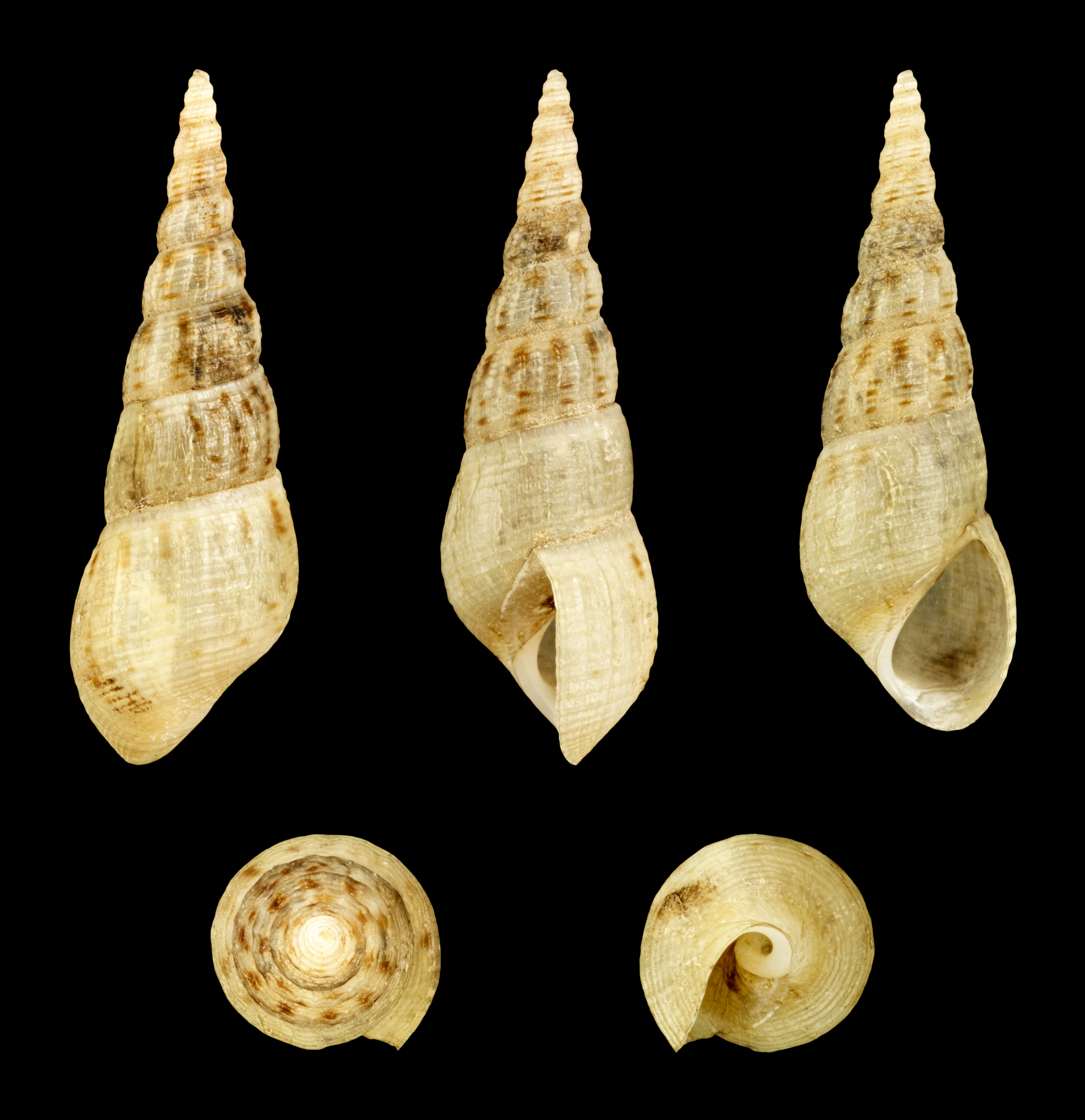
Melanoides tuberculata

This species has an elongated, conical shell, which is usually light brown, marked with rust-colored spots. An operculum is present. In some places, such as in Israel, the shells are colored in black or dark brown, probably to help conceal the snail on the background of the basalt rocks of the Sea of Galilee (Kinnereth).

The average shell length is about 20–27 millimetres (3/4–1 1/8 in) or 30–36 millimetres (1 1/8–1 3/8 in), but exceptional specimens may be up to 80 millimetres (3 1/8 in) long. Shells of this species have 10–15 whorls.

== Distribution ==
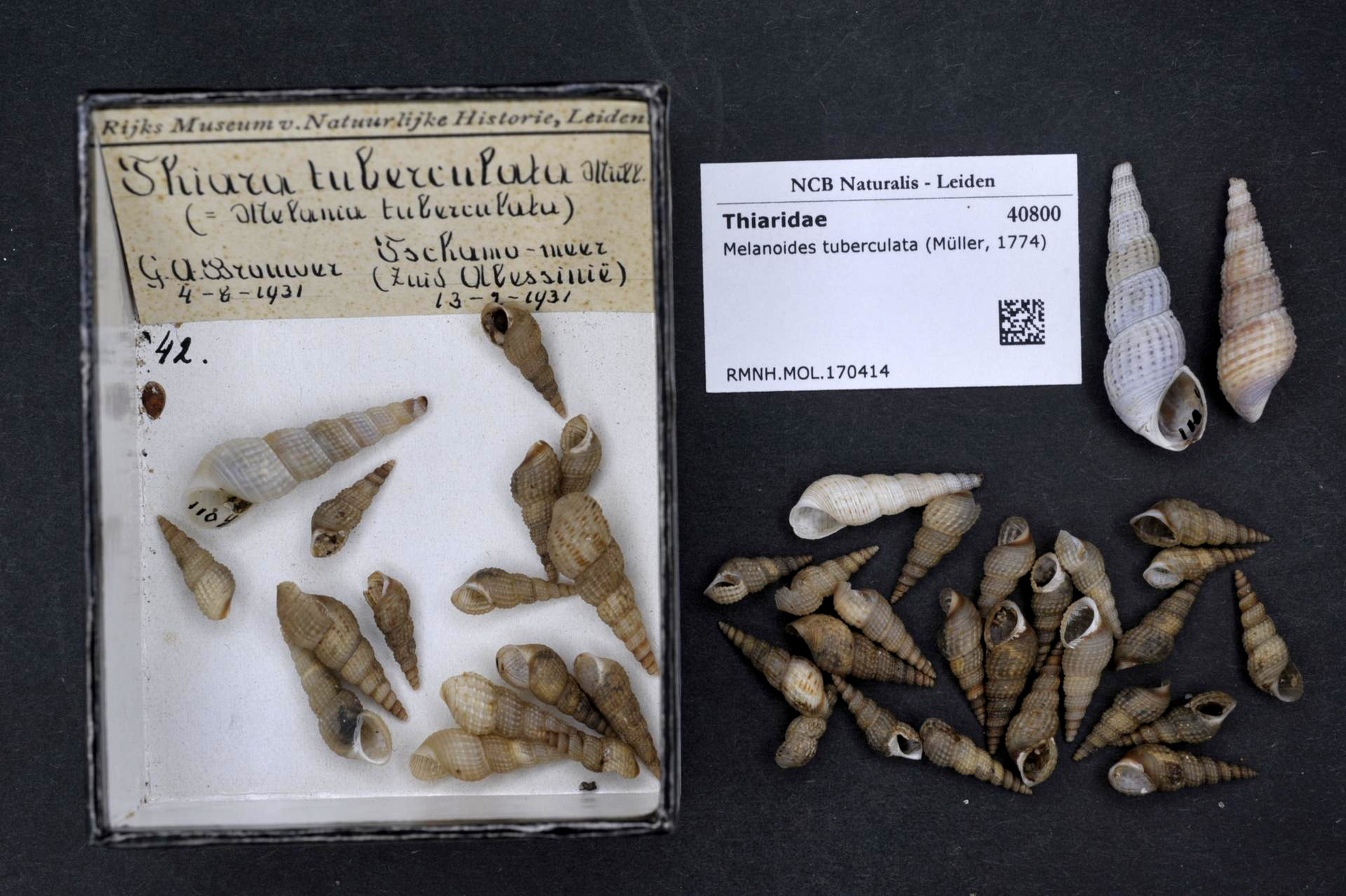
Variety of M. tuberculata shells: Some of them are dark brown or nearly black.

This species is speculated to be native to subtropical and tropical Africa (excluding West Africa), Indo-Pacific region, and South Asia, as well as the Arabian Peninsula, or to northern Africa and southern Asia.

In Africa

- Algeria, Burundi, The Democratic Republic of the Congo, Egypt, Eritrea, Ethiopia, Kenya, Libya, Malawi, Morocco, Mozambique, Namibia, Niger,
- South Africa (Eastern Cape Province, Free State, Gauteng, KwaZulu-Natal, Limpopo Province)
- Botswana, Eswatini, Senegal, Sudan, Tanzania, Tunisia, Zimbabwe.

In Asia

- Bangladesh, Cambodia, China, India (including Andaman Islands), Israel, Japan, Taiwan, Laos, Malaysia (Peninsular Malaysia), Nepal, Saudi Arabia, Sri Lanka, Vietnam
- Thailand

Prehistoric localities include Gobero in Niger in 6200–5200 BCE.

=== Nonindigenous distribution ===
- Cuba
- United States since the 1930s (see below)
- Latin America in the late 1960s
- Brazil – since 1967 (Ilha Grande in Rio de Janeiro in southeastern Brazil since 2004)
- Netherlands – before 1990
- New Zealand
- Venezuela
- Dominica
- Trinidad
- and others

This species can also be found in artificially heated, indoor habitats, such as aquaria, in greenhouses, and similar biotopes:

- Czech Republic
- Germany
- Great Britain
- Slovakia – thermal brook in the wild
- Greece before 2026

=== Nonindigenous distribution in the United States ===
This species has become established outside of its natural range in large part through the activities of aquarists. These snails were imported to the United States by the aquarium trade as early as the 1930s. Established populations exist from Florida to Texas, and the species may still be expanding its range in the West and Northeast. Some of these exotic populations have become very large, with densities of 10,000 per square metre (930/sq ft) being reported from the St. Johns River in Florida. In some cases red-rimmed melanias are believed to have a negative impact on native snail populations.

The nonindigenous distribution includes the United States: Arizona; San Francisco Bay, California; Colorado; Florida; Hawaiʻi; Louisiana; Montana; North Carolina; Nevada; Oregon; Utah; Texas, and Fall River County in South Dakota, (unconfirmed in Virginia, and Wyoming.)

== Ecology ==
This is primarily a burrowing species that tends to be most active at night.

=== Habitat ===
Although normally a freshwater snail, this species is very tolerant of brackish water, and has been recorded in waters with a salinity of 32.5 ppt (1,024 specific gravity salinity).

It is, though, a warm-climate species. It appears to prefer a temperature range of 18 to 25 °C (64 to 77 °F) or 18 to 32 °C (64 to 90 °F). Research has been conducted to determine the snail's lethal high water temperature, which is about 50 °C (122 °F). This information is helpful in the disinfection of fishing gear and research equipment, which otherwise may inadvertently spread the snails to uninfested waters.

This species is resistant to low oxygen levels. Its pollution tolerance value is 3 (on scale 0–10; 0 is the best water quality, 10 is the worst water quality).

=== Feeding habits ===
This snail feeds primarily on algae (microalgae) and detritus.

=== Lifecycle ===
Red-rimmed melania females are both parthenogenic and ovoviviparous. Females can be recognized by their greenish-coloured gonads, while males have reddish gonads. The males are rare, making up for 10 to 33% of population. Under good conditions, females produce fertilised eggs that are transferred to a brood pouch, where they remain until they hatch (parthenogenesis and viviparity). Melanoides tuberculata has 1–64 embryos in its brood pouch. Snails will begin reproducing at a size as small as 5 millimetres (1/4 in) or 10 millimetres (3/8 in) in length and broods may contain over 70 offspring (iteroparity). The size of the shell of the parent at peak release of juveniles is 20.0 millimetres (3/4 in). The size of juveniles at birth is 1.2–2.2 millimetres (3/64–11/128 in).

Melanoides tuberculata grows to a similar size as Tarebia granifera, and is similar in size at first birth and juvenile output.

It is a r-strategist species.

=== Parasites ===
Melanoides tuberculata is known to carry certain parasites, which can be dangerous to humans. Pinto & de Melo (2011) compiled a checklist of 37 species of trematode parasites from this species of snail. Eleven of those trematodes are also parasites of human. These snails serve as first intermediate host for parasites which include:

- Clonorchis sinensis – Chinese liver fluke
- Centrocestus formosanus
- Paragonimus westermani – Oriental lung fluke
- Paragonimus kellicotti
- Angiostrongylus cantonensis
- Loxogenoides bicolor
- Transversotrema laruei
- Sticiodora tridactyl
- Gastrodiscus aegyptiacus
- Philophthalmus gralli
- Philophthalmus distomatosa
- Haplorchis pumilio
- Haplorchis sp.
- Metagonimus
- Diorchitrema formosanum
- unknown species in Schistosomatidae

This species is a host for a trematode parasite that has been found to infect an endangered species of fish in Texas, the fountain darter.

== Agricultural pests ==
Red-rimmed melania can sometimes be an agricultural pest species, as has been reported on Chinese cabbage plantations in Hong Kong.

== Aquaria ==
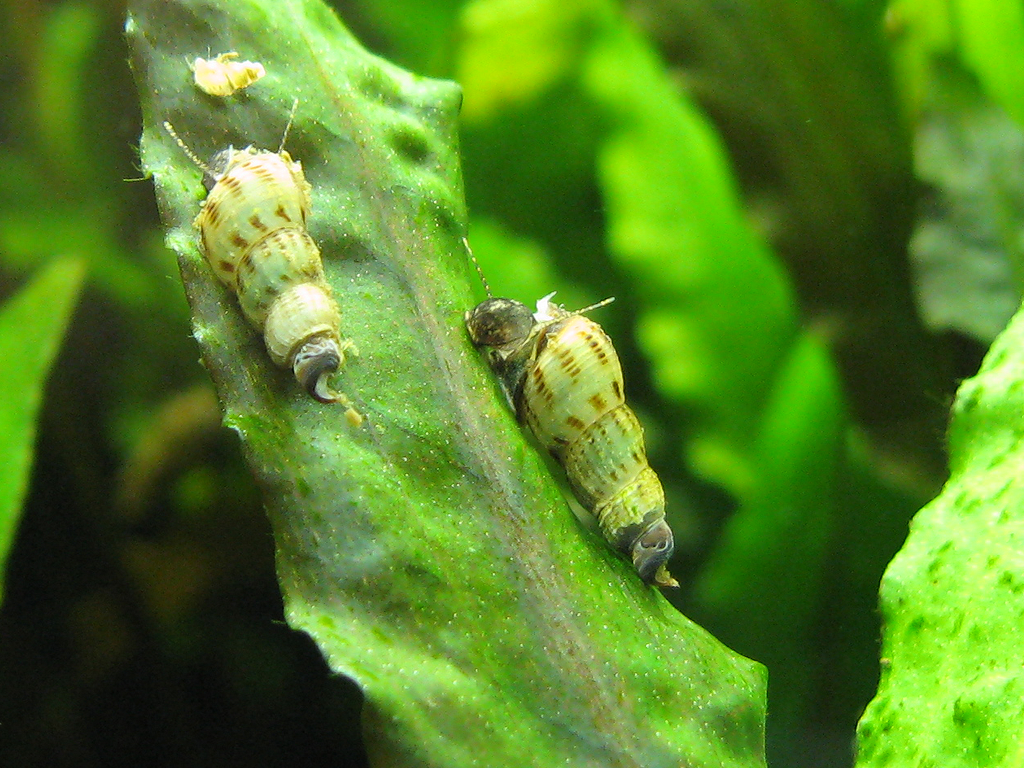
Two red-rimmed melania with eroded shells

Red-rimmed melania are quite commonly found in freshwater aquaria, but opinion in the hobby is divided between those who see them as a pest species and those who value their usefulness as algae eaters and substrate cleaners.

== Synonyms ==
- Malanoides tuberculata [sic] misspelling
- Melania (Melanoides) tuberculata (O. F. Müller, 1774) · alternate representation
- Melania (Stenomelania) rustica Mousson, 1857 junior subjective synonym
- Melania (Striatella) tuberculata (O. F. Müller, 1774) · alternate representation
- Melania (Striatella) tuberculata var. flavida G. Nevill, 1885 junior subjective synonym
- Melania (Striatella) tuberculata var. luteomarginata G. Nevill, 1885 junior subjective synonym
- † Melania (Striatella) woodwardi K. Martin, 1905 junior subjective synonym
- Melania baldwini Ancey, 1899 junior subjective synonym
- Melania beryllina Brot, 1860 junior subjective synonym
- Melania cancellata Say, 1829 junior subjective synonym
- Melania commersoni Morelet, 1860 junior subjective synonym
- † Melania distinguenda Brot, 1876 junior subjective synonym
- Melania dominula Tapparone Canefri, 1883 junior subjective synonym
- Melania exusta Reeve, 1859 junior subjective synonym
- Melania flammigera Dunker, 1844 junior subjective synonym
- Melania floricoma Reeve, 1859 junior subjective synonym
- Melania flyensis Tapparone Canefri, 1883 junior subjective synonym
- Melania gracilina A. Gould, 1859 junior subjective synonym
- Melania inhambanica E. von Martens, 1860 junior subjective synonym
- Melania javanica Brot, 1877 junior subjective synonym
- Melania judaica J. R. Roth, 1855 junior subjective synonym
- Melania layardi Dohrn, 1858 junior subjective synonym
- Melania lentiginosa var. nymphula Westerlund, 1883 junior subjective synonym
- Melania malayana Brot, 1877 junior subjective synonym
- Melania mauriciae Lesson, 1831 junior subjective synonym
- Melania moesta Hinds, 1844junior subjective synonym
- Melania nicobarica Tapparone Canefri, 1883 junior subjective synonym
- Melania ornata von dem Busch, 1842 junior homonym (invalid, not Michaud, 1828)
- Melania pellicens Tapparone Canefri, 1883 junior subjective synonym
- Melania punctulata Reeve, 1859 junior subjective synonym
- Melania pyramis Benson, 1836 junior subjective synonym
- Melania rivularis Philippi, 1847 junior subjective synonym
- Melania rodericensis E. A. Smith, 1876 junior subjective synonym
- Melania rothiana Mousson, 1861 junior subjective synonym
- Melania rubropunctata Tristram, 1865 junior subjective synonym
- Melania scalariformis Tenison Woods, 1879 junior subjective synonym
- Melania singularis Tapparone Canefri, 1877 junior subjective synonym
- Melania suturalis Philippi, 1847 junior subjective synonym
- Melania tamsii Dunker, 1845 junior subjective synonym
- Melania terebra Lesson, 1831 junior subjective synonym
- Melania tigrina T. Hutton, 1849 junior subjective synonym
- Melania timorensis Reeve, 1859 junior subjective synonym (suspected synonym)
- Melania trunculata Lamarck, 1822 junior subjective synonym
- Melania tuberculata (O. F. Müller, 1774) superseded combination
- Melania tuberculata var. angularis E. von Martens, 1897 junior subjective synonym (suspected synonym)
- Melania tuberculata var. malayana Issel, 1874 junior subjective synonym
- Melania tuberculata var. seminuda E. von Martens, 1897 junior subjective synonym (suspected synonym)
- Melania tuberculata var. victoriae Dautzenberg, 1908 junior homonym (invalid: preoccupied by Melania victoriae Dohrn, 1865)
- Melania turriculus I. Lea & H. C. Lea, 1851 junior subjective synonym
- Melania virgula Quoy & Gaimard, 1834 junior subjective synonym
- Melania virgulata Férussac, 1827 junior subjective synonym
- Melania waigiensis Brot, 1874 junior subjective synonym
- Melania wilkinsonii Tenison Woods, 1879 junior subjective synonym
- Melania zengana Morelet, 1860 junior subjective synonym
- Melanoides (Melanoides) tuberculata (O. F. Müller, 1774) · alternate representation
- Melanoides fasciolata Olivier, 1804 junior subjective synonym
- Melanoides flavidus (G. Nevill, 1885) junior subjective synonym
- Melanoides pyramis (Benson, 1836) junior subjective synonym
- Melanoides pyramis var. flavida (G. Nevill, 1885) junior subjective synonym
- Melanoides pyramis var. leopardina Annandale & Prashad, 1919 junior subjective synonym
- Melanoides pyramis var. luteomarginata (G. Nevill, 1885) · junior subjective synonym
- Melanoides pyramis var. puteicola Annandale & Prashad, 1919 junior subjective synonym
- Melanoides terebra (Lesson, 1831) junior subjective synonym
- Melanoides tigrina (T. Hutton, 1850) junior subjective synonym
- Melanoides tuberculata var. dautzenbergi Pilsbry & Bequaert, 1927 junior subjective synonym (replacement name for Melania tuberculata var. victoriae Dautzenberg, 1908)
- Melanoides tuberculatus (O. F. Müller, 1774) incorrect grammatical agreement of specific epithet
- Nerita tuberculata O. F. Müller, 1774 superseded combination
- Striatella tuberculata (O. F. Müller, 1774) superseded combination (Striatella is a junior synonym of...)
- Thiara baldwini (Ancey, 1899) junior subjective synonym
- Thiara rodericensis (E. A. Smith, 1876) junior subjective synonym
- Thiara tuberculata (O. F. Müller, 1774) superseded combination
- Turritella tuberculata Link, 1807 superseded combination
- Turritella turricula Link, 1807 junior subjective synonym

== See also ==
- List of introduced molluscs species of Venezuela
