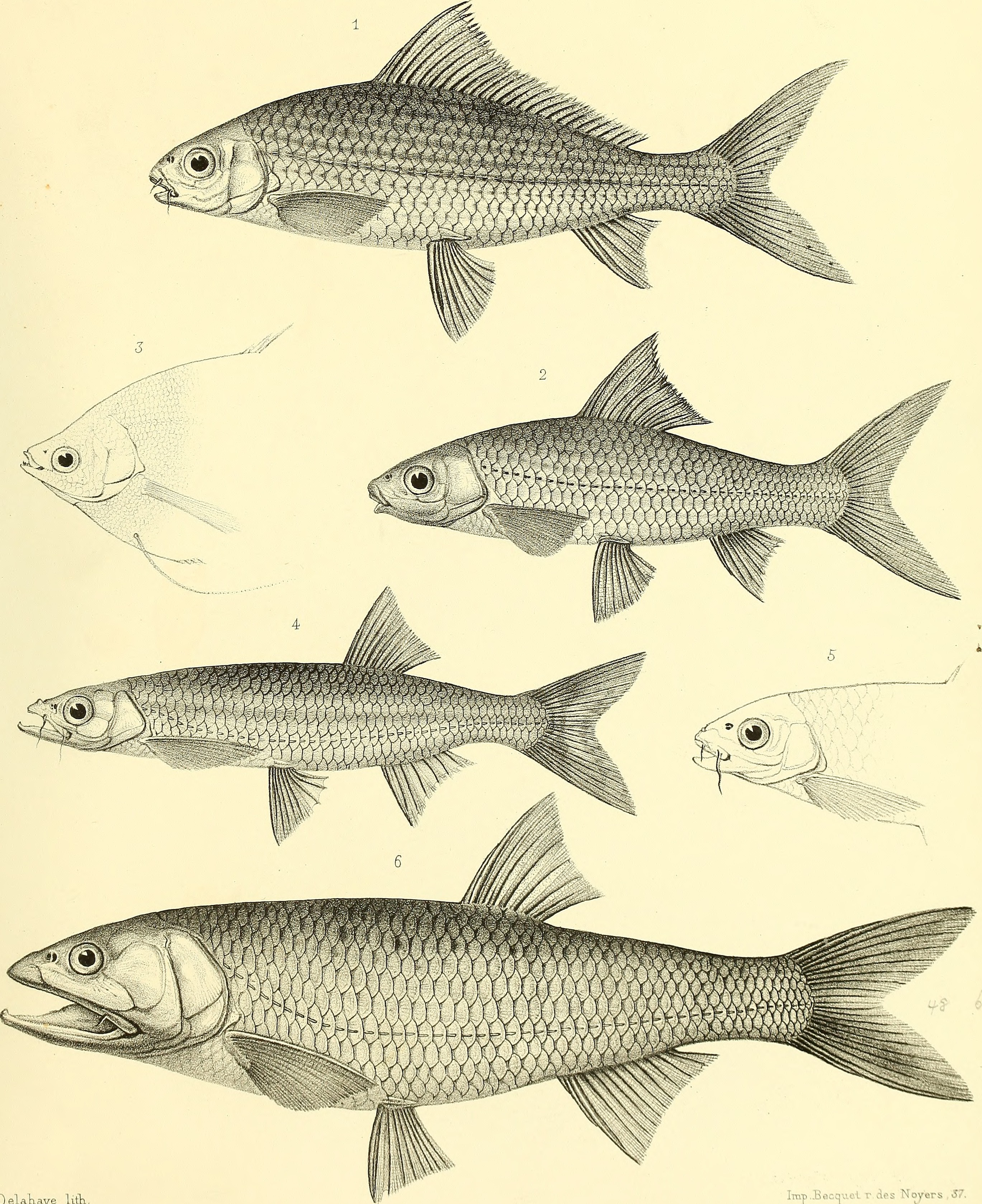

Scientific classification
- Kingdom: Animalia
- Phylum: Chordata
- Class: Actinopterygii
- Order: Cypriniformes
- Family: Cyprinidae
- Subfamily: Labeoninae
- Genus: Labiobarbus
- Species: L. lineatus

Binomial name
- Labiobarbus lineatus (Sauvage, 1878)

Synonyms
- Dangila lineata Sauvage, 1878

= Labiobarbus lineatus =

Species of fish

Labiobarbus lineatus is a species of freshwater ray-finned fish belonging to the family Cyprinidae. It is found in Asia. This species was first formally described as Dangila lineata in 1878 by the French zoologist Henri Émile Sauvage, with its type locality given as Stung Treng in the Mekong basin of Cambodia. This taxon has been considered to be a synonym of L. leptocheilus, but Eschmeyer's Catalog of Fishes recognises it as a valid species.

Labiobarbus lineatus has a fusiform body with a maximum total length of 15.5 cm (6.1 in).
