= M. oregonensis =

M. oregonensis may refer to:

- Marmara oregonensis, a moth species
- Metagonimoides oregonensis, a trematode species found in North America
- Methanolobus oregonensis, an Archaea species in the genus Methanolobus
- Moropus oregonensis, an extinct mammal species in the genus Moropus
- Mycena oregonensis, a mushroom species in the genus Mycena
