= Metagonimus miyatai =

Scientific classification
- Domain: Eukaryota
- Kingdom: Animalia
- Phylum: Platyhelminthes
- Class: Trematoda
- Order: Plagiorchiida
- Family: Heterophyidae
- Genus: Metagonimus
- Species: M. miyatai

Binomial name
- Metagonimus miyatai Saito, Chai, Kim, Lee and Rim, 1997

Species of fluke

Metagonimus miyatai is a species of a trematode, or fluke worm, in the family Heterophyidae.

It is a human parasite causing metagonimiasis.

== Distribution ==
This species occurs in Japan and Korea.

== Life cycle ==
The first intermediate hosts of Metagonimus miyatai include freshwater snails Semisulcospira libertina, Semisulcospira dolorosa, and Koreoleptoxis globus.

The second intermediate host include freshwater fish: Phoxinus lagowskii steindachneri, Zacco platypus, Nipponocypris temminckii, Plecoglossus altivelis, Tribolodon hakonensis, and Tribolodon brandtii, Opsariichthys bidens.

Natural definitive hosts are: dogs, red fox Vulpes vulpes japonica, Japanese raccoon dog Nyctereutes procyonoides viverrinus, black-eared kite Milvus migrans lineatus, and humans.

Experimental definitive hosts are: mice, rats, hamsters, and dogs.
