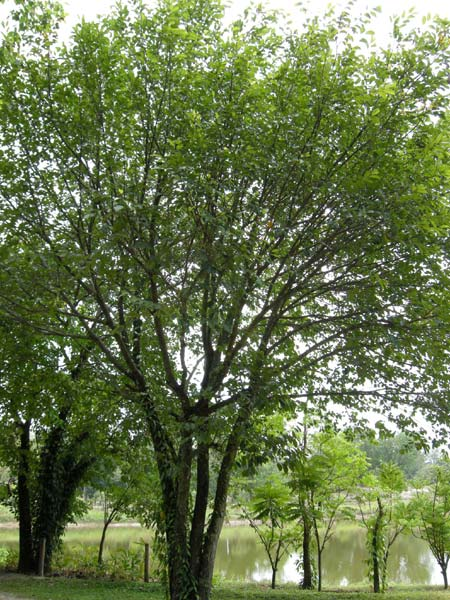

Conservation status
- Least Concern (IUCN 3.1)

Scientific classification
- Kingdom: Plantae
- Clade: Tracheophytes
- Clade: Angiosperms
- Clade: Eudicots
- Clade: Rosids
- Order: Rosales
- Family: Moraceae
- Genus: Artocarpus
- Species: A. lacucha

Binomial name
- Artocarpus lacucha Buch.-Ham.

Synonyms
- Artocarpus benghalensis Roxb. ex Wall., not validly publ.; Artocarpus cumingianus var. stenophyllus Diels; Artocarpus ficifolius W.T.Wang; Artocarpus lakoocha Roxb.; Artocarpus mollis Wall., not validly publ.; Artocarpus reticulatus B.Heyne ex Wall., not validly publ.; Artocarpus yunnanensis H.H.Hu; Prainea rumphiana Becc.; Saccus lakoocha (Roxb.) Kuntze

= Artocarpus lacucha =

Species of flowering plant

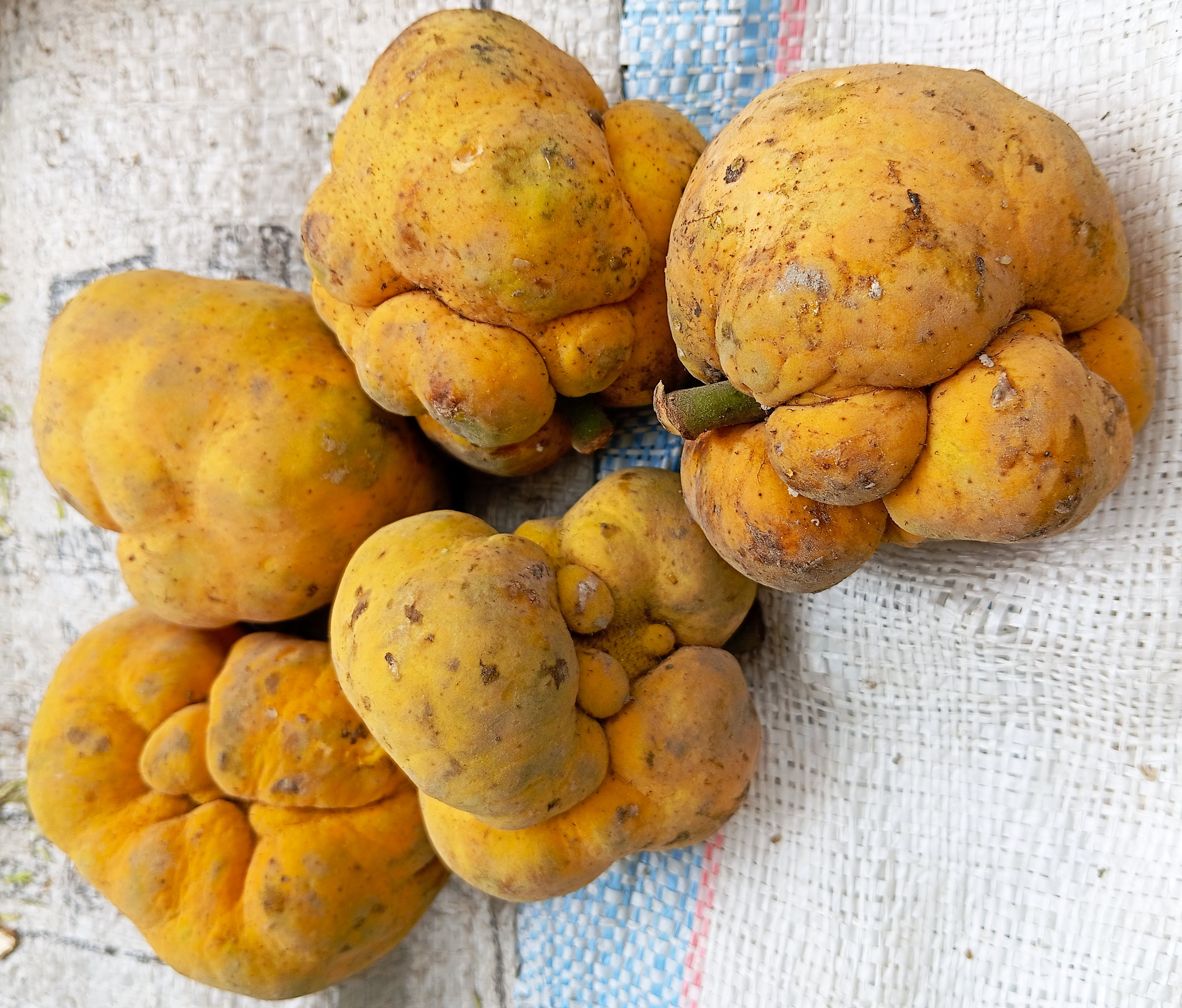
Fruits in Kolkata, India

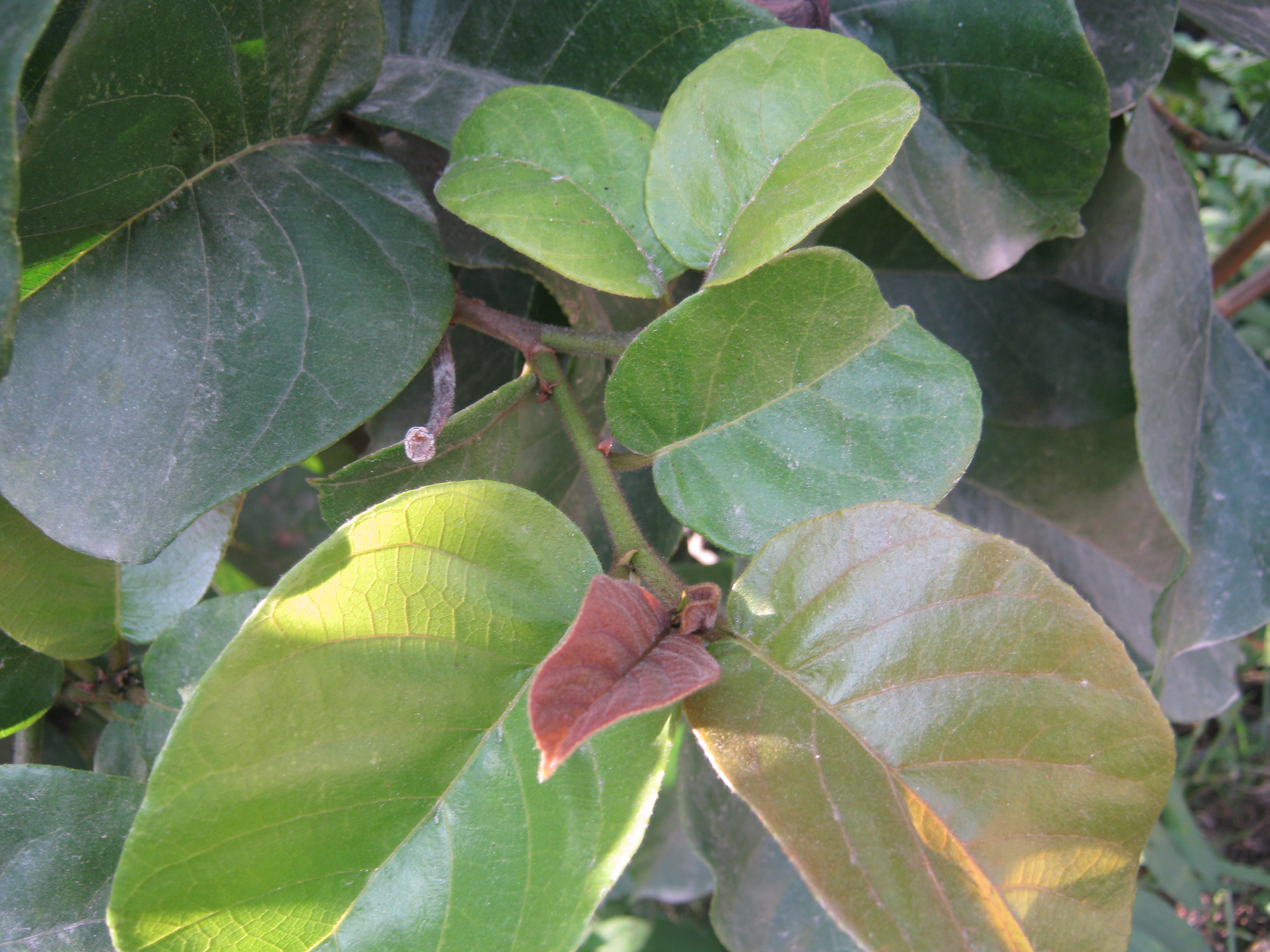
Twig in Panchkhal VDC, Nepal

Artocarpus lacucha, also known as monkey jack or monkey fruit, is a tropical evergreen tree species of the family Moraceae. It is distributed throughout the Indian subcontinent and Southeast Asia. The tree is valued for its wood; its fruit is edible and is believed to have medicinal value. In Northeastern Thailand, the wood is used to make pong lang, a local traditional instrument. This tree is mentioned in the Arthashastra.

== Uses ==
The stilbenoid oxyresveratrol can be isolated from the heartwood of Artocarpus lacucha as well as in Puag Haad, the light brown powder obtained from the aqueous extract of the wood chips of A. lakoocha by boiling, then slow evaporation, followed by cooling. This traditional drug is effective against the intestinal fluke Haplorchis taichui or against taeniasis.

Experiments have shown that the heme-peroxidase enzyme from Artocarpus lacucha has the ability to protect against oxidative damage in vitro and possesses wound healing properties. This stable enzyme also has anti-inflammatory properties, making it a potential candidate for use in biotechnological and industrial applications.

== See also ==
- Domesticated plants and animals of Austronesia
- Barharwa: A town in India named after the Hindi word for Artocarpus lacucha (Barhar)
