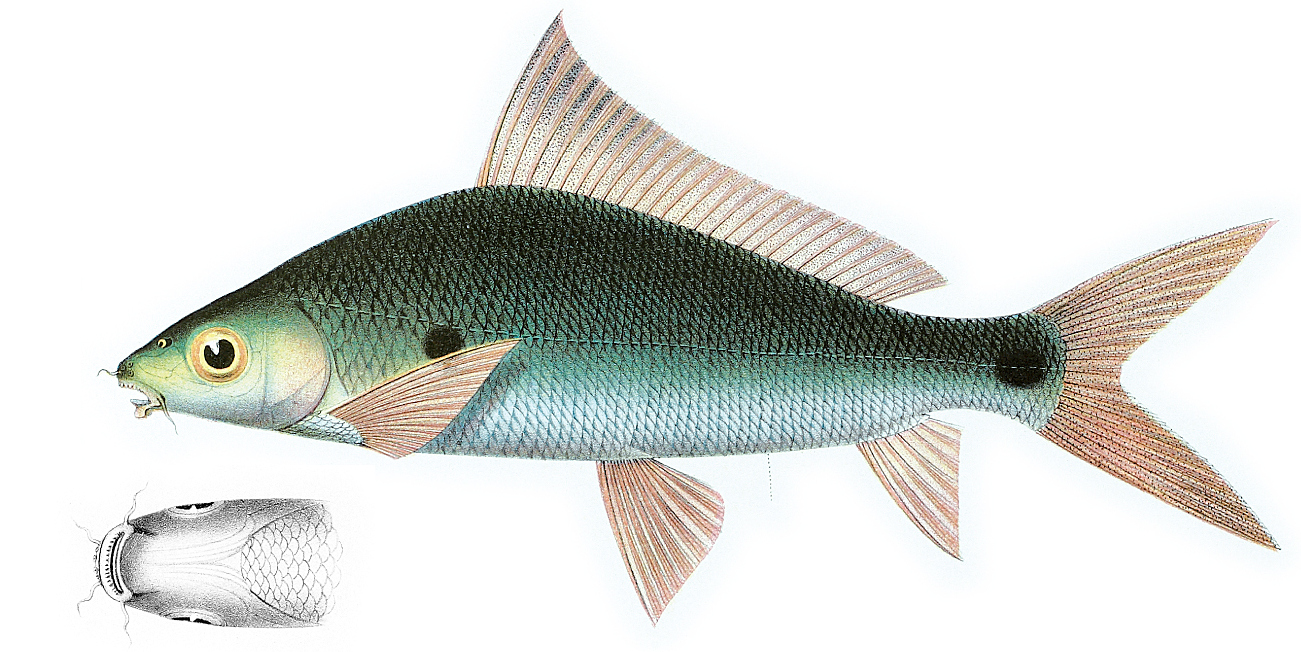

Scientific classification
- Domain: Eukaryota
- Kingdom: Animalia
- Phylum: Chordata
- Class: Actinopterygii
- Order: Cypriniformes
- Family: Cyprinidae
- Subfamily: Labeoninae
- Genus: Labiobarbus
- Species: L. ocellatus

Binomial name
- Labiobarbus ocellatus (Heckel, 1843)

Synonyms
- Cyrene ocellata Heckel, 1843; Dangila ocellata (Heckel, 1843); Dangila microlepis Bleeker, 1852

= Labiobarbus ocellatus =

Species of fish

Labiobarbus ocellatus is a species of cyprinid fish from Asia that occurs in Malaysia and Indonesia.
