= Metagonimoides =

Scientific classification
- Kingdom: Animalia
- Phylum: Platyhelminthes
- Class: Trematoda
- Order: Plagiorchiida
- Family: Heterophyidae
- Genus: Metagonimoides
- Species: M. oregonensis

Binomial name
- Metagonimoides oregonensis Price, 1931

Species of fluke

Metagonimoides oregonensis is a trematode, or fluke worm, in the family Heterophyidae. This North American parasite is found primarily in the intestines of raccoons (Procyon lotor), American minks (Neovision vision), frogs in the genus Rana, and freshwater snails in the genus Goniobasis. It was first described in 1931 by E. W. Price. The parasite has a large distribution, from Oregon to North Carolina. Adult flukes vary in host range and morphology dependent on the geographical location. This results in different life cycles, as well as intermediate hosts, across the United States. On the west coast, the intermediate host is freshwater snails (Goniobasis), while on the east coast the intermediate host is salamanders (Desmognathus). The parasites on the west coast are generally much larger than on the east coast. For example, the pharynx as well as the body of the parasite are distinctly larger in Oregon than in North Carolina. The reverse pattern is observed on the east coast for uterine eggs, which are larger on the west coast. In snails, there is also a higher rate of infection in female snails than in males. Research on the life history traits of the parasites have been performed with hamsters and frogs as model species.

== Life cycle ==
In order to understand the life cycle, biologists have used hamsters as model species. Hamsters are infected with adult parasites that are able to lay eggs inside their intestines. While hamsters are not an ideal host, the parasite still infects them and deposits brown eggs in the intestines. For the studies, the eggs are taken out of the hamster's intestines and put into an incubator to resemble the intestines of the hamster giving the parasites an ideal environment to grow. It only takes 23 days of incubation for the egg to hatch into a moving, ciliated miracidium. Miracidium is the stage in which the larvae are free swimming and are able to move to its first intermediate host. After continual incubation of around 4 months there was no physiological change in the miracidium, which means Metagonimoides oregonensis can start infecting its first intermediate host in less than a month. This was followed by an experiment that was testing if warm water and different solutions would create the miracidium. Testing this might answer if and when the miracidium would form and be able to infect in different geological locations. All of the trials failed leaving biologist unable to give direct answers.

Biologists began looking at the different life cycle stages involved in Metagonimoides oregonensis in the wild compared to the parasite in captivity. For this experiment snails were used as the intermediate host. Rediae are larvae which are produced within the sporocyst of trematodes that creates more rediae or can become cercariae. Cercariae are larval trematode worms that form from rediae. When the snail was infected in the wild there was no sign of immature rediae. This means there was no reproduction of the parasite. When looking at the snail in captivity though, there were signs of the immature rediae. Since the snails in captivity were not being exposed to the parasite there was no reinfection occurring. In conclusion this experiment shows that rediae reproduced when they were not being continually exposed. When they were being continually exposed though, rediae were not being produced.

== Primary host ==
In the western United States the primary host are mainly raccoons (Procyon lotor) with the possibility of minks (Neovison vison) as well. Adult Metagonimoides oregonensis are found in the intestines of these mammals. Through the parasite's eggs in the primary host's fecal matter transmission to another host is made easy. Prosobranch snails which are found in rivers and streams are then infected with miracidia from the fecal matter from the primary hosts. It is unknown if a prosobranch snail needs to ingest the miracidia to become infected, or if the miracidia are free-swimming. This is how our first intermediate host becomes infected.

== First intermediate host ==
As previously stated there are different adult morphologies of the parasite depending on the part of the United States they are in. This applies to the first intermediate host as well. Considering in different parts of the country there are different species, the parasites naturally have to adapt to different hosts in order to survive. In the west it has been found that the first intermediate host are freshwater snails Juga oxytrema or Juga goniobasis. While in the eastern part of the United States another species of fresh water snails (Pleurocera goniobasis) has been found to be the first intermediate host for Metagonimoides oregonensis. Furthermore, studies have shown that the parasite can display life cycle variations also on a smaller scale, as for instance seen in different parts of Oregon.

== Second intermediate host ==
Looking at Metagonimoides oregonensis in Oregon, freshwater snails Juga silicula are its first intermediate host. There are a couple different situations that can arise concerning the life cycle. It is possible that the metacercariae will immediately form within the snail it has already infected, or Metagonimoides oregonensis can produce free-swimming cercariae that will soon become metacercariae if it infects the Rana genus of frogs. Studies have shown that it is possible for the cercariae to infect multiple different frogs, including red-legged frogs (Rana aurora), bullfrogs (Lithobates catesbeianus, formerly Rana catesbeiana), and leopard frogs (Lithobates pipiens, formerly Rana pipiens). In another case where Juga nigrina, another species of freshwater snail, is the first intermediate host the metacercariae can not become free-swimming and therefore do not gain a second intermediate host.

In the eastern part of the United States it is believed that metacercariae does not form in the first intermediate host, but rather free swimming cercariae are formed from the rediae and immediately infect the larva of stream salamanders. One of the most common secondary intermediate hosts is the black-bellied salamander (Desmognathus quadramaculatus). These salamanders are found mainly in streams and small rivers, and rarely seen out of the water, which could explain why they are such a popular host for the free swimming cercariae. They are only located in a couple states on the eastern side of the country, so this could also explain why this pattern is not seen on the western side.

== Sources ==
- Meade, T. G.; Pratt, I. (1966). "Changes in the Redia and Metacercaria of Metagonimoides oregonensis Price, 1931, Transplanted from Infected to Uninfected Snails" (PDF). Journal of Helminthological Society. 33 (1): 35–37.
