= Labiobarbus siamensis =

Conservation status
- Least Concern (IUCN 3.1)

Scientific classification
- Kingdom: Animalia
- Phylum: Chordata
- Class: Actinopterygii
- Division: Teleostei
- Order: Cypriniformes
- Family: Cyprinidae
- Subfamily: Labeoninae
- Genus: Labiobarbus
- Species: L. siamensis

Binomial name
- Labiobarbus siamensis Sauvage, 1881

Synonyms
- Dangila siamensis Sauvage, 1881; Dangila spilopleura Smith, 1934; Labiobarbus spilopleura Smith, 1934

Species of fish

Labiobarbus siamensis is a freshwater fish of the family Cyprinidae native to the rivers of Thailand.

== Habitat ==
Labiobarbus siamensis inhabits freshwater rivers and other inland waterways.

== Dispersion ==
Chao Phraya River, Mekong River, Mae Klong River, and the southern tributary of Thailand.

== Utilization ==
It is caught in fisheries and is used for trade.
