= Stenomelania boninensis =

Scientific classification
- Kingdom: Animalia
- Phylum: Mollusca
- Class: Gastropoda
- Subclass: Caenogastropoda
- Order: incertae sedis
- Family: Thiaridae
- Genus: Stenomelania
- Species: S. boninensis

Binomial name
- Stenomelania boninensis (I. Lea, 1856)

Synonyms
- Melania boninensis Lea, 1856

Species of gastropod

Stenomelania boninensis is a species of freshwater snail, an aquatic gastropod mollusc in the family Thiaridae.

The specific name boninensis refer to Bonin Islands, where this species occur.

The sister species of Stenomelania boninensis is Stenomelania juncea.

== Distribution ==
Distribution of Stenomelania boninensis include Bonin Islands only, Japan.

The type locality is "Bonin Islands".

== Distribution ==
Stenomelania boninensis inhabits rivers.
