= Labiobarbus sabanus =

Scientific classification
- Domain: Eukaryota
- Kingdom: Animalia
- Phylum: Chordata
- Class: Actinopterygii
- Order: Cypriniformes
- Family: Cyprinidae
- Subfamily: Labeoninae
- Genus: Labiobarbus
- Species: L. sabanus

Binomial name
- Labiobarbus sabanus (Inger & Chin, 1962)

Synonyms
- Dangila sabana

Species of fish

Labiobarbus sabanus is a species of ray-finned fish in the genus Labiobarbus endemic to the Kinabatangan and Segama river basins in Sabah.
