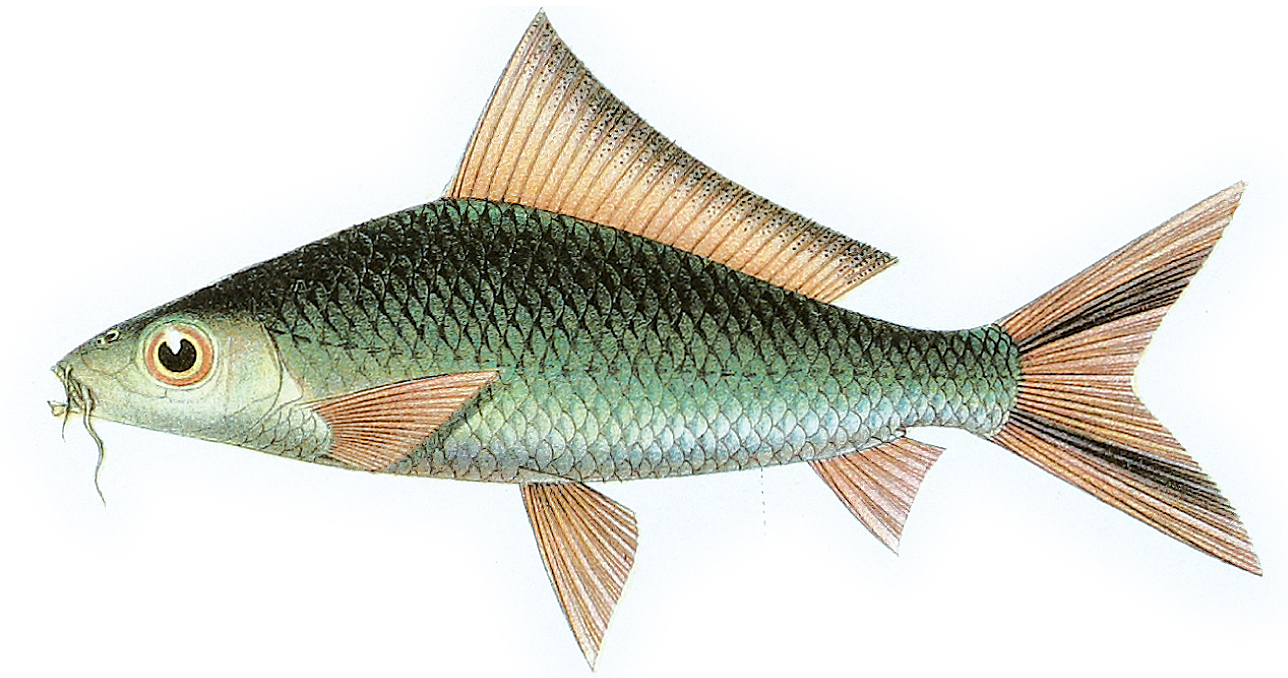

Scientific classification
- Kingdom: Animalia
- Phylum: Chordata
- Class: Actinopterygii
- Order: Cypriniformes
- Family: Cyprinidae
- Subfamily: Labeoninae
- Genus: Labiobarbus
- Species: L. festivus

Binomial name
- Labiobarbus festivus (Heckel, 1843)

Synonyms
- Cyrene festiva; Dangila festiva; Labiobarbus festiva

= Signal barb =

Species of fish

The signal barb (Labiobarbus festivus) is a species of ray-finned fish in the family Cyprinidae. It is found in the southern Malay Peninsula.
