= Stenomelania juncea =

Scientific classification
- Kingdom: Animalia
- Phylum: Mollusca
- Class: Gastropoda
- Subclass: Caenogastropoda
- Order: incertae sedis
- Family: Thiaridae
- Genus: Stenomelania
- Species: S. juncea

Binomial name
- Stenomelania juncea (I. Lea & H. C. Lea, 1851)

Synonyms
- Melania juncea I. Lea & H. C. Lea, 1851

Species of gastropod

Stenomelania juncea is a species of freshwater snail, an aquatic gastropod mollusk in the family Thiaridae.

The sister species of Stenomelania juncea is Stenomelania boninensis.

== Distribution ==
The type locality is Taal Lake and small streams, Batangas, Luzon, Philippines.

== Parasites ==
Stenomelania juncea is the first intermediate host for the trematode Haplorchis taichui.
