= Telogaster =

- Scanning electron micrograph of an excysted metacercaria of Telogaster opisthorchis

Scientific classification
- Kingdom: Animalia
- Phylum: Platyhelminthes
- Class: Trematoda
- Order: Plagiorchiida
- Family: Cryptogonimidae
- Genus: Telogaster; Macfarlane, 1945
- Species: T. opisthorchis

Binomial name
- Telogaster opisthorchis Macfarlane, 1945

Genus of flukes

Telogaster opisthorchis is an endoparasite in the class Trematoda within the phylum Platyhelminthes. This fluke is known for causing tumor like malformations in fishes (intermediate host) by attaching onto its spinal region in the metacercariae form. Malformations cause fish to become more susceptible to fish eating predators (definitive host) allowing T. opisthorchis to continue with its lifecycle.

== Morphology ==
The body of the T. opisthorchis has the shape of a long ellipse. The sucker is about one-third the diameter of the oral sucker. The sucker is used to latch onto its host as well as aid in copulation. T. opisthorchis also contain unicellular gland-like bodies which open through the cuticle of the anterior half of the adult and are present on the posterior end of the acetabulum. The alimentary system is made up of mobile sphincteric lips which surround the terminal mouth. The oral sucker is small and ovoid when contracted, changing to a truncated cone when relaxed.

== Reproduction ==
Telogaster opisthorchis reproduce via sexual and asexual reproduction. Males have testis which produce sperm and have a very primitive vas deferens. During copulation, sperm is ejaculated out of the male and into the female uterus where it is stored in the seminal receptacle and fertilization of the eggs occur. After fertilization, meiosis occurs and development begins. The "eggs" are not eggs like we think but rather shelled embryos and are often called embryonated eggs to distinguish them from unfertilized eggs.

== Lifecycle ==
The adult stage of trematode T. opisthorchis is found in the intestine of both the shortfinned eel, Anguilla australis, and the longfinned eel, A. dieffenbachii. Eggs are released in the intestine and passed out of the host into the water. Following ingestion by the first intermediate host, the snail Potampyrgus antipodarum, where the eggs hatch and the larvae undergo asexual replication. Free-swimming cercariae leave the snail and penetrate the skin of the fish Galaxias anomalus, which act as secondary intermediate hosts. Inside the fish, the parasites encyst in the body cavity, the musculature, or other organs. Metacercarial cysts are about 1 mm in diameter and are easily seen as small white colored lumps, sometimes through the skin of live fish. The life cycle is completed when an infected fish is eaten by an eel and where sexual reproduction occurs.

== Transmission ==
Embryonated eggs are passed in feces from the definitive hosts, the shortfinned eel, Anguilla australis, and the longfinned eel, A. dieffenbachii. The eggs are ingested by its next host, the snail Potampyrgus antipodarum. Inside the snail, the eggs hatch and develop into cercariae. Free-swimming cercariae leave the snail and encyst in the skin or flesh of Galaxias anomalus, which act as secondary intermediate hosts. Metacercariae in flesh or skin of the small fish are then ingested by an eel completing the transmission cycle.

== Pathology ==
Telogaster opisthorchis can be diagnosed by examining the outer appearance of the host. Generally, the metacercariae of T. opisthorchis will result in characteristic spinal and fin abnormalities that can be observed in the late larval and early juvenile stages of the host. In addition, some other Galaxias species also experience head and jaw disfigurements. At times, metacercarial cysts may also be observed through the skin of the host. The cysts are seen as mini, white colored bumps that are approximately 1mm in diameter.

Currently, there is no treatment for T. opisthorchis. Vector control of first intermediate hosts is the only viable option towards combating T. opsithorchis.
