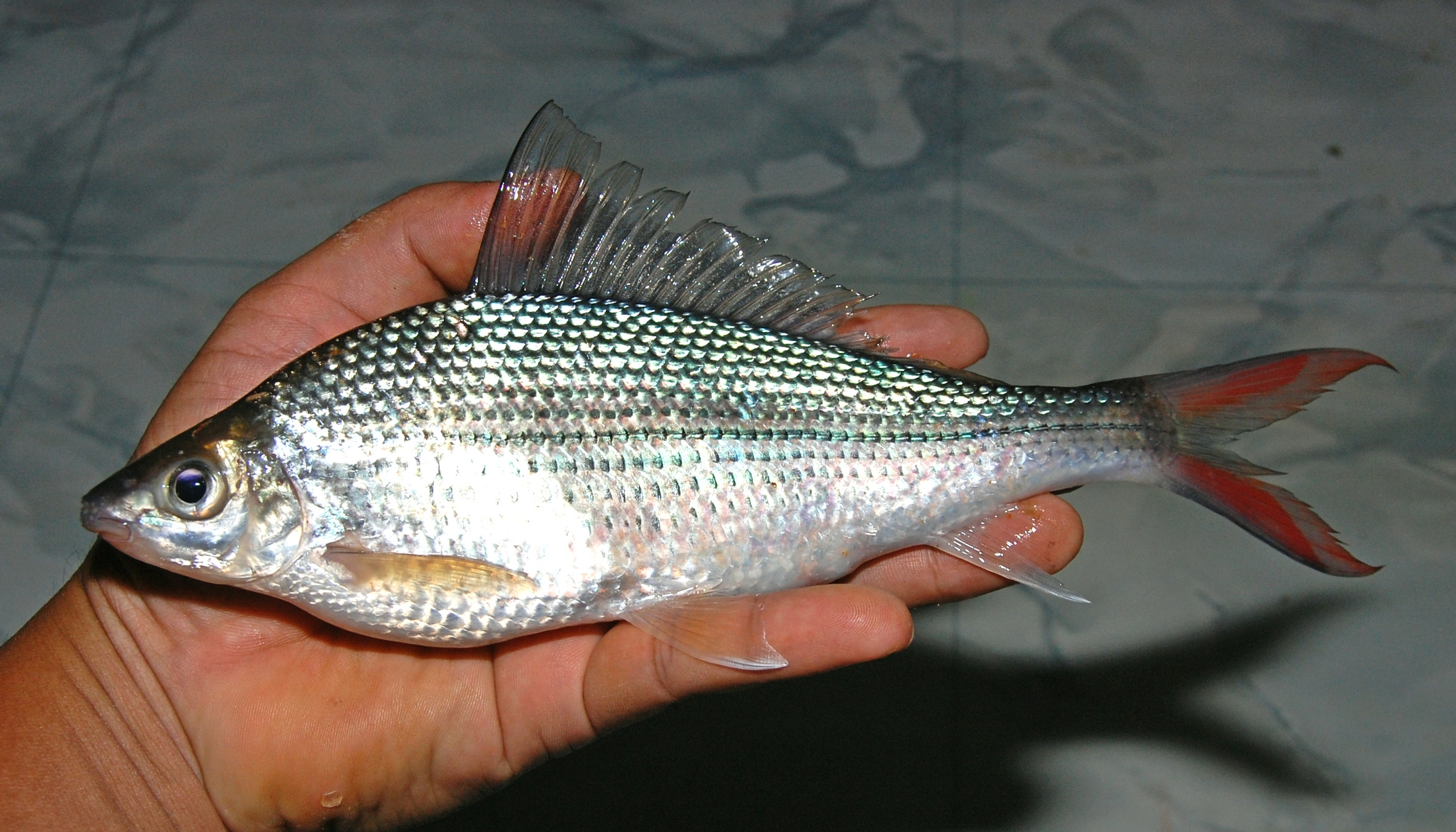

Scientific classification
- Kingdom: Animalia
- Phylum: Chordata
- Class: Actinopterygii
- Order: Cypriniformes
- Family: Cyprinidae
- Subfamily: Labeoninae
- Genus: Labiobarbus
- Species: L. fasciatus

Binomial name
- Labiobarbus fasciatus (Bleeker, 1853)

Synonyms
- Dangila fasciata; Dangila koedjem; Dangila taeniata

= Labiobarbus fasciatus =

Species of fish

Labiobarbus fasciatus is a species of ray-finned fish in the family Cyprinidae. It is found in Indonesia and Malaysia.
