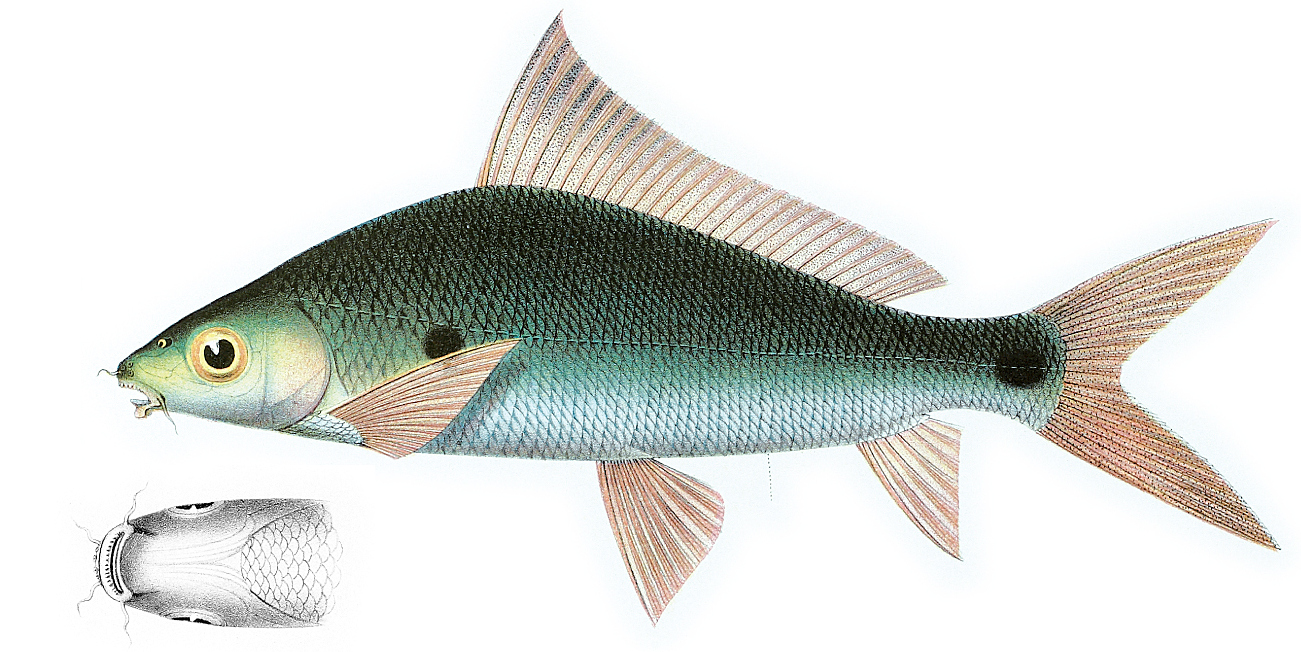
- Labiobarbus ocellatus

Scientific classification
- Domain: Eukaryota
- Kingdom: Animalia
- Phylum: Chordata
- Class: Actinopterygii
- Order: Cypriniformes
- Family: Cyprinidae
- Subfamily: Labeoninae
- Genus: Labiobarbus van Hasselt, 1823

Type species
- Dangila leptocheila Valenciennes, 1842

Synonyms
- Cyrene Heckel, 1843; Dangila Valenciennces, 1842

= Labiobarbus =

Genus of fishes

Labiobarbus is a genus of cyprinid fish found in Southeast Asia. It currently contains nine described species.

== Species ==
These are the species classified in this genus:

- Labiobarbus fasciatus (Bleeker, 1853)
- Labiobarbus festivus (Heckel, 1843) (Signal barb)
- Labiobarbus lamellifer Kottelat, 1994
- Labiobarbus leptocheilus (Valenciennes, 1842)
- Labiobarbus lineatus (Sauvage, 1878)
- Labiobarbus ocellatus (Heckel, 1843)
- Labiobarbus sabanus (Inger & P. K. Chin, 1962)
- Labiobarbus siamensis (Sauvage, 1881)
