= Labiobarbus lamellifer =

Scientific classification
- Domain: Eukaryota
- Kingdom: Animalia
- Phylum: Chordata
- Class: Actinopterygii
- Order: Cypriniformes
- Family: Cyprinidae
- Subfamily: Labeoninae
- Genus: Labiobarbus
- Species: L. lamellifer

Binomial name
- Labiobarbus lamellifer Kottelat, 1994

Species of fish

Labiobarbus lamellifer is a species of ray-finned fish in the genus Labiobarbus found in eastern Borneo.
