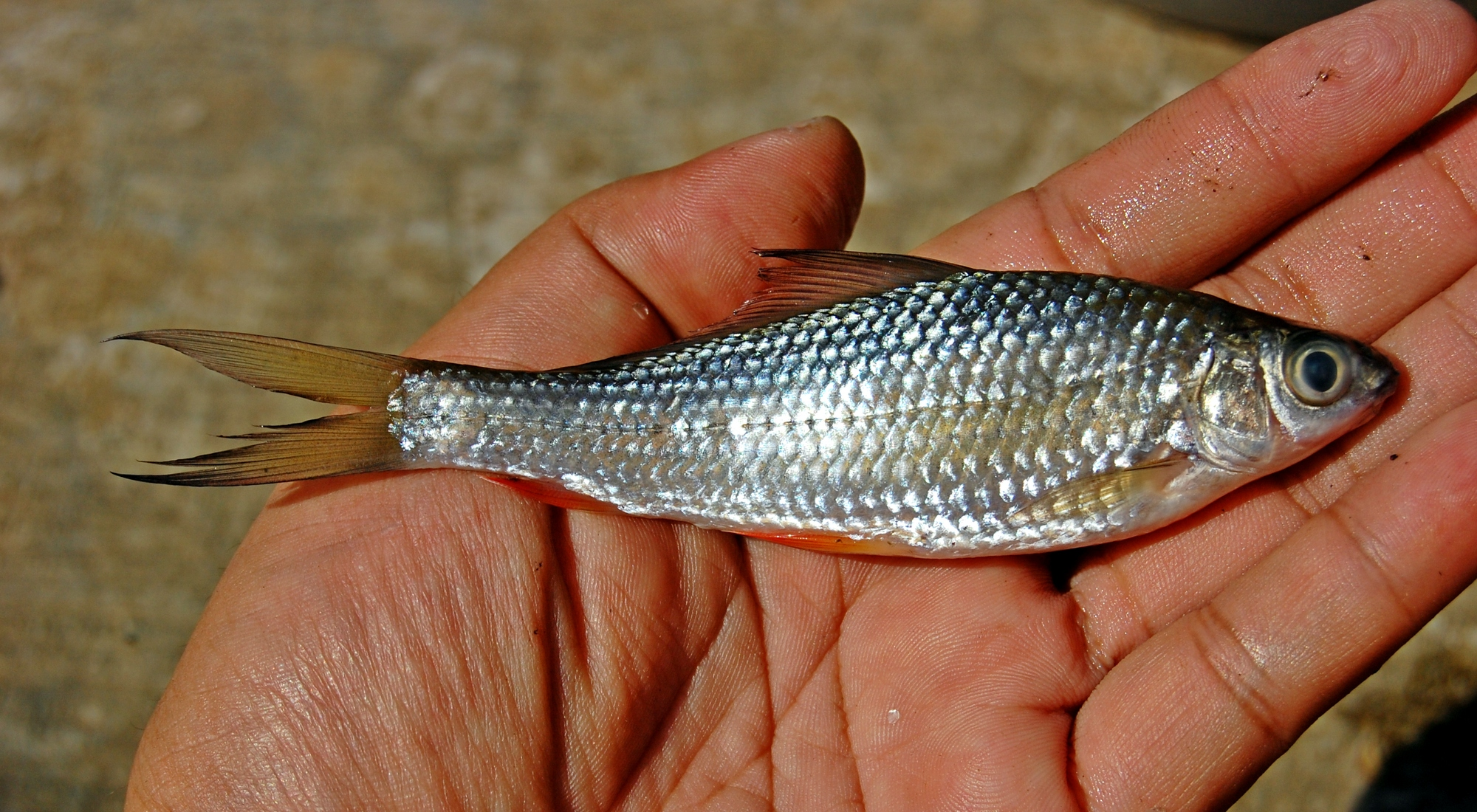

Scientific classification
- Domain: Eukaryota
- Kingdom: Animalia
- Phylum: Chordata
- Class: Actinopterygii
- Order: Cypriniformes
- Family: Cyprinidae
- Subfamily: Labeoninae
- Genus: Labiobarbus
- Species: L. leptocheilus

Binomial name
- Labiobarbus leptocheilus (Valenciennes, 1842)

Synonyms
- Cyrene philippinia; Dangila berdmorei; Dangila burmanica; Dangila burmanicus; Dangila cuvieri; Dangila kuhli; Dangila kuhlii; Dangila leptocheila; Dangila leptocheilus; Dangila rosea; Dangila sumatrana; Labiobarbus berdmorei; Labiobarbus burmanicus; Labiobarbus cuvieri; Labiobarbus kuhli; Labiobarbus kuhlii; Labiobarbus leptocheila; Labiobarbus sumatranus

= Labiobarbus leptocheilus =

Species of fish

Labiobarbus leptocheilus is a species of ray-finned fish in the genus Labiobarbus found in the Mekong, Salween, Chao Phraya and Xe Bangfai basins, and from the Malay Peninsula, Sumatra, Java and Borneo.
