= Metagonimiasis =

- Specialty: Infectious diseases, helminthologist

Metagonimiasis is a disease caused by an intestinal trematode, most commonly Metagonimus yokagawai, but sometimes by M. takashii or M. miyatai. The metagonimiasis-causing flukes are one of two minute flukes called the heterophyids. Metagonimiasis was described by Katsurasa in 1911–1913 when he first observed eggs of M. yokagawai in feces (date is disputed in various studies). M. takahashii was described later first by Suzuki in 1930 and then M. miyatai was described in 1984 by Saito.

== Signs and symptoms ==
The main symptoms are diarrhea and colicky abdominal pain. Because symptoms are often mild, infections can often be easily overlooked but diagnosis is important. Flukes attach to the wall of the small intestine, but are often asymptomatic unless in large numbers. Infection can occur from eating a single infected fish source. Peripheral eosinophilia is associated especially in early phase. When present in large numbers, can cause chronic intermittent diarrhea, nausea, and vague abdominal pains. Clinical complaints can also include lethargy and anorexia. In acute metagonimiasis, clinical manifestations are developed only 5–7 days after infection. Heavy infection has also been associated with epigastric distress, fatigue, and malaise.

Occasionally, flukes invade the mucosa and eggs deposited in tissue may gain access to circulation. This can then lead to eggs embolizing in the brain, spinal cord, or heart. Granulomas may form around eggs and can cause seizures, neurologic deficits, or cardiac insufficiency.

An interesting case in Japan found diabetes mellitus (DM) to be a sign of chronic infection with intracerebral hemorrhages as the acute sign of aggravation<. Two months after administering praziquantel, the hemorrhages were gone, as was the diabetes. This unique case shows the potential of additional symptoms associated with metagonimiasis that are still unknown.

== Cause ==
Metagonimiasis is most commonly caused by one of the two smallest flukes known to infect man, Metagonimus yokogawai, also called the Japanese fluke. More rarely, metagonimiasis can arise from infection with M. takahashii or M. miyatai. Recent studies analyzing the DNA of the three agents causing metagonimiasis found that DNA sequencing supports M. yokagawai and M. takahashii be placed in the same clade, and phylogenic tree analysis supports their genetic similarity. M. miyatai, however, was found to be more genetically distinct, and the authors concluded it should be nominated as a separate species. An additional study examining karyotype data on the three disease-causing agents also supported the nomination of M. miyatai as a separate species.

Trematodes are one class of phylum Platyhelminthes from the order Digenea and are generally referred to as flukes. Metagonimiasis is of the family Heterophyidae.

=== Transmission ===
Transmission requires two intermediate hosts, the first of which is snails, most commonly of species Semisucospira libertina, Semiculcospira coreana, and Thiara granifera.

Infection is acquired through the secondary intermediate host, fish, that have not been thoroughly cooked. Metacercariae encyst under the scales or in the flesh of fish from fresh or brackish water. Sweetfish (Pecoglossus altevelis) is one of the most common fish species infected, but others include the golden carp (Carassius auratus), common carp (Cyprinus carpio), Zacco temminckii, Protimus steindachneri, Acheilognathus lancedata, and Pseudorashora parva.

Definitive hosts include humans and various fish-eating mammals, primarily dogs, cats, and pigs. Fish-eating birds may also be infected with metagonimiasis.

=== Reservoirs ===
Reservoirs include fish-eating mammals such as dogs, cats and pigs as well as fish-eating birds. The presence of heterophyid infection in humans is generally caused by a lack of host specificity by the parasites, as seen in the many non-human reservoirs for metagonimiasis. The many reservoirs also have negative implications on the efficacy of prevention and eradication efforts of the disease.

Carp have also been identified as reservoirs of the parasite.

=== Incubation period ===
The incubation period is around 14 days and infestation may persist for more than one year.

=== Morphology ===
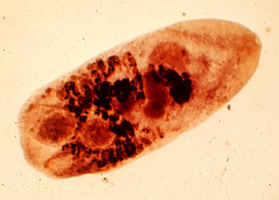
Adult Fluke (from CDC)

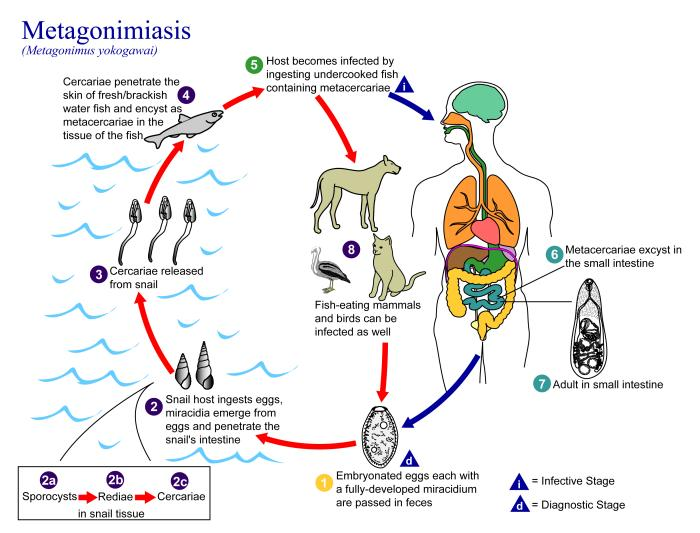
Life cycle of Metagonimus yokogawai.

==== Eggs ====
The morphology of the eggs is very important for diagnosis, but is difficult as eggs are very small. Eggs have a smooth, hard shell that is transparent and yellow-brown with a more conventional, ovoid egg shape. They are about the same size as those of Heterophyes and Clonorchis, usually measuring 26-28 μm length and 15-17μm width. The egg also has a very slight opercular shoulder, marking the line of cleavage between the shell and operculum, an "escape hatch" for the miracidium. The Clonorchis has more distinctive tapering and a seated operculum that help distinguish it more readily from Metagonimus species.

==== Adult flukes ====
The body of the adult disease-causing agent of metagonimiasis is often described as leaf-shaped, similar to most trematodes. It is one of the smallest intestinal flukes, and is only slightly larger than Heteropheres. The most prominent feature is that its ventral sucker is deflected to the right of its midline and is closely associated with the opening of the genital pore. The testes are large and diagonal to each other while the smaller ovary is anterior to the testes and the uterus is filled with eggs. The uterus winds forward to the genital pore and is the largest organ in the body. The size of the adult fluke does not exceed 2.5 mm length by .75 mm width.

== Diagnosis ==
Metagonimiasis is diagnosed by eggs seen in feces. Only after antihelminthic treatment will adult worms be seen in the feces, and then can be used as part of a diagnostic procedure. A 1993 analysis of the efficacy of ELISA tests to diagnose metagonimiasis implied that simultaneous screening of specific antibodies to several parasite agents are important in serological diagnosis of acute parasitic disease and more research should be done on the efficacy of these methods of diagnosis.

Diagnosis may be difficult because the egg-laying capacity of heterophyids is limited, and therefore sedimentation concentration procedures may be needed to demonstrate eggs in lighter infections. Accurate species identification is also difficult because eggs of most flukes are similar in size and morphology, especially those of Heterophyes heterophyes, Clonorchis and Opisthorchis. It is important to ask where the person may have contracted the disease, find out if they have been to en endemic area, and check for signs and symptoms that would lead to metagonimiasis.

== Prevention ==
Several public health prevention strategies could help lower the rates of metagonimiasis. One is to control the intermediate host (snails). This can be done through use of molluscidals. Another is to use education to ensure all people, especially in areas were the disease regularly occurs, fully cook all fish. This could potentially be problematic and not as effective as hoped as many of the people affected by metagonimiasis eat raw or pickled fish as part of a traditional, long-seated dietary practice. Additionally, implementing more sanitary water conditions would reduce the continual reintroduction of eggs to water sources, thus restarting the lifecycle. Complete control of metagonimiasis presents several potential problems because it does have several reservoir hosts, thus eradication is unlikely.

== Treatment ==
Praziquantel is recommended in both adult and pediatric cases with dosages of 75 mg/kg/d in 3 doses for 1 day. Praziquantel is a Praziniozoquinoline derivative that alters the calcium flux through the parasite tectum and causes muscular paralysis and detachment of the fluke. Prizaquantel should be taken with liquids during a meal and as provided commercially as Biltricide. Praziquantel is not approved by the U.S. Food and Drug Administration (FDA) for treatment of metagonimiasis, but is approved for use on other parasitic infections.

Praziquantel has some side effects but they are generally relatively mild and transient and a review of evidence shows it overall a well-tolerated drug. Possible side effects include abdominal pain, allergy, diarrhea, headache, liver problems, nausea or vomiting, exacerbation of porphyries, pruritus, rash, somnolence, vertigo, or dizziness. In fact, in 2002, the World Health Organization recommended the use of Praziquantel in pregnant and lactating women, though controlled trials are still needed to verify this.

Another possible drug option is Tetrachloroethylene, a chlorinated hydrocarbon, but its use has been superseded by new antihelminthic drugs (like Praziquantel). A 1978 study also looked at the efficacy of several drugs on metagonimiasis infection, including bithionol, niclosamide, nicoflan, and Praziquantel. All drugs showed lower prevalence of eggs in feces, however only Praziquantel showed complete radical cure. Therefore, the authors concluded Praziquantel was the most highly effective, was very well tolerated, and was the most promising drug against metagonimiasis.

== Epidemiology ==
Metagonimiasis infections are endemic or potentially endemic in 19 countries including Japan, Korea, China, Taiwan, the Balkans, Spain, Indonesia, the Philippines and Russia. Human infections outside endemic areas may result from ingesting pickled fish or sushi made from fish imported from endemic areas.

=== Korea ===
Food-borne trematodes are currently the most important parasitic infections in Korea and approximately 240,000 Koreans are believed to be currently infected. Of the 240,000 estimated to be infected, 120,000 are caused by M. yokagawai, 20,000 by M. takahashii, and 100,000 by M. miyatai. The national rate of infections among randomly selected people was 1.2% in 1981, 1.0% in 1986, and down to 0.5% in 2004. M. yokagawai infections are found mostly around the large and small streams where sweetfish live and have been identified as endemic foci. M. miyatai and M. takahashii are prevalent along the upper reaches of the big rivers where minnows and carps are caught for eating raw.

=== Japan ===
Metagonimiasis is also common in Japan, with 10-15% prevalence rates in populations bordering major rivers and 150,000 estimated infected. Food-borne trematodes are most common in rural areas where traditional food habits are more preserved and raw freshwater fishes are incorporated into the diet. Both clonorchiasis and metagonimiasis have become infections of higher social classes in Hong Kong and Japan, owing to their frequent consumption of raw fish.

=== India ===
There have also recently been two reported cases in India, a location in which occurrence of infection is almost unknown. The second case, in 2005, was in a 6-year-old female patient presenting with loose watery stools for four days (however more details were not obtained as the patient was both deaf and dumb since birth). Upon examination, M. yokagawai eggs were found in stool, but the patient left and further analysis and treatment could not be completed.

== See also ==
- List of parasites (human)
