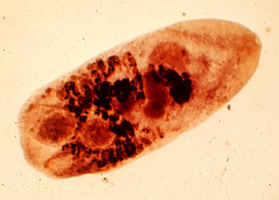
- Metagonimus yokogawai specimen

Scientific classification
- Kingdom: Animalia
- Phylum: Platyhelminthes
- Class: Trematoda
- Order: Plagiorchiida
- Suborder: Opisthorchiata
- Superfamily: Opisthorchioidea
- Family: Heterophyidae; Leiper, 1909

= Heterophyidae =

Family of intestinal worms

Heterophyidae is a family of intestinal trematodes in the order Plagiorchiida.

Description: "Tegument covered by spines. Oral sucker not armed or armed by circumoral spines. Pharynx presented. Genital synus presented. Ventral and genital suckers usually not combined. Cirrus and bursa absent. Two testes located in posterior part of the body. Vitellaria in posterior part of the body."

First intermediate hosts are molluscs of Prosobranchia, second intermediate hosts are fishes. Definite hosts are birds and mammals, including humans.

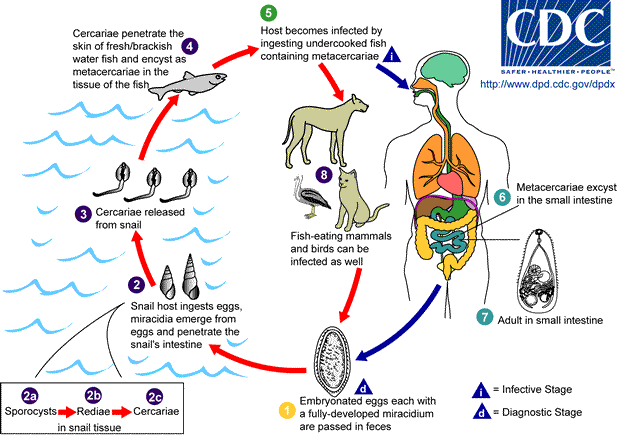
Life cycle of Heterophyes heterophyes

== Genera ==
- Acanthotrema Travassos, 1928
- Acetodextra
- Alloheterophyes Pearson, 1999
- Apophallus Lühe, 1909
- Ascocotyle Looss, 1899
- Centrocestus Looss, 1899
- Cercarioides Witenberg, 1929
- Condylocotyla Pearson & Prevot, 1985
- Cryptocotyle Lühe, 1899
- Dermocystis Stafford, 1905
- Dexiogonimus
- Euryhelmis
- Galactosomum Looss, 1899
- Haplorchis Looss, 1899
- Haplorchoides Chen, 1949
- Heterophyes Cobbold, 1866
- Heterophyopsis Tubangui & Africa, 1938
- Heterotestophyes Leonov, 1957
- Irinaia Caballero & Bravo-Hollis, 1966
- Metagonimus Katsurada, 1912
- Metagonimoides
- Neostictodora Sogandares-Bernal, 1959
- Opisthometra Poche, 1926
- Pandiontrema Oshmarin, 1963
- Phocitrema Goto & Ozaki, 1930
- Phocitremoides Martin, 1950
- Pholeter Odhner, 1915
- Procerovum Onji & Nishio, 1916
- Protoheterophyes Pearson, 2002
- Pseudogalactosoma Yamaguti, 1942
- Pseudopygidiopsis Yamaguti, 1971
- Pygidiopsis Looss, 1907
- Pygidiopsoides Martin, 1951
- Scaphanocephalus Jägerskiöld, 1903
- Sonkulitrema Ablasov & Chibichenko, 1960
- Stellantchasmus Onji & Nishio, 1916
- Stictodora Looss, 1899
- Taphrogonymus Cohn, 1904
- Telogaster
- Tetracladium Kulachkova, 1954
