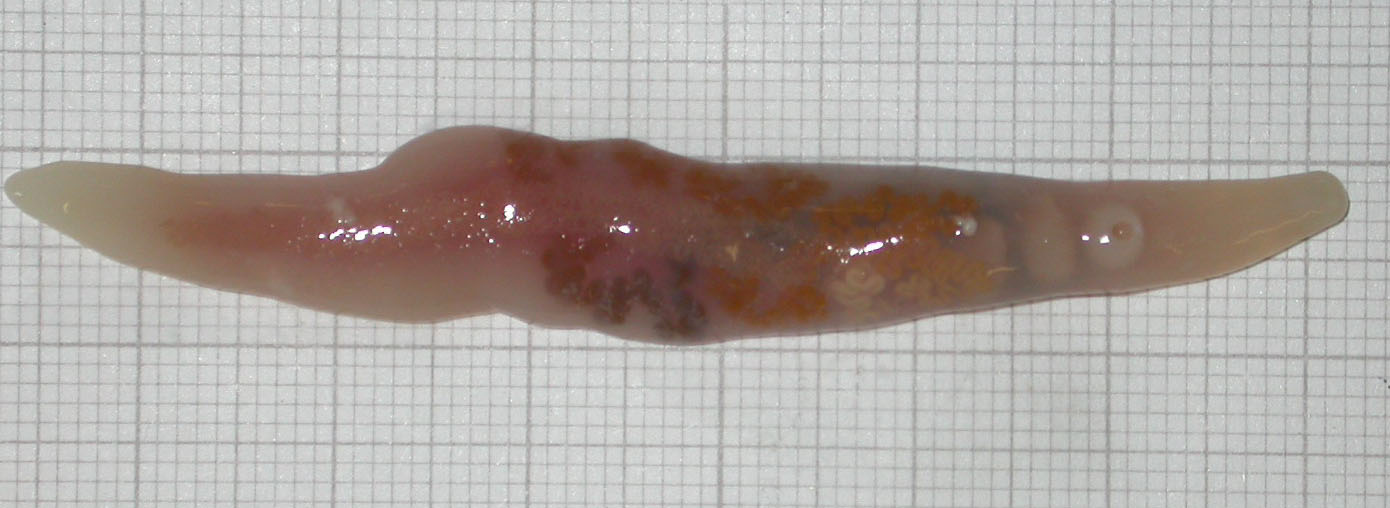
- Botulus microporus, a giant digenean parasite from the intestine of a lancetfish

Scientific classification
- Kingdom: Animalia
- Phylum: Platyhelminthes
- Superclass: Neodermata
- Class: Trematoda; Rudolphi, 1808

Subclasses
- Aspidogastrea; Digenea

= Trematoda =

Class of parasitic flatworms

Trematoda is a class of flatworms known as trematodes, and commonly as flukes. They are obligate internal parasites with a complex life cycle requiring at least two hosts. The intermediate host, in which asexual reproduction occurs, is a mollusk, usually a snail. The definitive host, where the flukes sexually reproduce, is a vertebrate. Infection by trematodes can cause disease in all five vertebrate groups: mammals, birds, amphibians, reptiles, and fish.

== Etymology ==
Trematodes are commonly referred to as flukes. This term can be traced back to the Old English name for flounder, and refers to the flattened, rhomboidal shape of the organisms. The etymology of trematode stems from the Greek word trēmatṓdēs, which means "pierced with holes", and refers to the worm's sucker, which pierces a hole in the host while the worm is attached and feeding.

== Taxonomy ==
There are 18,000 to 24,000 known species of trematodes, divided into two subclasses—the Aspidogastrea and the Digenea. Aspidogastrea is the smaller subclass, comprising 61 species. These flukes mainly infect bivalves and bony fishes. Digenea—which comprise the majority of trematodes—are found in certain mollusks and vertebrates.

== Trematodes of medical importance ==
Flukes that cause disease in humans are often classified based on the organ system they infect such as the blood, liver, lungs, and intestines:

=== Blood flukes ===
Blood flukes inhabit the blood in some stages of their life cycle. Blood flukes that cause disease in humans include Trichobilharzia regenti, which causes swimmer's itch, and seven species of genus Schistosoma which cause schistosomiasis: S. guineensis, S.haematobium, S. intercalatum, S. japonicum, S. malayensis, S. mansoni, S. mekongi. As a definitive host, humans are infected when the cercariae (the larval forms of trematodes) penetrate the skin. Any contact with water containing these cercariae can potentially result in infection. Adult blood flukes can live for years in human or animal reservoir hosts. S. haematobium and S. japonicum are of particular importance, as these are carcinogenic parasites. S. haematobium, which infects the urinary bladder, is among the most important causes of bladder cancer in humans. This organism is classified by the International Agency for Research on Cancer (IARC) as a Group 1 (extensively proven) carcinogen. S. japonicum is associated with the development of liver cancer, and is classified as a Group 2B (possibly carcinogenic to humans) carcinogen.

=== Liver flukes ===
Liver flukes are commonly found within bile ducts, liver, and gallbladder in certain mammalian and avian species. They include Clonorchis sinensis, Dicrocoelium dendriticum, Dicrocoelium hospes, Fasciola gigantica, Fasciola hepatica, Opisthorchis felineus, and Opisthorchis viverrini. Clonorchis and Opisthorchis are carcinogenic parasites that are strongly associated with the development of cancer of the bile ducts.

=== Lung flukes ===
Lung flukes: there are ten species of lung flukes that infect humans, causing paragonimiasis. Of these, the most common cause of human paragonimiasis is Paragonimus westermani, the oriental lung fluke. Lung flukes require three different hosts in order to complete their life cycle. The first intermediate host is a snail, the second intermediate host is a crab or crayfish, and the definitive host for lung flukes is a human or other animal.

=== Intestinal flukes ===
Intestinal flukes inhabit the epithelium of the small intestine. These include Fasciolopsis buski (which causes fasciolopsiasis), Metagonimus miyatai, Metagonimus takahashii, Metagonimus yokogawai (which cause metagonimiasis), and Heterophyes heterophyes and Heterophyes nocens (which cause heterophyiasis).

== Anatomy ==
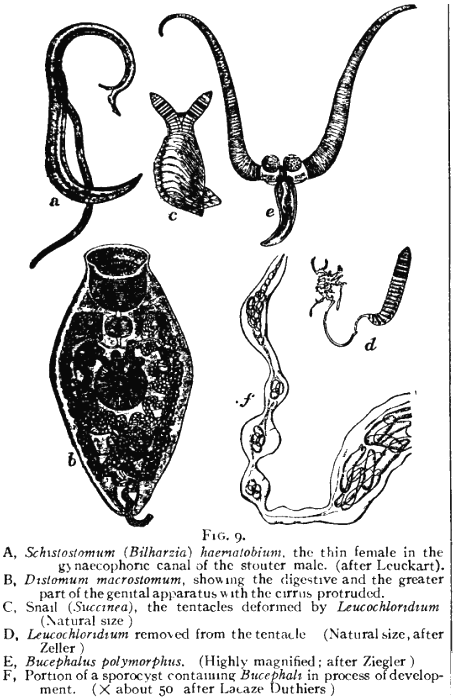
Various trematodes, from 1911 Encyclopædia Britannica

Trematodes are flattened oval or worm-like animals, usually no more than a few centimeters in length, although species as small as 1 millimetre (0.039 in) are known. Their most distinctive external feature is the presence of two suckers, one close to the mouth, and the other on the underside of the animal.

The body surface of trematodes comprises a tough syncytial tegument, which helps protect against digestive enzymes in those species that inhabit the gut of larger animals. It is also the surface of gas exchange; there are no respiratory organs.

The mouth is located at the forward end of the animal, and opens into a muscular, pumping pharynx. The pharynx connects, via a short oesophagus, to one or two blind-ending caeca, which occupy most of the length of the body. In some species, the caeca are themselves branched. As in other flatworms, there is no anus, and waste material must be egested through the mouth.

Although the excretion of nitrogenous waste occurs mostly through the tegument, trematodes do possess an excretory system, which is instead mainly concerned with osmoregulation. This consists of two or more protonephridia, with those on each side of the body opening into a collecting duct. The two collecting ducts typically meet up at a single bladder, opening to the exterior through one or two pores near the posterior end of the animal.

The brain consists of a pair of ganglia in the head region, from which two or three pairs of nerve cords run down the length of the body. The nerve cords running along the ventral surface are always the largest, while the dorsal cords are present only in the Aspidogastrea. Trematodes generally lack any specialized sense organs, although some ectoparasitic species do possess one or two pairs of simple ocelli.

Body wall musculature: Formed of three different muscle layers: circular, longitudinal, and diagonal. The outermost layer is formed by the circular muscle fibers, directly behind that are the longitudinal muscle fibers. The inner layer is formed by the diagonal muscle fibers. Together these muscle fibers form the segmented body wall of trematodes.

Oral sucker and acetabulum: In some species of Trematoda, such as T. bragai, there is an acetabulum. This saucer-shaped organ is attached to the oral sucker in some Trematodes and other parasitic worms. This allows for parasitic worms to attach to their host by penetrating the host's tissue with spines lining the acetabulum organ. In trematodes, the oral sucker is linked to the pharynx via a canal composed of meridional, equatorial, and radial muscle fibers. Together, the mouth, pharynx, and esophagus form the foregut in Trematodes.

=== Reproductive system of blood flukes ===
Most trematodes are hermaphrodites, as are many internal parasites. Blood flukes (Schistosoma) are the only form of trematodes that are dioecious (have both a male and female sex). Blood flukes are unique in the way that they can undergo both asexual and sexual reproduction. Asexual reproduction occurs in the hepatopancreas of a freshwater snail, which serves as an intermediate host. Sexual reproduction occurs later in the life cycle, in the definitive (vertebrate) host.

The male reproductive system usually includes two testes, though some species may have more. The testes are located posterior and dorsal to the ventral sucker. Spermatogenesis produces biflagellate sperm (sperm with two tails). Sperm is stored in the seminal vesicles, which are connected to the testes by the vas deferens. The male reproductive system varies considerably in structure between species; this can be very useful in species identification.

The female reproductive system consists of one ovary connected to an elongated uterus by a ciliated oviduct. The uterus opens to the exterior at the genital pore (the common external opening of the male and female reproductive systems). The location of the ovary varies among different species, making the female reproductive system useful in species identification. At the base of the oviduct is a copulatory duct—termed Laurer's canal—which is analogous to a vagina. Oocytes are released from the ovary into the oocapt (the dilated proximal end of the oviduct). Sperm cells travel from the seminal vesicles through the uterus to reach the ootype (the dilated distal part of the oviduct), where fertilization occurs. The ootype is connected via a pair of ducts to a number of vitelline ducts that produce yolk. After the egg is surrounded by yolk, its shell is formed from the secretions of Mehlis' glands, the ducts of which also open into the ootype. From the ootype, the fertilized egg then travels back into the uterus, and is ultimately released from the genital atrium.

== Life cycles ==
Trematodes have a very complex life cycle and depending on what taxa they belong to, their life cycles can be completed with as little as one host compared to the typical three hosts. When there is one host, this is normally a specific species of snail of the family Lymnaeidae. Almost all trematodes infect molluscs as the first host in the life cycle, and most have a complex life cycle involving other hosts. Most trematodes are monoecious and alternately reproduce sexually and asexually. The two main exceptions to this are the Aspidogastrea, which have no asexual reproduction, and the schistosomes, which are dioecious.

In the definitive host, in which sexual reproduction occurs, eggs are commonly shed along with host feces. Eggs shed in water release free-swimming larval forms (Miracidia) that are infective to the intermediate host, in which asexual reproduction occurs.

A species that exemplifies the remarkable life history of the trematodes is the bird fluke, Leucochloridium paradoxum. The definitive hosts, in which the parasite reproduces, are various woodland birds, while the hosts in which the parasite multiplies (intermediate host) are various species of snail. The adult parasite in the bird's gut produces eggs and these eventually end up on the ground in the bird's feces. Some eggs may be swallowed by a snail and hatch into larvae (miracidia). These larvae grow and take on a sac-like appearance. This stage is known as the sporocyst and it forms a central body in the snail's digestive gland that extends into a brood sac in the snail's head, muscular foot and eye-stalks. It is in the central body of the sporocyst where the parasite replicates itself, producing many tiny embryos (redia). These embryos move to the brood sac and mature into cercaria.

=== Life cycle adaptations ===
Trematodes have a large variation of forms throughout their life cycles. Individual trematode parasites life cycles may vary from this list. They have five larval stages along with the cystic and fully matured adult phases.

1. Trematodes are released from the definitive host as eggs, which have evolved to withstand the harsh environment
2. Released from the egg which hatches into the miracidium. This infects the first intermediate host in one of two ways, either active or passive transmission. The first host is normally a mollusk. a) Active transmission has adapted for dispersal in space as a free swimming ciliated miracidium with adaptations for recognizing and penetrating the first intermediate host. b) Passive transmission has adapted for dispersal in time and infects the first intermediate host contained within the egg.
3. The sporocyst forms inside the snail first intermediate host and feeds through diffusion across the tegument.
4. The rediae also forms inside the snail first intermediate host and feeds through a developed pharynx. Either the rediae or the sporocyst develops into the cercariae through polyembryony in the snail.
5. The cercariae are adapted for dispersal in space and exhibit a large variety in morphology. They are adapted to recognize and penetrate the second intermediate host, and contain behavioral and physiological adaptations not present in earlier life stages.
6. The metacercariae are an adapted cystic form dormant in the secondary intermediate host.
7. The adult is the fully developed form which infects the definitive host.

The first stage is the miracidium that is triangular in shape and covered by a ciliated ectoderm which is the outermost layer of the three germ layers. The epidermis and epidemic tissues of the parasite will develop from the miracidium. They also have an anterior spin which helps them drill into the snail. The miracidium develops into the sporocyst, which is a sac-like structure, and in this sac the larvae begin to develop. The cells multiply. The rediae and cercariae develop from the larvae which are then released and encyst as metacercariae, for instance on aquatic plants. Humans as well as larger sea creatures get infected when they eat these plants.

When they infect humans, it can take 3–4 months for the metacercariae to mature into adult flukes and lay eggs.

==== Example: liver flukes ====
Liver flukes, one of the different species, are responsible for causing liver fluke disease which is also known as fasciolosis. They are hermaphroditic internal parasites. They are caused by the migration of a large number of immature flukes through the liver passageway or by adult flukes that migrate to the bile ducts. Liver flukes infect all grazing animals and infect humans when they eat raw or undercooked fish.

Like other flukes, the liver flukes need intermediate hosts and as a result, the transmission from animals to humans happens in three phases. The first phase is the infection of the snail (the first intermediate host) via feces. They complete their gestation and hatch as cercariae. They leave their snail hosts and infect fish who are their second intermediate host. Lastly, larger animals ingest the metacercariae in raw and undercooked fish. In humans or grazing animals, the metacercariae complete their life cycle and become full grown liver flukes.

=== Eusociality ===
One species of trematoda, Haplorchis pumilio, has evolved eusociality involving a colony of them creating a class of sterile soldiers. One fluke invades a host and establishes a colony of dozens to thousands of clones that work together to take it over. Since rival trematode species might also invade and replace them, a specialized caste of sterile soldier trematodes protects the colony.

Soldiers are smaller, more mobile, and develop along a different pathway than sexually mature reproductives. One big difference is their mouthparts (pharynx), which are five times as big as those of the reproductives. They make up nearly a quarter of the volume of the soldier. These soldiers do not have a germinal mass, cannot metamorphose to be reproductive, and are, therefore, obligately sterile.

Soldiers are readily distinguished from the immature and mature reproductive worms. Soldiers are more aggressive than reproductives, attacking heterospecific trematodes that infect their host in vitro. H. pumilio soldiers do not attack conspecifics from other colonies.

The soldiers are not evenly distributed throughout the host body. They're found in the highest numbers in the basal visceral mass, where competing trematodes tend to multiply during the early phase of infection. This strategic positioning allows them to effectively defend against invaders, similar to how soldier distribution patterns are seen in other animals with defensive castes.

They "appear to be an obligately sterile physical caste, akin to that of the most advanced social insects".

== Infections ==
Trematodes can cause disease in many types of vertebrates, including mammals, birds, reptiles, and fish. Cattle and sheep can become infected by eating contaminated food. These infections lead to a reduction in milk or meat production, which can be of significant economic importance to the livestock industry.

Human trematode infections are most common in Asia, Africa and Latin America. However, trematodes can be found anywhere where untreated human waste is used as fertilizer. Humans can be infected by trematodes by immersion in or ingestion of contaminated water, or by consuming raw or undercooked contaminated animals or plants.

=== Treatment ===
Albendazole can be used to treat clonorchiasis and opisthorchiasis. Triclabendazole is often used to treat fasciolosis, and may also be useful in the treatment of paragonimiasis and dicrocoeliasis. Praziquantel is effective in the treatment of all diseases caused by flukes (clonorchiasis, dicrocoeliasis, echinostomiasis, fasciolopsiasis, fasciolosis, gastrodiscoidiasis, heterophyiasis, metagonimiasis, opisthorchiasis, paragonimiasis, and schistosomiasis).
