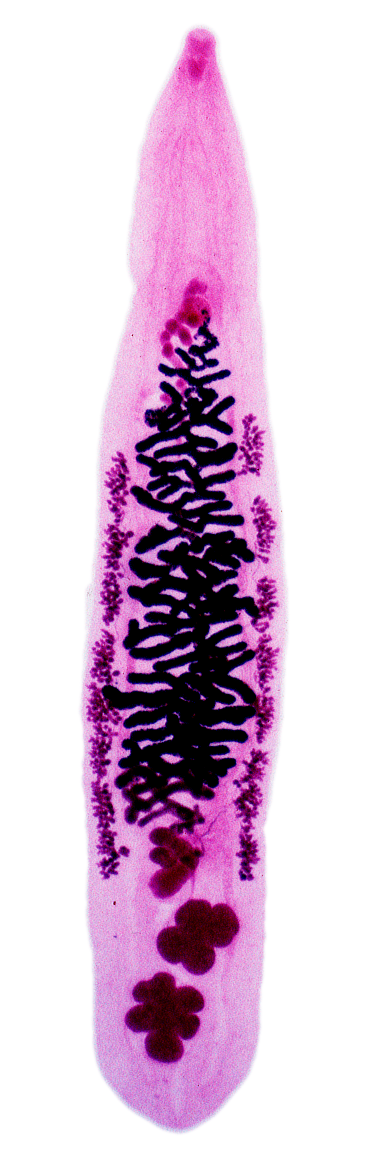
- An adult Opisthorchis viverrini showing (from top) oral sucker, pharynx, caecum, ventral sucker, vitellaria, uterus, ovary, Mehlis gland, testes, excretory bladder.

Scientific classification
- Kingdom: Animalia
- Phylum: Platyhelminthes
- Class: Trematoda
- Order: Plagiorchiida
- Family: Opisthorchiidae
- Genus: Opisthorchis
- Species: O. viverrini

Binomial name
- Opisthorchis viverrini (Poirier, 1886) Stiles & Hassal, 1896

Synonyms
- Distoma viverrini Poirier, 1886

= Opisthorchis viverrini =

Species of fluke

Opisthorchis viverrini, common name Southeast Asian liver fluke, is a food-borne trematode parasite from the family Opisthorchiidae that infects the bile duct. People are infected after eating raw or undercooked fish. Infection with the parasite is called opisthorchiasis. O. viverrini infection also increases the risk of cholangiocarcinoma, a cancer of the bile ducts.

A small, leaf-like fluke, O. viverrini completes its lifecycle in three different animals. Snails of the species Bithynia are the first intermediate hosts, fish belonging to the family Cyprinidae are the second intermediate host, and the definitive hosts are humans and other mammals such as dogs, cats, rats, and pigs. It was first discovered in the Indian fishing cat (Prionailurus viverrus) by M.J. Poirier in 1886. The first human case was discovered by Robert Thomson Leiper in 1915.

O. viverrini (together with Clonorchis sinensis and Opisthorchis felineus) is one of the three most medically important species in the family Opisthorchiidae. In fact O. viverrini and C. sinensis are capable of causing cancer in humans, and are classified by the International Agency for Research on Cancer as a group 1 biological carcinogen in 2009. O. viverrini is found in Thailand, the Laos, Vietnam, and Cambodia. It is most widely distributed in northern Thailand, with high prevalence in humans, while central Thailand has a low rate of prevalence.

== Discovery ==
O. viverrini was first described by a French parasitologist Jules Poirier in 1886, who discovered the parasite in an Indian fishing cat (Prionailurus viverrus), originally from Southeast Asia, that died in the Zoological Gardens attached to the National Museum of Natural History in Paris. He named it Distomum viverrini. American parasitologists Charles Wardell Stiles and Albert Hassall redescribed it and assigned it to the existing genus Opisthorchis (created by a French zoologist Raphaël Blanchard) in 1891. The first human specimen was described by a British parasitologist Robert Thomson Leiper in 1915, but without knowing the exact parasite. (He simply reported it as "Notes of the occurrence of parasites presumably rare in man.") Leiper received the specimens from an Irish medical doctor, Arthur Francis George Kerr, who had collected them from the post mortem examination of two prisoners at a jail in Chiang Mai, northern Thailand. In the next year, Kerr himself reported from investigation of 230 male prisoners that 39 (17 percent) of them had the infection. Kerr initially misidentified the parasite as O. felineus, an already known human parasite, because of their close resemblance. C. Prommas also reported O. felineus in 1927 from an autopsy of a 17-year-old Thai male residing in Roi Et, northeast Thailand. It was in 1955 when Elvio H. Sadun from the U. S. Public Health Service analysed the cases of opisthorchiasis in Thailand and concluded that all the infections were due to O. viverrini. A systematic comparison in 1965 confirmed the differences from O. felineus.

== Description ==
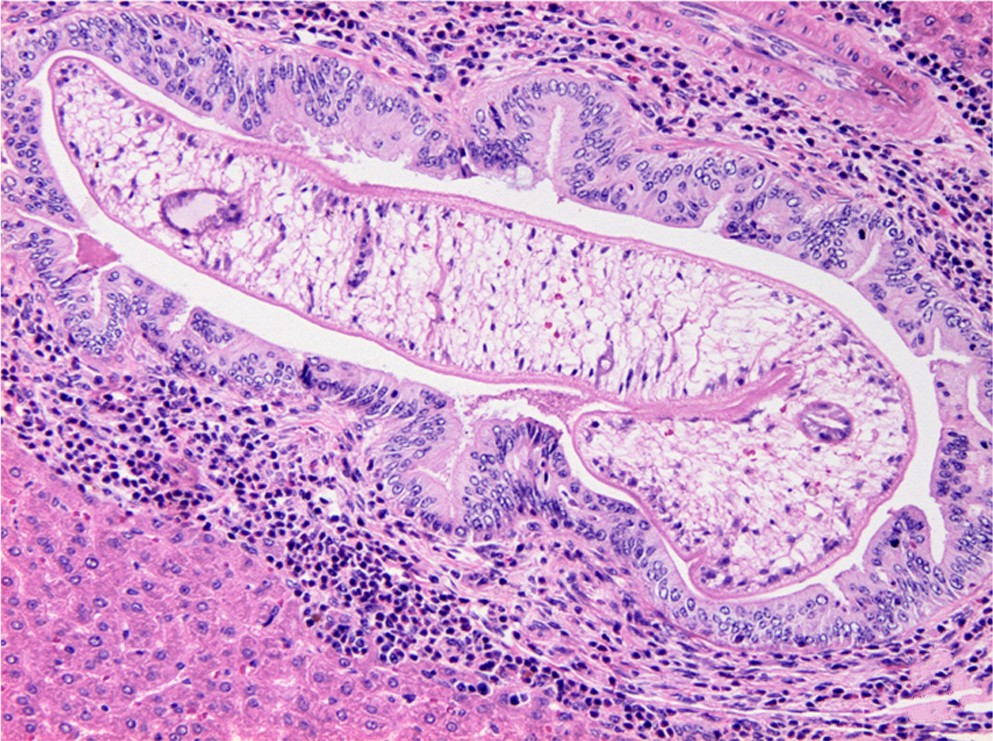
Photomicrograph of an adult O. viverrini in bile ducts of experimentally infected hamster

An egg of O. viverrini. 400× magnification.

Structurally, O. viverrini is basically similar to C. sinensis and O. felineus, but it is slightly smaller than the two flukes. The body of an adult O. viverrini is flat (dorsoventrally flattened) like a leaf, shaped like a lancet, and can be seen through (transparent). They are monoecious, so no male or female individuals exist; each fluke has the complete sets of both male and female reproductive systems. A typical individual is 7 mm long and 1.5 mm wide. The anterior end is more pointed and marked by a mouth-like structure called oral sucker. About 1.5 mm behind the oral sucker is a similar structure called ventral sucker. These suckers are the organs of attachment. Two testes are seen towards the posterior end. The testes are lobed in contrast to the branched (dendritic) testes of C.sinensis. It is connected to the seminal vesicle, which is a coiled tube running up to the ejaculatory duct, which in turn opens through a small opening called genital pore just in front of the ventral sucker. Two ovaries are situated in front of the testes, and they form several lobes. The uterus runs along the ejaculatory duct and opens at the genital pore. A sac-like S-shaped tube called excretory bladder is between the two testes. The remaining body spaces are mostly occupied by a highly branched glandular organ called vitellaria (often called vitelline glands). Unlike the anterior end, the posterior end is rounded.

The eggs of O. viverrini are 30 × 12 μm in size and they are slightly narrower and more regularly ovoid than in C. sinensis. The eggs are visually indistinguishable in Kato technique smears from other eggs of flukes from other fluke family Heterophyidae.

The infective larvae, metacercariae, of O. viverrini are brownish and elliptical, with two nearly equal-sized suckers – the oral sucker and the ventral sucker. They are 0.19–0.25 × 0.15–0.22 mm in size.

== Lifecycle ==
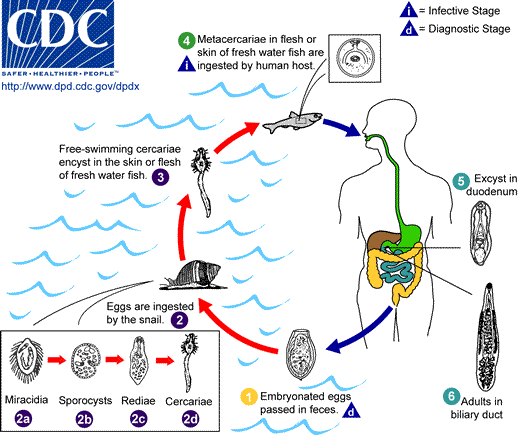
Lifecycle of Opisthorchis

O. viverrini is a hermaphroditic liver fluke. Similar to C. sinensis and O. felineus, it requires three different hosts to complete its lifecycle. Freshwater snails are the first intermediate hosts in which asexual reproduction takes place, and freshwater fishes belonging to the family Cyprinidae are second intermediate hosts in which larval development occurs. Fish–eating (piscivorous) mammals, including humans, dogs, and cats, act as definitive hosts, in which sexual reproduction occurs. As a result of poor sanitation practices and inadequate sewerage infrastructure, O. viverrini-infected people pass the trematode's eggs in their feces into bodies of fresh water from where snails become infected.

=== First intermediate host ===
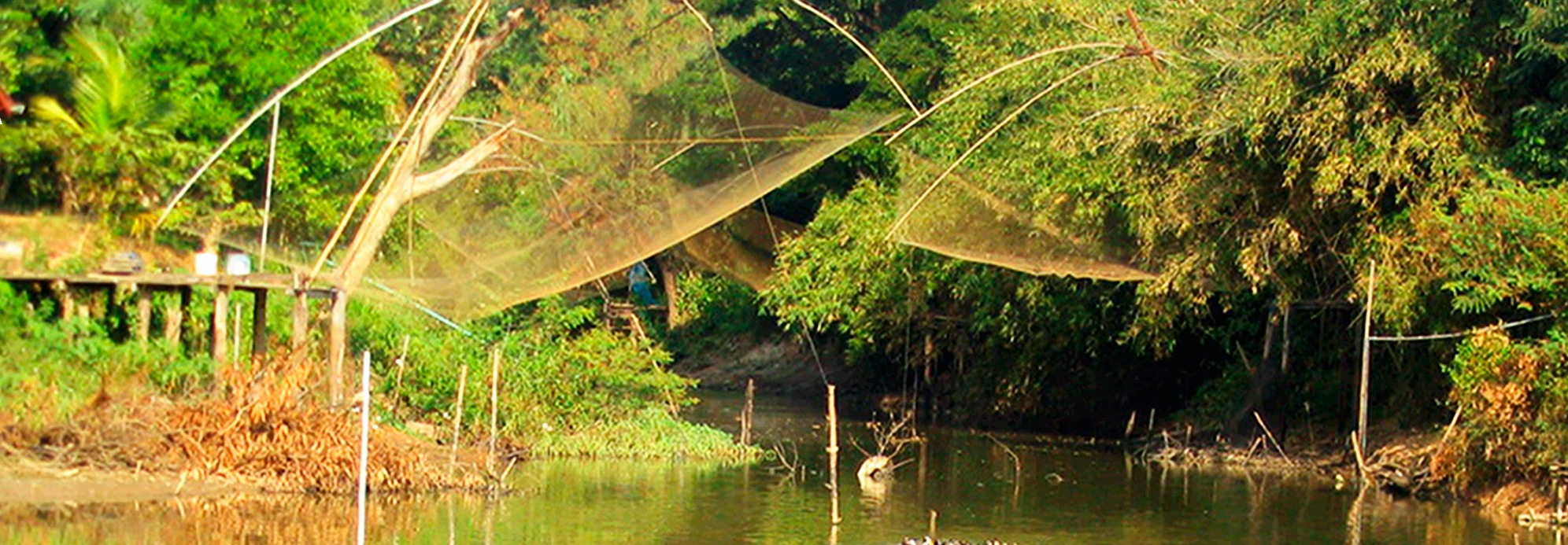
Fluke-infected fish are plentiful in rivers such as the Chi River in Khon Kaen Province, Thailand.

The first intermediate hosts include freshwater snails of the genus Bithynia. The only known host is Bithynia siamensis (that include all its three subspecies). Snails are infected by the free-swimming larvae called miracidia in water bodies where faecal matters of infected mammals are deposited. Inside the snail tissue, the miracidia grow into sporocysts, that contain spore-like daughter cells. The daughter cells called rediae multiply and develop into numerous larvae called cercariae. Each cercaria has a large head and a long tail. The cercariae escape from the snail and enter the water body again as free-swimming larvae. Their tails act as a propeller for swimming and they actively search for a fish host.

=== Second intermediate host ===
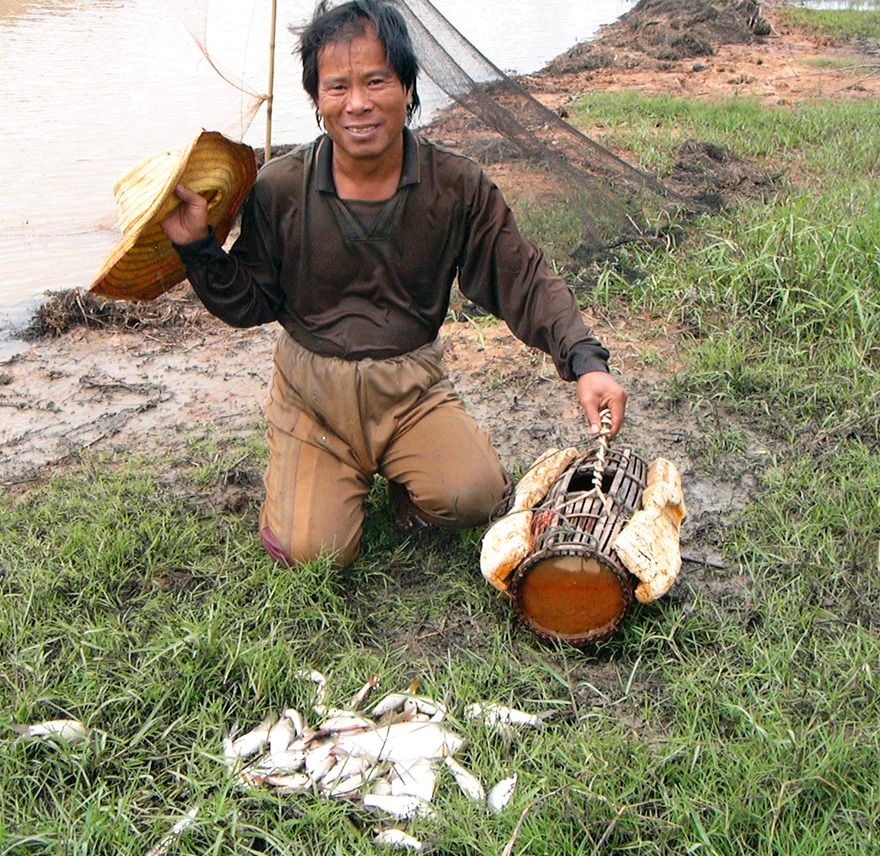
Thai fishermen catch fish (including infected ones) in nets and prepare fish-based meals with local herbs, spices, and condiments.

The cercaria then locates a cyprinoid fish, encysts in the fins, skin, and musculature of the fish, and becomes a metacercaria. Habitats of second intermediate hosts of O. viverrini include freshwater habitats with stagnant or slow-moving waters (ponds, river, aquaculture, swamps, rice fields).

In 1965, nine fish hosts of O. viverrini were known. Up to 2002, 15 species of fishes from seven genera of the family Cyprinidae were known to serve as second intermediate host. Further research by Rim et al. (2008) showed an additional five host species. The known hosts include Puntius brevis, P. gonionotus, P. orphoides, P. proctozysron, P. viehoeveri, Hampala dispar, H. macrolepidota, Cyclocheilichthys armatus, C. repasson, Labiobarbus lineatus, Esomus metallicus, Mystacoleucus marginatus, Puntioplites falcifer, Onychostoma elongatum, Osteochilus hasseltii, Hypsibarbus lagleri, and Barbodes gonionotus.

=== Definitive host ===
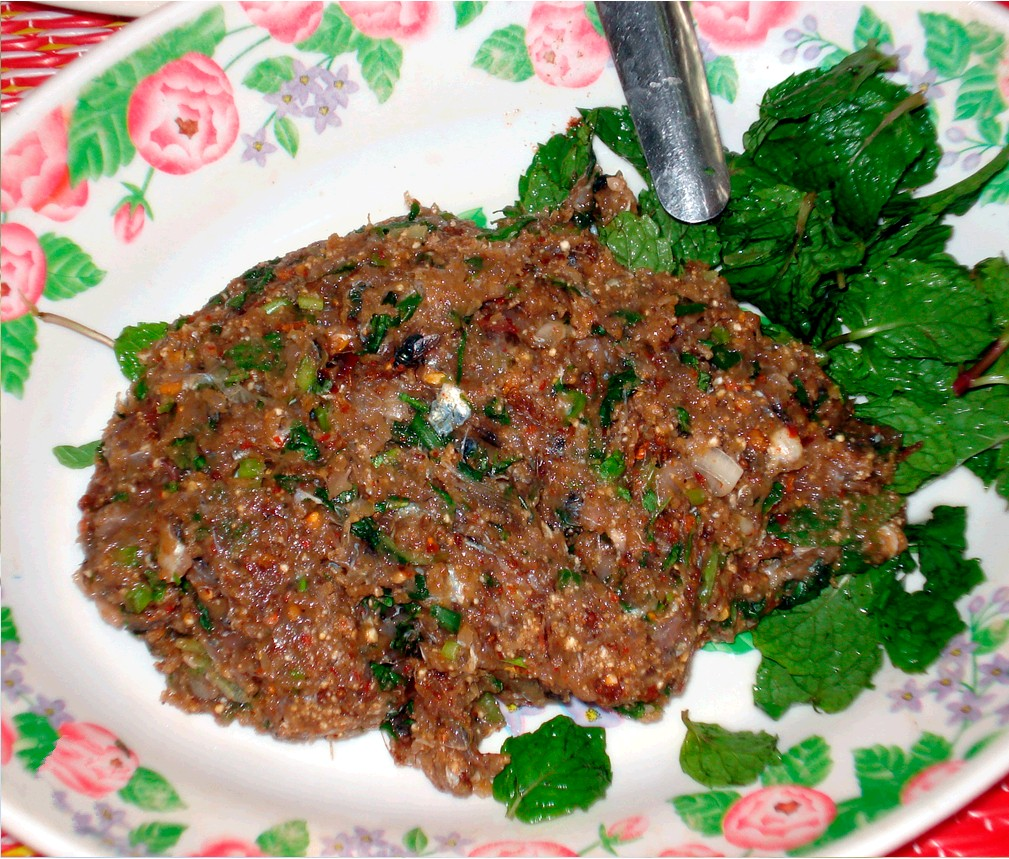
The finished dish of koi pla made of raw fish accompanied by rice and vegetables. This dish is a dietary staple of many northeastern Thai villagers and is a common source of infection with O. viverrini.

The metacercarial stage is infective to humans and other fish-eating mammals, including dogs, cats, rats, and pigs. Fish contain more metacercaria from September to February, before the dry season, and this is when humans are usually infected. Infection is acquired when people ingest raw or undercooked fish. Dishes of raw fish are common in the cuisine of Laos and the cuisine of Thailand: koi pla, raw fish in spicy salad larb pla, salted semifermented fish dishes called pla ra, pla som and som fak. The natural definitive host is the leopard cat (Prionailurus bengalensis). The young adult worm escapes from the metacercarial cyst in the upper small intestine and then migrates through the ampulla of Vater into the biliary tree, where it develops to sexual maturity over 4–6 weeks, thus completing the lifecycle.

The adult worms primarily live in the bile duct, gall bladder, and sometimes in the pancreatic duct. Although they are hermaphrodites, reproduction is by cross fertilization (two individuals exchanging their gametes). Fertilized eggs are laid in the bile duct and are discharged along the bile juice into the intestine, and finally released in the environment along with the faeces. An individual fluke may shed as many as 200 eggs in a day. The exact lifespan is not known, but is estimated to be more than 25 years.

== Prevalence ==
O. viverrini remains a major public health problem in the Mekong Basin in Southeast Asia. It is endemic in Thailand, the Lao People's Democratic Republic, Vietnam, and Cambodia. It is most prevalent in Thailand, and for this reason Thailand has the highest incidence of opisthorchiasis-associated cancer, cholangiocarcinoma (CCA) in the world. About 9.6% of the total population of Thailand is estimated to be infected. It is most abundant in northern Thailand, while it occurs moderately in central Thailand. According to the five-year national survey from 2010 to 2015, the highest incidence reached up to 45.7% of the population in northern Thailand. However, there is no record of opisthorchiasis due to O. viverrini in southern Thailand. School children are most infected, and the infection was very high before 1984, after which there was mass treatment programme, and the prevalence sharply declined after 1994. A national survey in Lao PDR (under the project of Korea-Laos Collaborative Project for Control of Foodborne Trematode Infections in Lao PDR) between 2007 and 2011 indicates that it is the most prevalent helminth infection, amounting to 55.6% of the infection. It is not highly prevalent in Vietnam, but accurate survey is difficult because it is often co-infected with other flukes such as Haplorchis pumilio, H. taichui, and C. sinensis. It is most abundant in the northern provinces. It is least prevalent in Cambodia. A national survey between 2006 and 2011 showed that it is the second most prevalent helminth accounting for 5.7% of the total infection, after hookworm with 9.6% of the infection.

== Effect on human health ==
Generally, opisthorchiasis due to O. viverrini is harmless without any clinical symptoms. Mild symptoms may appear such as dyspepsia, abdominal pain, constipation, or diarrhoea. However, under severe infection, enlargement of liver (hepatomegaly) and malnutrition are observed. In rare cases, cholangitis, cholecystitis, and cholangiocarcinoma can also develop. In humans, O. viverrini inhabits mainly the bile ducts, and rarely, the gall bladder and pancreatic duct. Heavy infection can produce problems in the liver, gall bladder, and bile ducts. The bile ducts of heavily infected patients are usually dilated and indicate fibrosis. Pathological effects on the bile ducts include inflammation, epithelial desquamation, goblet-cell metaplasia, epithelial and adenomatous hyperplasia, and periductal fibrosis. The collective effects in addition to specific parasite secretion and the host's immune reactions account for the development of cholangiocarcinoma. The infection is not immediately life-threatening; cancer develops after 30–40 years, but death occurs very fast, within 3–6 months of diagnosis.

Medical care and loss of wages caused by O. viverrini in Laos and in Thailand costs about US$120 million annually, primarily in northeast Thailand.

Infections with O. viverrini and of other liver flukes in Asia affect the poor and poorest people. Opisthorchiasis has received less attention in comparison to other diseases, and it is a neglected disease in Asia. There is no approved drug for the infection; however, Swiss researchers have tested tribendimidine and achieved a 70% cure rate. Surgery and supportive treatment are complicated and generally unavailable in the endemic areas. A general trematocide praziquantel is used for the infection, but is not technically recommended. In addition to praziquantel other commonly used anthelmintics such as albendazole, artesunate, and miltefosine are found to be effective on the cercariae but not on the metacercariae. Its ability to cause cancer is worsened by the discovery that its infection is often associated with those of Helicobacter species (including H. pylori, which is primarily associated with ulcers, but also may cause stomach cancers).

== Genetics ==
O. viverrini has 12 (six pairs) of chromosomes, i.e. 2n = 12. The draft genome and transcriptomes were published in 2014. Its genome is 634.5 MB in size. The species has 16,379 protein-coding genes.

== See also ==
- The Integrated Opisthorchiasis Control Program
