= Banchob Sripa =

Thai scientist (born 1958)

- บรรจบ ศรีภา
- Banchob in 2015
- Born: 4 December 1958 (age 67); Muang Sam Sip, Ubon Ratchathani, Thailand
- Education: University of Queensland; Mahidol University; Khon Kaen University
- Awards: Thailand Outstanding Scientist Award (2013); Thailand Research Fund Senior Research Scholar (2013)
- Scientific career
- Fields: Tropical Medicine; Parasitology
- Workplaces: Faculty of Medicine, Khon Kaen University

Banchob Sripa (Thai: บรรจบ ศรีภา, RTGS: Banchop Sipa; born 4 December 1958) is a Thai scientist who is professor and Director of the Tropical Disease Research Center (TDRC) at Khon Kaen University in Khon Kaen, Thailand. He is also the head of the World Health Organization Collaborating Centre for Research and Control of Opisthorchiasis, an infectious parasitic disease caused by the Southeast Asian liver fluke, which is endemic in northeastern Thailand and other portions of the Mekong River basin. He is also coordinator for the Asian Neglected Tropical Disease Network. He has a doctorate in tropical health from the University of Queensland, Australia. He received the Outstanding Scientist Award from the Foundation for the Promotion of Science and Technology in 2013.

== The Lawa model ==
An opisthorchiasis control program known as the "Lawa model" was started in 2007 by the Tropical Disease Research Laboratory (TDRL) under Banchob. Using an EcoHealth approach, the program has been more successful than earlier control programs. The program operates in 12 villages surrounding the Lawa Lake south of Khon Kaen. The liver fluke infection rate has declined to less than 10 percent from an average of 60 percent since the start of the program. Banchob has published more than 200 peer-reviewed scientific articles and eight book chapters in English.
