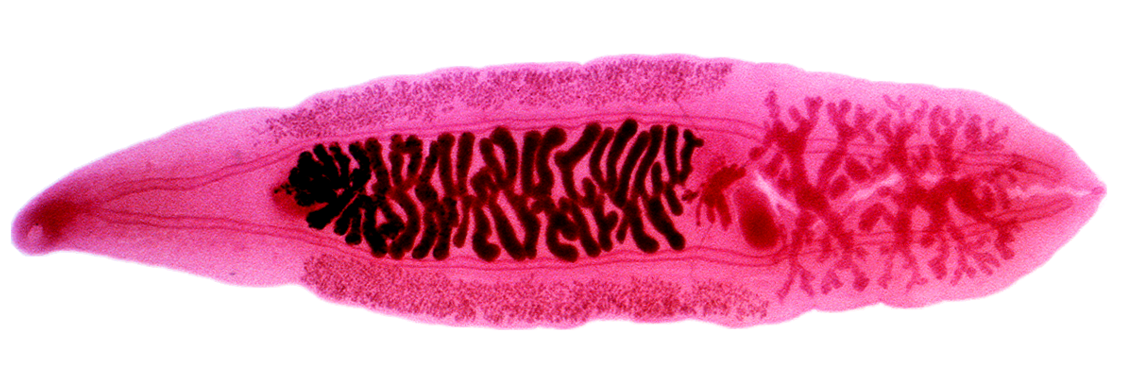
- An adult Clonorchis sinensis has these main body parts: oral sucker, pharynx, caecum, ventral sucker, vitellaria, uterus, ovary, Mehlis' gland, testes, excretory bladder. (H&E stain)

Scientific classification
- Kingdom: Animalia
- Phylum: Platyhelminthes
- Class: Trematoda
- Order: Plagiorchiida
- Family: Opisthorchiidae
- Genus: Clonorchis
- Species: C. sinensis

Binomial name
- Clonorchis sinensis Looss, 1907

= Clonorchis sinensis =

Species of fluke

Clonorchis sinensis, the Chinese liver fluke, is a liver fluke belonging to the class Trematoda, phylum Platyhelminthes. It infects fish-eating mammals, including humans. In humans, it infects the common bile duct and gall bladder, feeding on bile. It was discovered by British physician James McConnell at the Medical College Hospital in Calcutta (Kolkata) in 1874. The first description was given by Thomas Spencer Cobbold, who named it Distoma sinense. The fluke passes its lifecycle in three different hosts, namely freshwater snail as first intermediate hosts, freshwater fish as second intermediate host, and mammals as definitive hosts.

Endemic to Asia and Russia, C. sinensis is the most prevalent human fluke in Asia and third-most in the world. It is still actively transmitted in China, Japan, Korea, Russia, and Vietnam. Most infections (about 85%) occur in China. The infection, called clonorchiasis, generally appears as jaundice, indigestion, biliary inflammation, bile duct obstruction, and even liver cirrhosis, cholangiocarcinoma, and hepatic carcinoma.

As a major causative agent of bile duct cancer, the International Agency for Research on Cancer has classified C. sinensis as a group 1 biological carcinogen in 2009.

== Discovery ==
The symptoms of C. sinensis infection (clonorchiasis) have been known from ancient times in China. The earliest record is from corpses buried in 278 BC at Jiangling County of Hubei Province and the Warring States tomb of the western Han Dynasty. The parasite was discovered only in 1874, though, by James McConnell, a professor of pathology and resident physician at the Medical College Hospital in Calcutta. He recovered the fluke from a 20-year-old Chinese carpenter who died on 8 September 1874. On autopsy, he observed that the corpse had a swollen liver (hepatomegaly) and distended bile ducts, which he noted were blocked by "small, dark, vermicular-looking bodies." He recovered the vermicules (worms) and compared them with known flukes Fasciola hepatica and Distoma lanceolatum. He concluded that the new fluke was significantly different. He published his observations in the 21 August 1875 issue of The Lancet.

The formal scientific description was published in 1875 by Thomas Spencer Cobbold, who named it Distoma sinense. In 1876, Rudolf Leuckart named it Distomum spithulatum. Kenso Ishisaka recorded the first case of clonorchiasis in Japan in 1877. McConnell identified another infection in a Chinese cook from Hong Kong in 1878. Erwin von Baelz reported the presence of similar flukes from an autopsy of a Japanese patient at Tokyo University in 1883. He recorded two different forms, naming the smaller, more pathogenic form as Distoma hepatis endemicum sive perniciosum, and the larger, less pathogenic form as D.h.e.s. innocuum. Isao Ijima correctly redescribed them as the same species, but still wrongly renamed it Distoma endemicum in 1886. When a new genus Opisthorchis was created by Émile Blanchard in 1895, Cobbold's species name D. sinense was moved to the new genus because of close similarities with the other members. Further analyses by Arthur Looss, though, showed significant differences from the general features of Opisthorchis, particularly on the highly branched testes. He created a new genus Clonorchis (from Greek klon meaning "twig/branch", orkhis meaning "testis") in 1907. Similar to Baelz, he differentiated the larger species as Clonorchis sinensis, which is mostly found in China, and the smaller species as C. endemicum, found mostly in Japan. In 1912, Harujiro Kobayashi corrected the classification that the differences in sizes were due to the nature of the host and intensity of infection, and had nothing to do with the biology. Hence, he supported only C. sinensis. Kobayashi was also the first to discover fish as the second intermediate host in 1911. Masatomo Muto discovered snails as the first intermediate host in 1918.

== Description ==
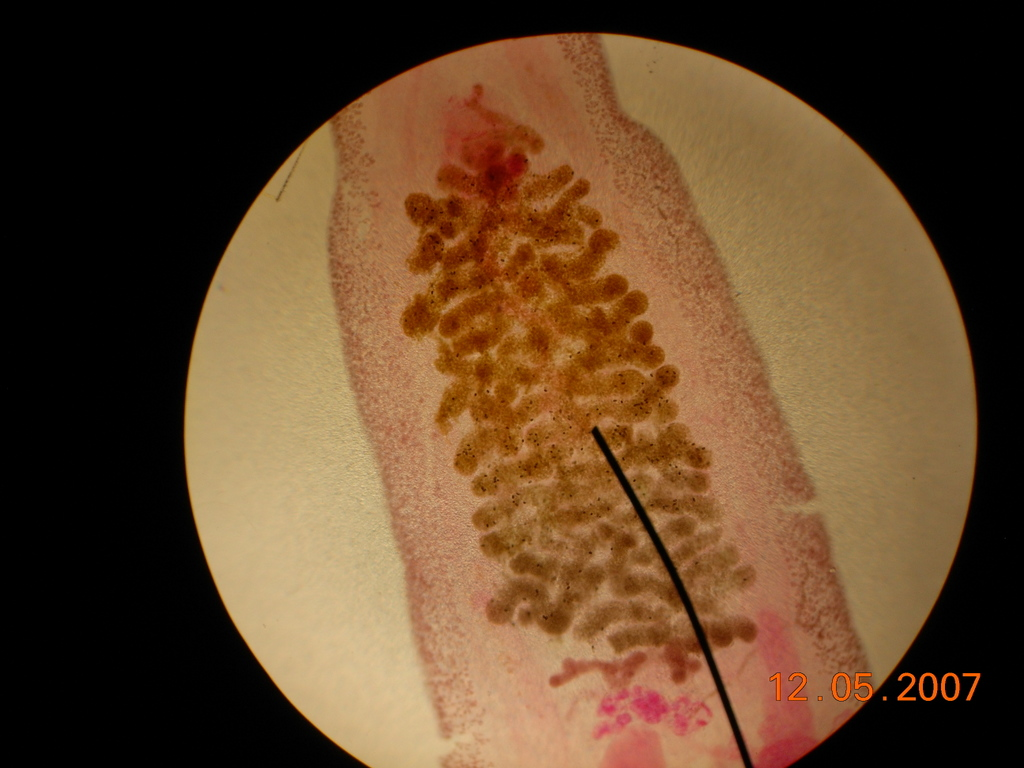
Clonorchis sinensis under a light microscope: Notice the uterus; this species is monoecious.

An adult C. sinensis is a flattened (dorsoventrally) and leaf-shaped fluke. The body is slightly elongated and slender, measuring 15–20 mm in length and 3–4 mm in width. It narrows at the anterior region into a small opening called the oral sucker, which act as the mouth. From the mouth, two tubes called caeca run the length of body. They are the digestive and excretory tracts. The posterior end is broad and blunt. A poorly developed ventral sucker lies behind the oral sucker, at about one-fourth of the body length from the anterior end. A common genital pore opens just in front of it. As a hermaphrodite, it has both male and female reproductive organs. A single rounded ovary is at the centre of the body, and two testes are towards the posterior end. The uterus from the ovary, and seminal ducts from the testes, meet and open at the genital pore. The testes are highly branched. Other highly branched organs called vitellaria (or vitelline glands) are distributed on either side of the body.

The eggs are similar to those of other related flukes such as Opisthorchis viverrini and O. felineus, and are often confused during diagnosis. They small and oval in shape, measuring about 30 x 15 μm in diameter. They are sharply curved and with a clear convex operculum towards the narrower end. At the broader end is a stem-shaped knob. The miracidium can be seen inside the fertilised egg.

== Life cycle ==
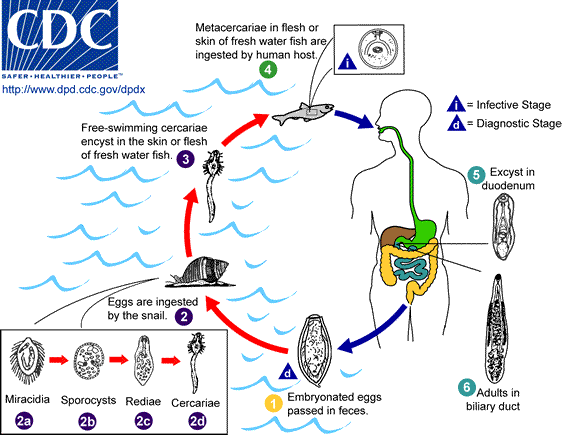
Lifecycle of C. sinensis

=== Production of eggs ===
The eggs of a C. sinensis are released through the biliary tract, and excreted out along with the faeces. The eggs are embryonated and contain the larvae called miracidia. Unlike most other flukes in which the miracidia undergo development and swim in water to infect suitable hosts, the eggs of C. sinensis are simply deposited in water. The eggs are then eaten by snails.

=== First intermediate host ===
Freshwater snail Parafossarulus manchouricus often serves as a first intermediate host for C. sinensis in China, Japan, Korea, and Russia. Other snail hosts include Alocinma longicornis, Bithynia longicornis, Bithynia fuchsiana, Bithynia misella, Parafossarulus anomalospiralis, Melanoides tuberculata, Semisulcospira cancellata, Koreoleptoxis amurensis, Semisulcospira libertina, and Assiminea lutea in China; and Melanoides tuberculata in Vietnam.

Once inside of the snail body, the embryonic membrane is dissolved by the snail's digestive enzymes, so the miracidium hatches from the egg. The ciliated miracidium can move about, penetrating the intestine, and enters the haemocoel and digestive gland. Here, it undergoes metamorphosis into a sporocyst. The sporocyst gives rise to small larvae called rediae. The rediae burst out from the sporocyst to become the next-stage larvae called cercaria. This system of asexual reproduction allows for an exponential multiplication of cercaria individuals from one miracidium. This aids the fluke in reproduction, because it enables the miracidium to capitalize on one-chance occasion of passively being eaten by a snail before the egg dies. The mature cercariae bore out of the snail body into the freshwater environment. However, they are nonfeeding and must find a fish host within 2–3 days, otherwise they die.

The cercariae of C. sinensis are different from those of other flukes in that they do not swim. Instead, they initially hang upside down in the water, and then sink to the bottom. They rise to the water surface to resume their initial position, and the movement is repeated again. They attack fish when they feel any disturbance.

=== Second intermediate host ===
When they detect fish, the cercariae attach themselves on the scales using their suckers. Boring their way into the fish's body, they penetrate into the fish muscle within 6 to 13 minutes. Within an hour of penetration, they develop hard coverings called cysts and become metacercariae. This protective cyst is useful when the fish muscle is consumed. The metacercariae gradually develop and become infective to their next hosts after 3 to 4 weeks.

The common second intermediate hosts are freshwater fish such as common carp (Cyprinus carpio), grass carp (Ctenopharyngodon idellus), crucian carp (Carassius carassius), goldfish (Carassius auratus), Pseudorasbora parva, Abbottina rivularis, Hemiculter spp., Opsariichthys spp., Rhodeus spp., Sarcocheilichthys spp., Zacco platypus, Nipponocypris temminckii, and pond smelt (Hypomesus olidus). In China, 102 species of fish and four species of shrimp are known to be the intermediate hosts. In Korea, 40 species of freshwater fish are recorded as hosts. Seven species of fish are known as hosts in Russia.

=== Definitive host ===
Humans are the major definitive hosts. Infection occurs when raw or undercooked fish contaminated with the metacercariae is eaten. The cysts of the metacercariae are gradually digested by the human gastric acids, and upon reaching the small intestines, the entire cyst is lost. The free metacercariae penetrate the intestinal mucosa and enter the bile ducts. Migration into the bile ducts takes 1–2 days. They start feeding on the bile secreted from the liver, and gradually grow. They become adults in about a month, and start laying eggs. The average lifespan of an adult fluke is 30 years. An individual fluke can produce 4,000 eggs in a day.

Other definitive hosts are fish-eating mammals such as dogs, cats, rats, pigs, badgers, weasels, camels, and Water Buffalo.

== Prevalence ==
C. sinensis is estimated to be the third-most prevalent worm parasite in the world. It is endemic to Russia, Japan, China, Taiwan, Korea, and Southeast Asia, especially Vietnam. In Asia it is the most prevalent human trematode, with over 15 million people estimated to be infected and 200 million people at constant risk of infection. China has the highest incidence with about 13 million infections, accounting for 85% of the total cases. Infection rates are generally higher in men, fishermen, farmers, businessmen, and catering staff. The infection is more serious in adults aged 40–60 and the elderly. More cases occur in low- or middle-class countries, increasing the disease burden and creating economic problems. Clonorchiasis causes 921,000 disability-adjusted life years (DALY) globally. The calculated economic burden for treating clonorchiasis-related ailments in the Guangdong Province of China alone was $200 million by 2010.

The type of freshwater fishes and shrimp that are infected by C. sinensis contributes to the prevalence of infection. Commonly eaten fishes (e.g. C. idellus, C. auratus, H. nobilis, C. carpio, H. molitrix, and M. anguillicaudatus) were found to have the metacercariae when sampled from lakes, rivers, and markets. In total, almost 31 types of freshwater fish and shrimp were found to carry the parasite.

== Effects on human health ==
Dwelling in the bile ducts, C. sinensis induces an inflammatory reaction, epithelial hyperplasia, and sometimes even cholangiocarcinoma, the incidence of which is raised in fluke-infested areas.

One adverse effect of Clonorchis spp. is the possibility for the adult metacercaria to consume all bile created in the liver, which would inhibit the host human from digesting food, especially fats. Another possibility is obstruction of the bile duct by the parasite or its eggs, leading to biliary obstruction and cholangitis (specifically oriental cholangitis).

Unusual cases of liver abscesses due to clonorchiasis have been reported. Liver abscesses may be seen even without dilatation of intrahepatic bile ducts.

=== Symptoms ===
While normally asymptomatic, most pathological manifestations result from inflammation and intermittent obstruction of the biliary ducts. The acute phase consists of abdominal pain with associated nausea and diarrhea. Long-standing infections consist of fatigue, abdominal discomfort, anorexia, weight loss, diarrhea, and jaundice. The pathology of long-standing infections consist of bile stasis, obstruction, bacterial infections, inflammation, periductal fibrosis, and hyperplasia. Development of cholangiocarcinoma is progressive.

=== Diagnosis and treatment ===
Infection is detected mainly on identification of eggs by microscopic demonstration in faeces or in duodenal aspirate, but other sophisticated methods have been developed, such as ELISA, which has become the most important clinical technique. Diagnosis by detecting DNAs from eggs in faeces are also developed using PCR, real-time PCR, and loop-mediated isothermal amplification, which are highly sensitive and specific.

Typical imaging features center around imaging of the liver with CT, ultrasound, or MRI for detection of primary biliary cirrhosis. Traits that raise suspicion for the infection include intra- and extrahepatic dilatation and structures with intraductal pigmented stones, usually in the absence of gallstones and with regions of segmental liver atrophy, particularly the lateral aspect of the left hepatic lobe. Also, reduced arborization of peripheral ducts is seen. A full 5% of chronic infections go on to develop cholangiocarcinoma.

Drugs used to treat infestation include triclabendazole, praziquantel, bithionol, albendazole, levamisole, and mebendazole. However, benzimidazoles are very weak as a vermicide. As with other trematodes, praziquantel is the drug of choice. Lately, tribendimidine has been acknowledged as an effective and safe drug.

== Genetics ==
C. sinensis has 28 pairs of chromosomes (2n=56) in a cell. The chromosome pairs can be categorized into two groups: 8 large pairs and 20 small. Structural variations are seen between those from different countries. The draft genome sequence was published in 2011. The total genome size is estimated to be 516 to 580 MB, and the GC content was calculated as about 43.85%. About 16,000 genes are predicted, out of which 13,634 genes have been identified.

== See also ==
- List of parasites (human)
