= Integrated Opisthorchiasis Control Program =

The Integrated Opisthorchiasis Control Program, commonly known as the "Lawa Project", located in Khon Kaen Province, Thailand, is an effort to reduce chronic infection by the Southeast Asian liver fluke (Opisthorchis viverrini) among the native peoples of Isan (Thai: อีสาน; RTGS: isan), the northeast region of Thailand. The project operates under the aegis of the Tropical Disease Research Laboratory, Department of Pathology, Faculty of Medicine, Khon Kaen University. It is directed by Banchob Sripa. Its aim is to eliminate the practice of consuming raw or undercooked fish, the major cause of liver fluke infection and bile duct cancer in the region. The project is unique in that it follows the principles of EcoHealth, a One Health approach to improving human and animal health. The project has been the subject of newspaper and TV reports by BBC, The New York Times, and The Guardian.

== Area and population ==
The project area consists of several villages around the Kaeng Lawa (Thai: แก่งละว้า), a lake and wetlands about 25 kilometers south of the city of Khon Kaen. The people's primary occupations are rice farming and fishing. The lake is a source of the cyprinid fish that the locals consume raw in dishes known as koi pla and pla som, which are often infested with the cysts or metacercariae of the liver fluke. Cats and dogs also ingest the fish, making them hosts for the fluke. Northeast Thailand still has the highest incidence of bile duct cancer in the world, and the prevalence of O. viverrini infection in some villages in Khon Kaen Province has reached 100 percent.

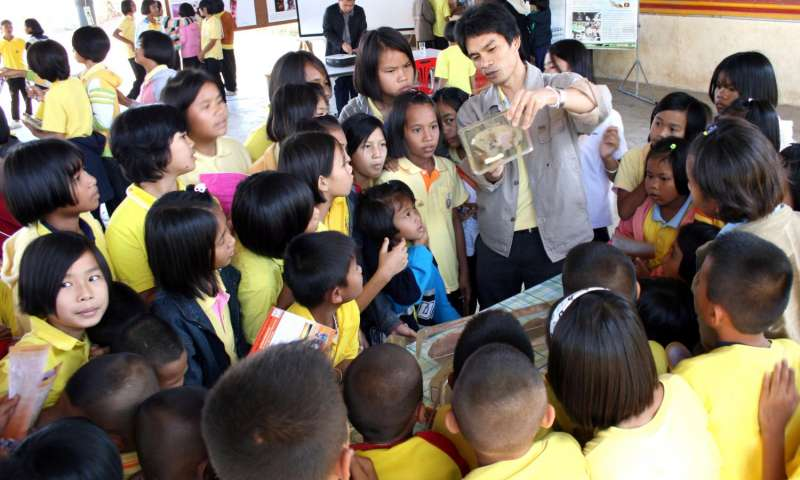
Village health volunteers teaching children about liver fluke infection

== Lawa model ==
The first attempts at opisthorchiasis control in Thailand began in the 1950s and included education on liver fluke infection and safe cooking, but these efforts had limited success since the consumption of raw fish dishes is an ingrained part of the rice-fish culture of the indigenous people. With the introduction of praziquantel in the 1980s, treatment became a part of the program. The prevalence of infection was reduced, but after funding reductions during the economic crises in the 1990s, prevalence rates rose again to as high as 85 percent in some areas of the northeast by 2009. In 2007, researchers at Khon Kaen University, led by Banchob Sripa, decided to take a more multidisciplinary approach, incorporating EcoHealth principles, which involve the collaboration of human and animal health specialists toward improving the health of people, animals and the environment as well as achieving greater understanding of how the ecosystem affects human and animal health. The "Lawa model" as it became known, involves community participation as a key element. Village health volunteers, staff of local sub-district hospitals, teachers, and others maintain a campaign of continuous education, teaching in the community and the schools about liver fluke disease and discouraging the consumption of raw or undercooked fish. The campaigns often involve "edutainment" activities (songwriting, dancing, and music) to attract public attention.

== Benefits ==
After implementation of the Lawa model, the prevalence of infection declined from 67 percent to 16 percent over three years in Lawa village with little reinfection after treatment, a common reason for failure in the past. An intensive program in nine schools in the village reduced infection to undetectable levels. In 2012, the schools were certified as liver fluke free. Infection typically begins in childhood, leading to the lifelong chronic infection that often results in cancer.

An analysis conducted by the university on the social return on investment estimates a return of 3.47 relative to resources invested, with the primary benefit going to villagers and especially the children of the students who should avoid a lifetime of chronic infection and its possible consequences. Such projects are hard to assess solely on the basis of an economic analysis.
