= P. spilopterus =

P. spilopterus may refer to:

- Protomelas spilopterus, a cichlid species
- Puntius spilopterus, a ray-finned fish species
