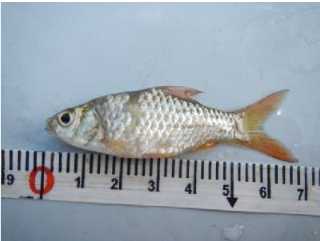

Conservation status
- Least Concern (IUCN 3.1)

Scientific classification
- Kingdom: Animalia
- Phylum: Chordata
- Class: Actinopterygii
- Order: Cypriniformes
- Family: Cyprinidae
- Subfamily: Smiliogastrinae
- Genus: Puntius
- Species: P. brevis

Binomial name
- Puntius brevis (Bleeker, 1849)

Synonyms
- Capoeta brevis Bleeker, 1849; Capoeta javanica Bleeker, 1855; Systomus (Capoeta) leiacanthus Bleeker, 1860; Barbus liacanthus Günther, 1868; Parabarbus habilis Franz, 1910; Barbus spilopterus Fowler, 1934; Puntius spilopterus (Fowler, 1934); Puntius leicanthus malayensis Menon, 1955; Puntius ocellatus Mai, 1978

= Puntius brevis =

Species of fish

Puntius brevis, sometimes known as the swamp barb, is a species of ray-finned fish in the genus Puntius. It is found in the Mekong and Chao Phraya basins. Puntius spilopterus is sometimes considered conspecific.

This fish is one of the identified hosts of Opisthorchis viverrini, the Southeast Asian liver fluke.
