= Bithynia longicornis =

Scientific classification
- Domain: Eukaryota
- Kingdom: Animalia
- Phylum: Mollusca
- Class: Gastropoda
- Subclass: Caenogastropoda
- Order: Littorinimorpha
- Family: Bithyniidae
- Genus: Bithynia
- Species: B. longicornis

Binomial name
- Bithynia longicornis Benson

Synonyms
- Alocinma longicornis

Species of gastropod

Bithynia longicornis is a species of freshwater snail with a gill and an operculum, an aquatic gastropod mollusk in the family Bithyniidae.

== Distribution ==
The distribution of this species includes:

- China

== Ecology ==
Bithynia longicornis is the first intermediate host for:

- trematode Clonorchis sinensis
