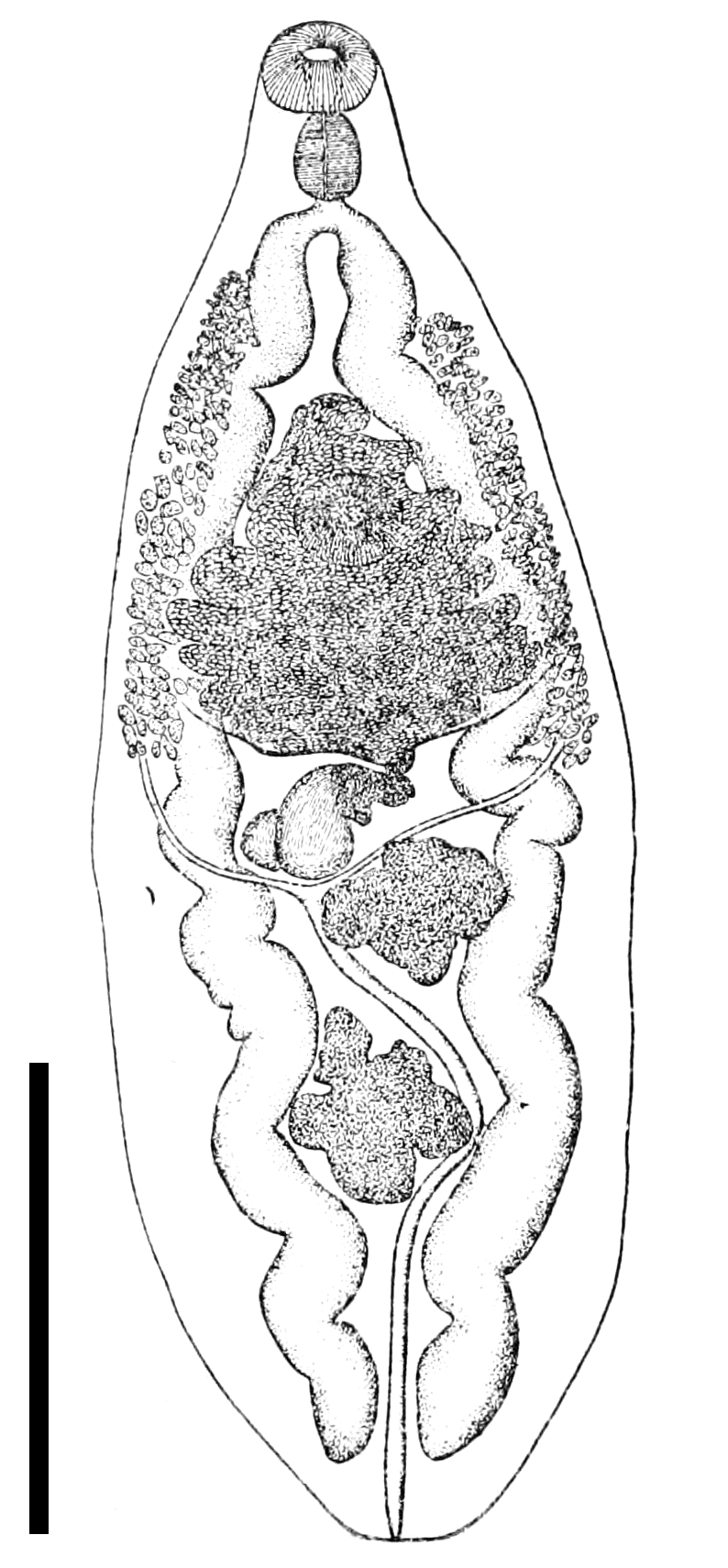
- Drawing of ventral view of Metorchis conjunctus, scale bar is 1 mm

Scientific classification
- Kingdom: Animalia
- Phylum: Platyhelminthes
- Class: Trematoda
- Order: Plagiorchiida
- Family: Opisthorchiidae
- Genus: Metorchis
- Species: M. conjunctus

Binomial name
- Metorchis conjunctus Cobbold, 1860

Synonyms
- Parametorchis noveboracensis (Hung, 1926); Parametorchis intermedius (Price, 1929); Parametorchis canadensis (Price, 1929); Parametorchis manitobensis (Allen & Wardle, 1934)

= Metorchis conjunctus =

Species of fluke

Metorchis conjunctus, common name Canadian liver fluke, is a species of trematode parasite in the family Opisthorchiidae. It can infect mammals that eat raw fish in North America. The first intermediate host is a freshwater snail and the second is a freshwater fish.

== Taxonomy ==
This species was discovered and described by Thomas Spencer Cobbold in 1860.

== Distribution ==
The distribution of M. conjunctus includes:

- East Greenland
- From Quebec to Saskatchewan
- Maine, Connecticut, South Carolina, US

== Description ==
The body of M. conjunctus is pear-shaped and flat. The body length is 1/4–3/8 inch (6.4–9.5 mm). It has a weakly muscular terminal oral sucker. No prepharynx is present. The pharynx is strongly muscular. The esophagus is very short. The intestinal ceca vary from almost straight to sinuous. The acetabulum is slightly oval and weakly muscular. The male has an anterior testis and a posterior testis. The testes vary from almost round to oval, and may be deeply lobed or slightly indented. No cirrus pouch is found. The seminal vesicle is slender. The ovary is trilobed. The receptaculum seminis is elongated or pyriform, and slightly twisted, and situated to the right and behind the ovary.

The eggs are oval and yellowish brown.

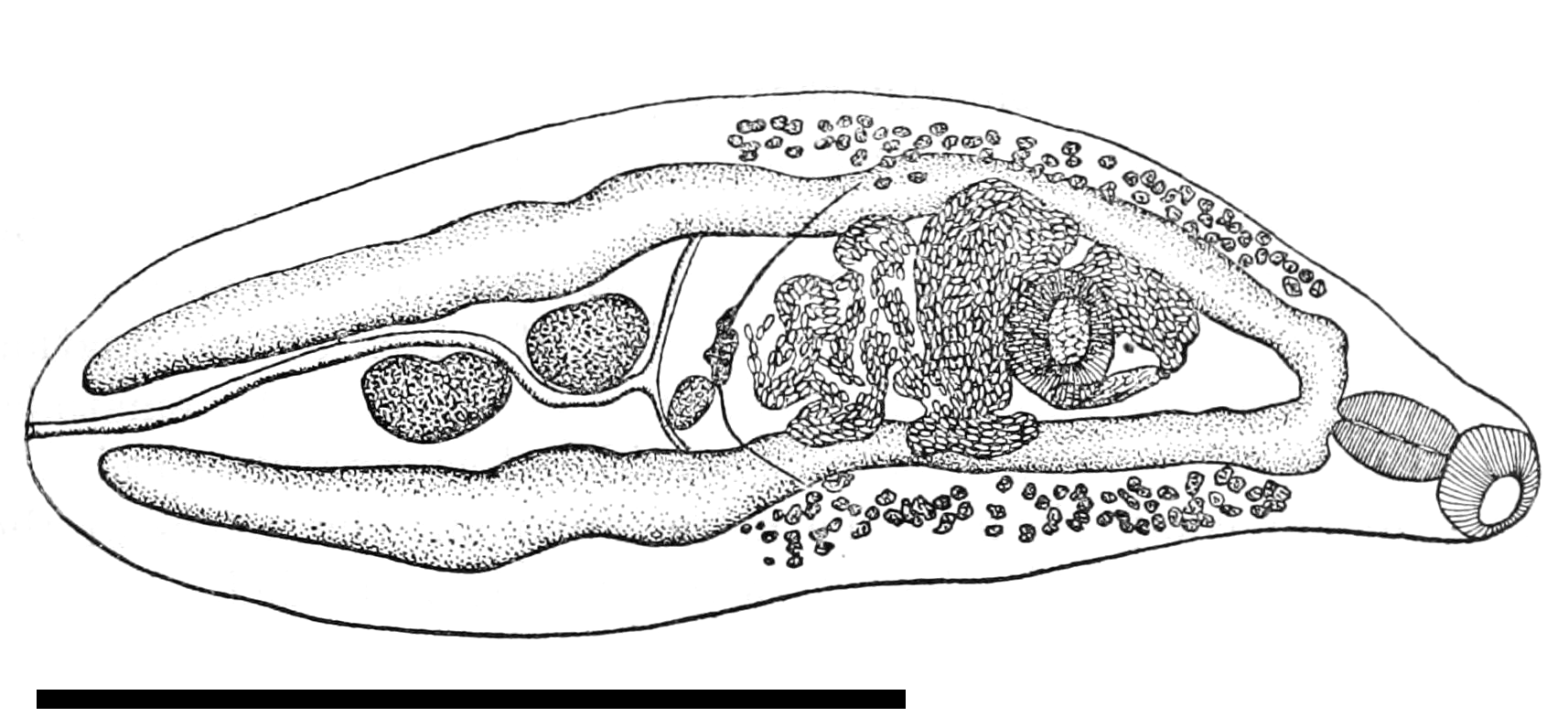
Drawing of dorsal view of M. conjunctus, scale bar is 1 mm

== Lifecycle ==
The first intermediate host of M. conjunctus is a freshwater snail, Amnicola limosus.

The second intermediate host is a freshwater fish: Catostomus catostomus, Salvelinus fontinalis, Perca flavescens, or Catostomus commersoni. Metacercaria of M. conjunctus were also found in northern pike (Esox lucius).

The definitive hosts are fish-eating mammals such as domestic dogs (Canis lupus familiaris), domestic cats (Felis catus), wolves (Canis lupus), red foxes (Vulpes vulpes), gray foxes (Urocyon cinereoargenteus), coyotes (Canis latrans), raccoons (Procyon lotor), muskrats (Ondatra zibethicus), American minks (Neovison vision), fishers (Martes pennanti), or bears. It can also infect humans. It lives in the bile duct and in the gallbladder.

== Effects on human health ==
M. conjunctus causes a disease called metorchiasis. It has been known to infect humans since 1946. Humans had eggs of M. conjunctus in their stools, but they were asymptomatic. Sashimi from raw Catostomus commersoni was identified as a source for an outbreak in Montreal in 1993. It was the first symptomatic disease in humans caused by M. conjunctus.

=== Symptoms ===
After ingestion of fish infected with M. conjunctus, about 1–15 days are needed for symptoms to occur, namely for eggs to be detected in the stool (incubation period).

The acute phase consists of upper abdominal pain and low-grade fever. High concentrations of eosinophil granulocytes are in blood. Also, higher concentrations of liver enzymes are seen. When untreated, symptoms may last from 3 days to 4 weeks. Symptoms of chronic infection were not reported.

=== Diagnosis and treatment ===
Eggs of M. conjunctus can be found by stool analysis. Serologic analysis can be also used - ELISA test for IgG antibodies against antigens of M. conjunctus.

Drugs used to treat infestation include praziquantel: 75 mg/kg in three doses per day (the same dosage applies for adults and for children).

== Effects on animal health ==
Watson and Croll (1981) studied symptoms of cats. Prevention includes feeding with cooked fish (not raw fish).

M. conjunctus was found to be a common infection of domestic dogs in First Nations settlements in 1973. It has been in found in other animals including raccoons, minks, and gray foxes.

The prevalence of M. conjunctus in wolves in Canada is 1–3%. In wolves, M. conjunctus causes cholangiohepatitis with periductular fibrosis in the liver. It sometimes causes chronic inflammation and fibrosis of the pancreas in wolves.
