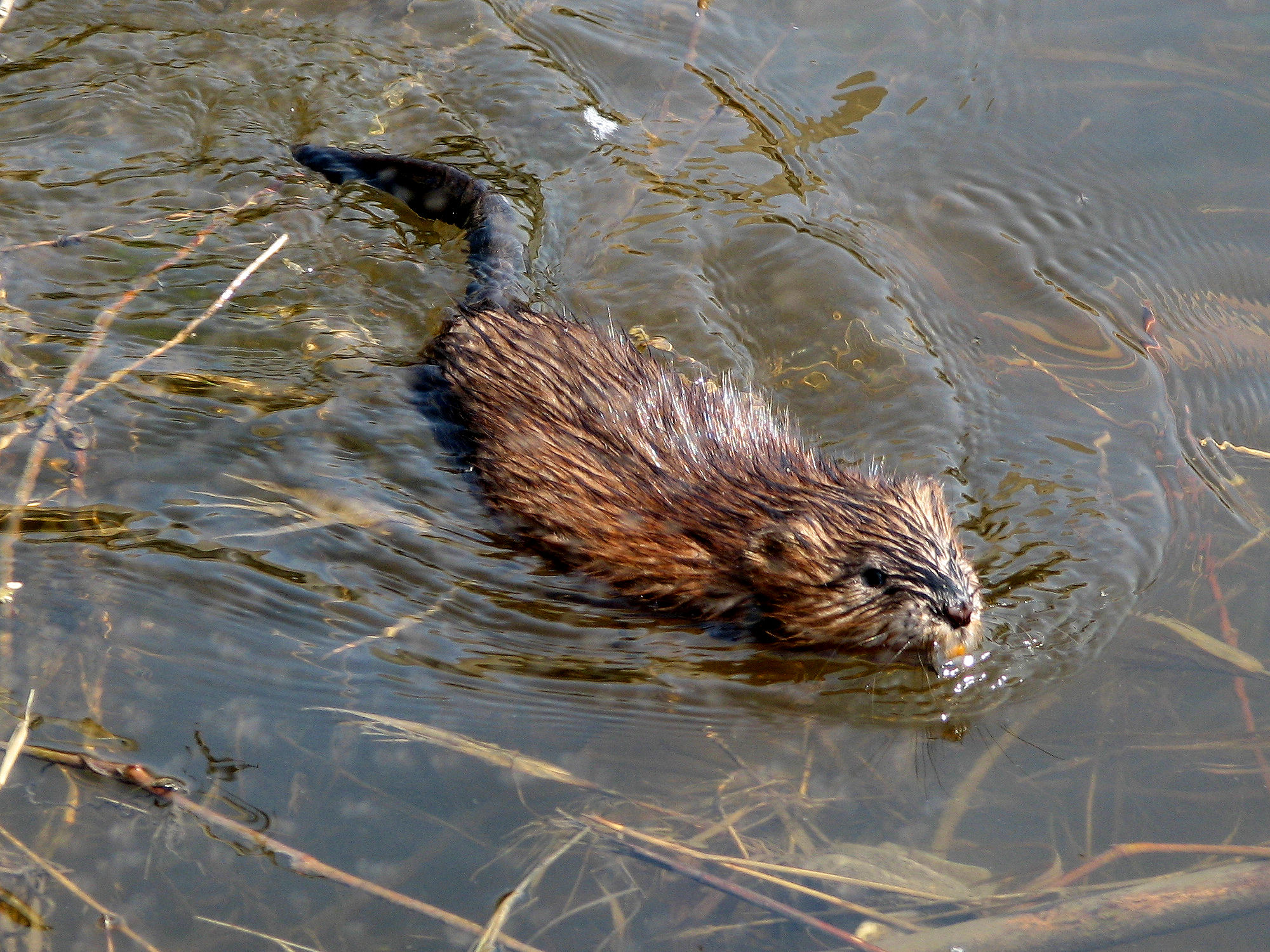
- Muskrat swimming in Ottawa, Canada

Conservation status
- Least Concern (IUCN 3.1)

Scientific classification
- Kingdom: Animalia
- Phylum: Chordata
- Class: Mammalia
- Order: Rodentia
- Family: Cricetidae
- Subfamily: Arvicolinae
- Tribe: Ondatrini
- Genus: Ondatra; Link, 1795
- Species: O. zibethicus

Binomial name
- Ondatra zibethicus (Linnaeus, 1766)
- Range of the Muskrat Native Introduced

Synonyms
- Castor zibethicus Linnaeus, 1766

= Muskrat =

Species of rodent

The muskrat or common muskrat (Ondatra zibethicus) is a medium-sized semiaquatic rodent.

Adult muskrats weigh 0.6–2 kg (1 1/4–4 1/2 lb), with a body length (excluding the tail) of 20–35 cm (8–14 in). They are covered with short, thick fur of medium to dark brown color. Their long tails, covered with scales rather than hair, are laterally compressed and generate a small amount of thrust, with their webbed hind feet being the main means of propulsion and the unique tail mainly important in directional stability. Muskrats spend most of their time in the water and can swim underwater for 12 to 17 minutes. They live in families of a male and female pair and their young. They build nests to protect themselves from the cold and predators, often burrowed into the bank with an underwater entrance. Muskrats feed mostly on cattail and other aquatic vegetation but also eat small animals.

Ondatra zibethicus is the only extant species in the genus Ondatra; its closest relative is the round-tailed muskrat (Neofiber alleni). It is the largest species in the subfamily Arvicolinae, which includes 142 other species of rodents, mostly voles and lemmings.

The species is native to North America and an introduced species in parts of Eurasia and South America. The muskrat is found in various wetlands and has crucial effects on their ecology. It is also a resource of food and fur for humans.

== Description ==
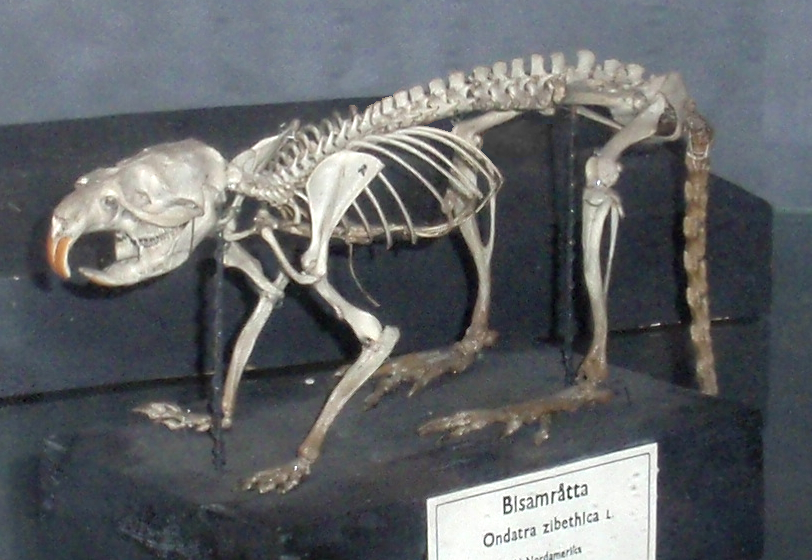
Muskrat skeleton

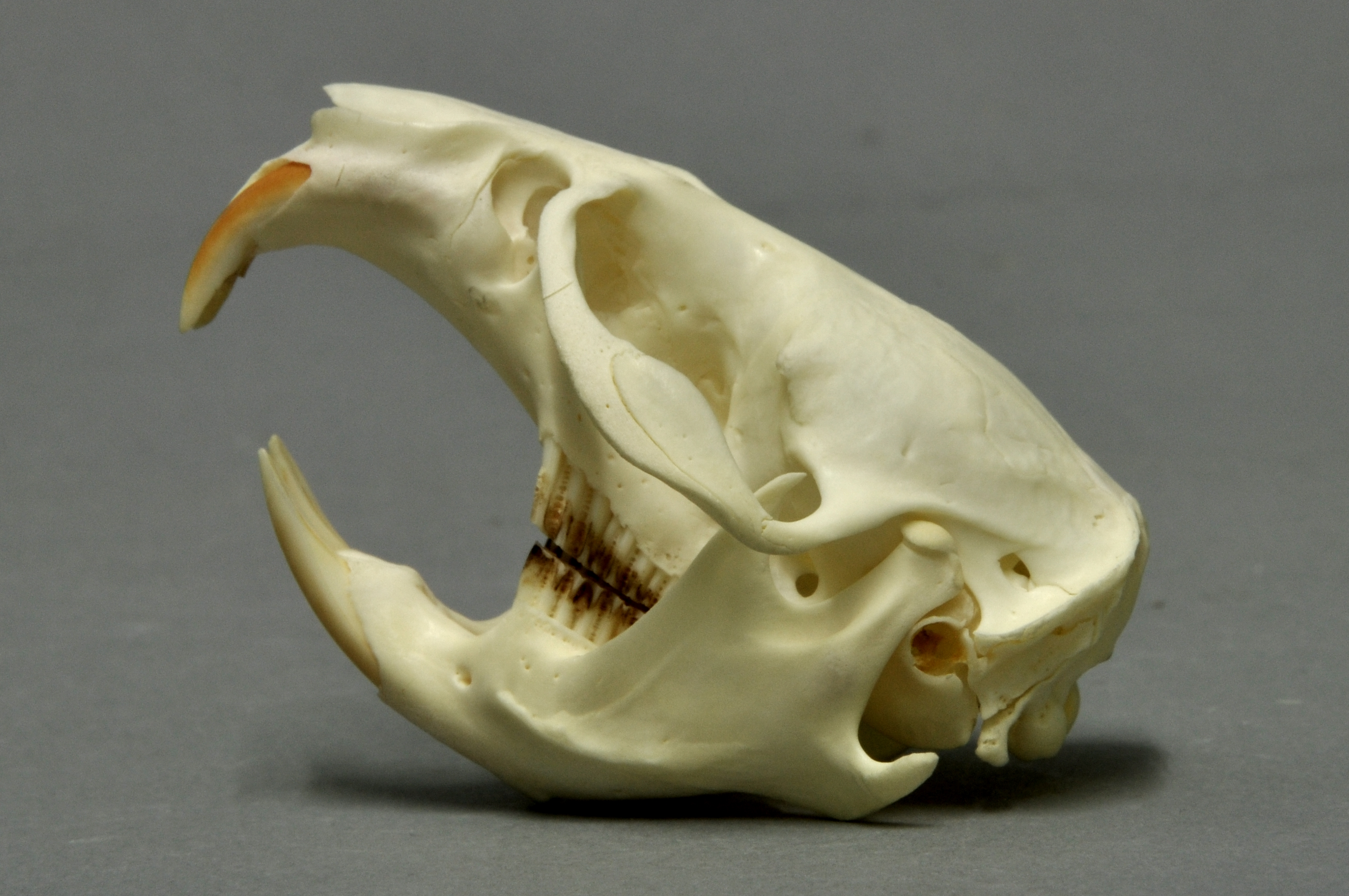
Muskrat skull

An adult muskrat is about 40–70 cm (16–28 in) long, half of that length being the tail, and weighs 0.6–2 kg (1 1/4–4 1/2 lb). That is about four times the weight of the brown rat (Rattus norvegicus), though an adult muskrat is only slightly longer. It is one of the most prominent and heaviest members of the family Cricetidae, which includes all voles, lemmings, and most mice native to the Americas, and hamsters in Eurasia. The muskrat is much smaller than a beaver (Castor canadensis), with which they often share a habitat.

Muskrats are covered with short, thick fur, which is medium to dark brown or black, with the belly a bit lighter (countershaded); as the animal ages, it turns partly gray. The fur has two layers, which protect it from cold water. They have long tails covered with scales rather than hair. To aid in swimming, their tails are slightly flattened vertically, a shape that is unique to them. When they walk on land, their tails drag on the ground, which makes their tracks easy to recognize.

Muskrats spend most of their time in water and are well suited to their semiaquatic life. They can swim underwater for 12 to 17 minutes. Their bodies, like those of seals and whales, are less sensitive to the buildup of carbon dioxide than those of most other mammals. They can close off their ears to keep water out. Their hind feet are partially webbed and are their primary means of propulsion. Their tail functions as a rudder, controlling the direction they swim.

Musk glands are situated in the tail.

=== Behavior ===
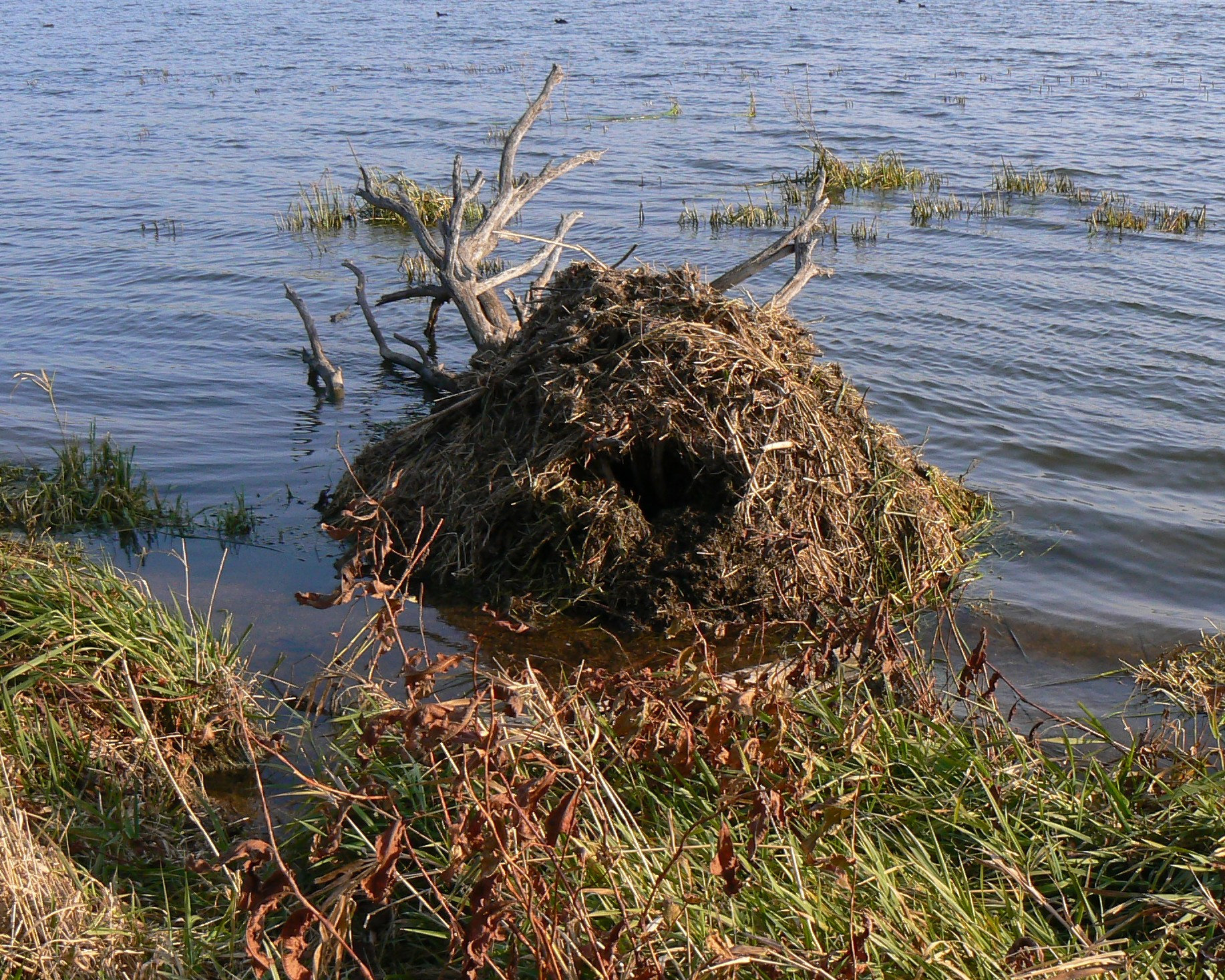
A muskrat house

Muskrats normally live in families consisting of a male and female and their young. During the spring, they often fight with other muskrats over territory and potential mates. Many are injured or killed in these fights. Muskrat families build nests to protect themselves and their young from cold and predators. Muskrats burrow into the bank with an underwater entrance in streams, ponds, or lakes. These entrances are 15–20 cm (6–8 in) wide. In marshes, push-ups are constructed from vegetation and mud. These push-ups are up to 90 cm (3 ft) in height. In snowy areas, they keep the openings to their push-ups closed by plugging them with vegetation, which they replace daily. Some muskrat push-ups are swept away in spring floods and must be replaced yearly. Muskrats also build feeding platforms constructed in the water from cut pieces of vegetation supported by a branch structure. They help maintain open areas in marshes, which helps to provide habitat for aquatic birds.

Muskrats are most active at night or near dawn and dusk. They feed on cattails and other aquatic vegetation. They do not store food for the winter, but sometimes eat the insides of their push-ups. While they may appear to steal food beavers have stored, more seemingly cooperative partnerships with beavers exist, as featured in the BBC David Attenborough wildlife documentary The Life of Mammals. Plant materials compose about 95% of their diets, but they also eat small animals, such as freshwater mussels, frogs, crayfish, fish, and small turtles. Muskrats follow trails they make in swamps and ponds. They continue to follow their trails under the ice when the water freezes.

Muskrats provide an important food resource for many other animals, including pikes, snapping turtles, American mink, foxes, coyotes, gray wolf, American black bears, lynxes, great horned owls, gyrfalcons, American goshawks, bald eagles, golden eagles, raccoons, black snakes, American alligators, and cottonmouths. Caribou, moose, and elk sometimes feed on the vegetation which makes up muskrat push-ups during the winter when other food is scarce for them. In their introduced range in the former Soviet Union, the muskrat's greatest predator is the golden jackal. During the winter of 1948–49 in the Amu Darya (river in central Asia), muskrats constituted 12.3% of jackal feces contents, and 71% of muskrat houses were destroyed by jackals, 16% of which froze and became unsuitable for muskrat occupation. Jackals also harm the muskrat industry by eating muskrats caught in traps or taking skins left out to dry.

Muskrats, like most rodents, are prolific breeders. Females can have two or three litters a year of six to eight young each. The babies are born small and hairless and weigh only about 22 g (0.78 oz). In southern environments, young muskrats mature in six months, while in colder northern environments, it takes about a year. Muskrat populations appear to go through a regular pattern of rise and dramatic decline spread over a six- to ten-year period. Some other rodents, including famously the muskrat's close relatives, such as the lemmings, go through the same type of population changes.

== Subspecies ==
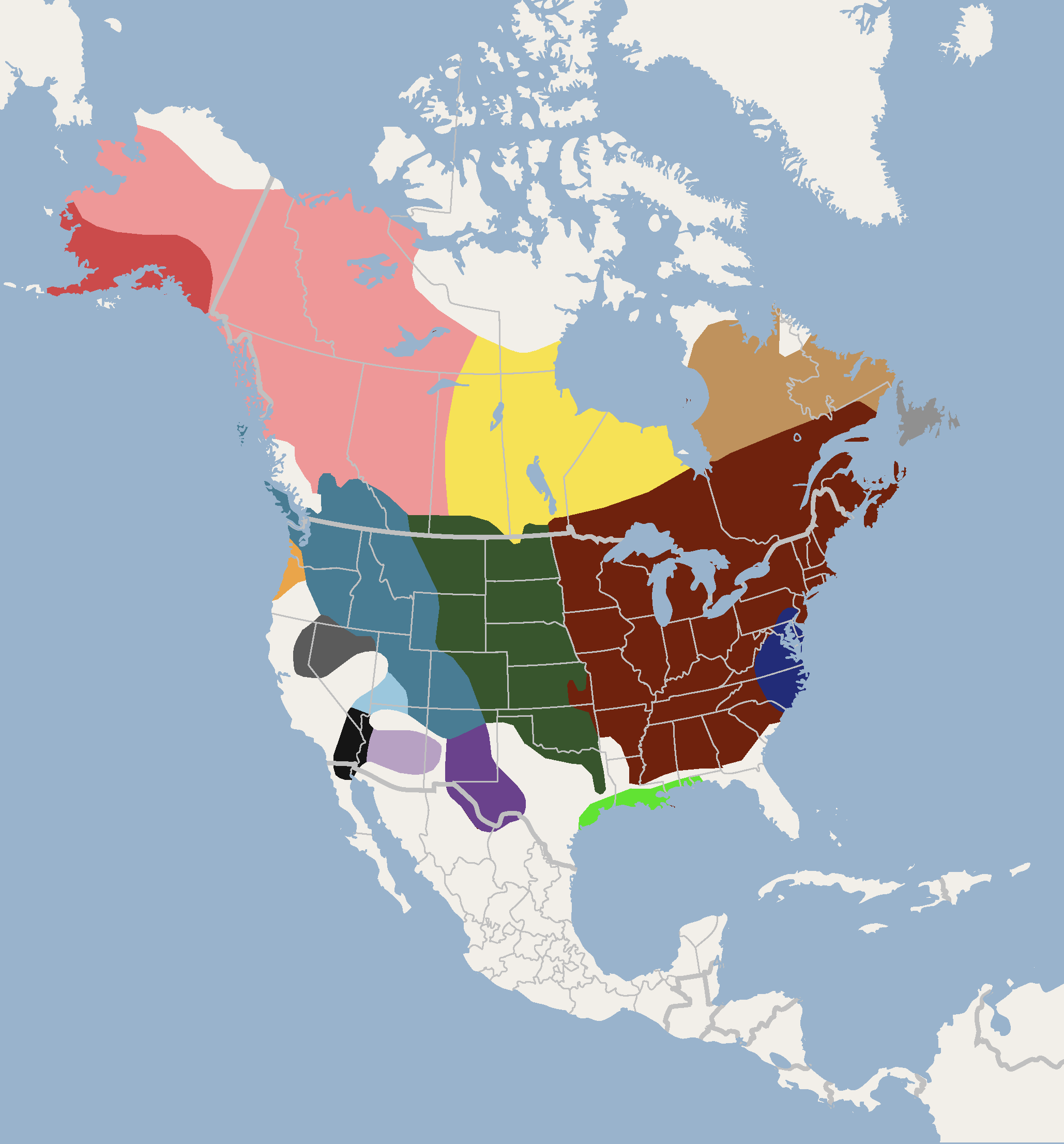
Distribution of subspecies in North America. O. z. zibethicus O. z. albus O. z. aquilonius O. z. bernardi O. z. cinnamominus O. z. goldmani O. z. macrodon O. z. mergens O. z. obscurus O. z. occipitalis O. z. osoyoosensis O. z. pallidus O. z. ripensis O. z. rivalicus O. z. spatulatus O. z. zalophus

Ondatra zibethicus has 16 subspecies: O. z. albus, O. z. aquihnis, O. z. bemardi, O. z. cinnamominus, O. z. macrodom, O. z. mergens, O. z. obscurus, O. z. occipitalis, O. z. osoyoosensis, O. z. pallidus, O. z. ripensis, O. z. rivalicus, O. z. roidmani, O. z. spatulatus, O. z. zalaphus and O. z. zibethicus.

== Etymology ==
The specific name zibethicus means "musky", being the adjective of zibethus "civet musk; civet". The genus name comes from the Huron word for the animal, ondathra, and entered Neo-Latin as Ondatra via French.

The muskrat's common name probably comes from a word of Algonquian (possibly Powhatan) origin, muscascus (literally "it is red", so called for its colorings), or from the Abenaki native word mòskwas, as seen in the archaic English name for the animal, musquash. Because of the association with the "musky" odor, which the muskrat uses to mark its territory, and its flattened tail, the name became altered to musk-beaver; later it became "muskrat" due to its resemblance to rats.

== Distribution and ecology ==
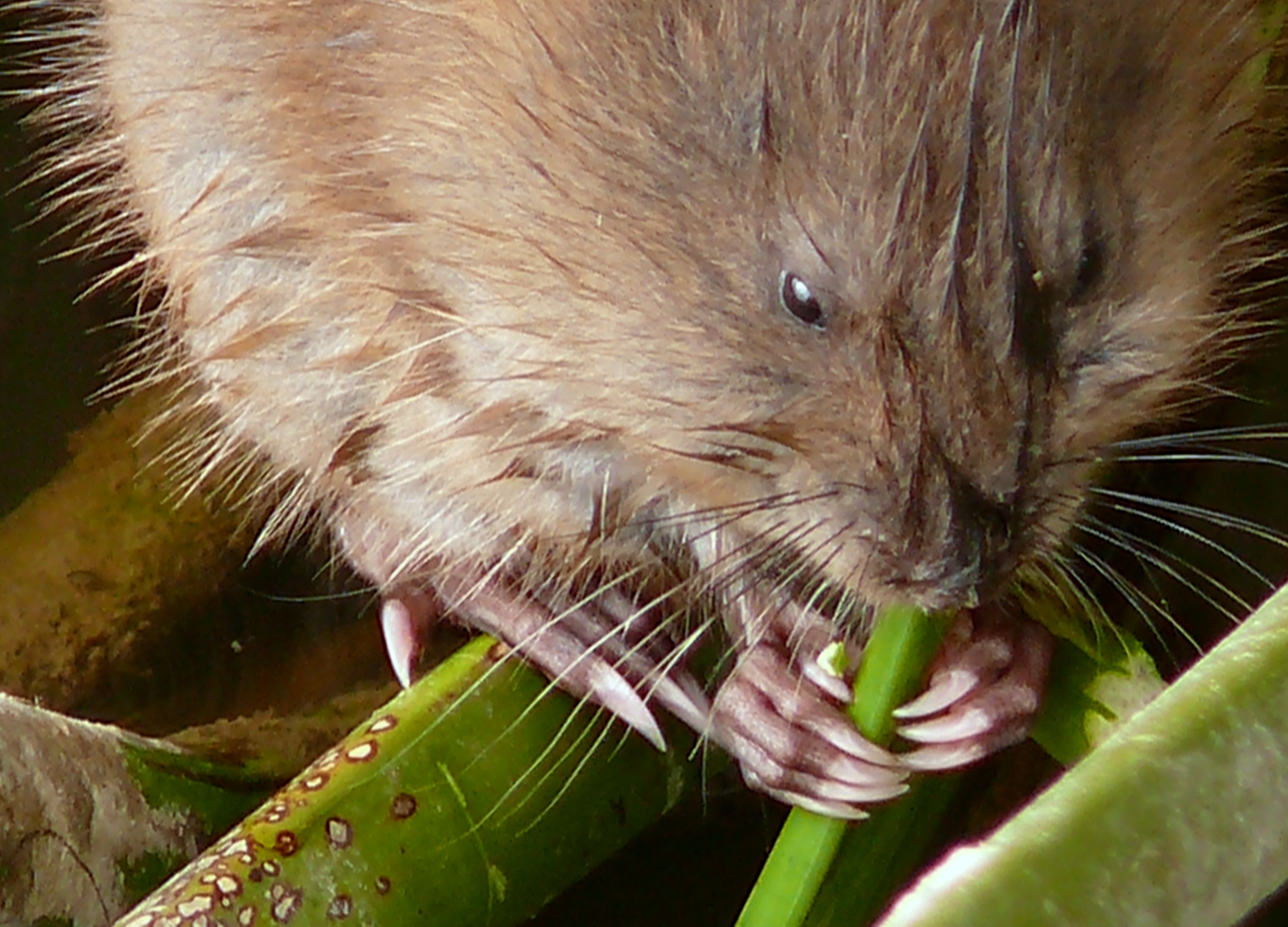
A muskrat eating a plant, showing the long claws used for digging burrows

Muskrats are found in most of Canada, the United States, and a small part of northern Mexico. They were introduced to Europe at the beginning of the 20th century and have become an invasive species in northwestern Europe. They primarily inhabit wetlands, areas in or near saline and freshwater wetlands, rivers, lakes, or ponds. They are not found in Florida, where the round-tailed muskrat, or Florida water rat (Neofiber alleni), fills their ecological niche.

Their populations naturally cycle; in areas where they become abundant, they can remove much of the vegetation in wetlands. They are thought to play a major role in determining the vegetation of prairie wetlands in particular. They also selectively remove preferred plant species, thereby changing the abundance of plant species in many kinds of wetlands. Species commonly eaten include cattail and yellow water lily. Alligators are thought to be an important natural predator, and the absence of muskrats from Florida may, in part, be the result of alligator predation.

While much wetland habitat has been eliminated due to human activity, new muskrat habitat has been created by the construction of canals or irrigation channels (e.g., acequias), and the muskrat remains widespread. They can live alongside streams that contain the sulfurous water that drains away from coal mines. Fish and frogs perish in such streams, yet muskrats may thrive and occupy the wetlands. Muskrats also benefit from human persecution of some of their predators.

The muskrat is classed as a "prohibited new organism" under New Zealand's Hazardous Substances and New Organisms Act 1996, preventing it from being imported into the country.

The trematode Metorchis conjunctus can also infect muskrats.

=== Decline in the United States ===
According to an April 2024 article in Hakai Magazine, the muskrat populations have declined by at least one-half in 34 US states. The collapse was near-total, from 90–99% in a handful of states. Rhode Island's muskrat populations are estimated to be roughly 15% of what they were several decades ago. The decline in muskrat populations began in the 1990s and early 2000s.

=== Invasiveness ===
In Europe, the muskrat has been included in the list of invasive alien species of Union concern (the European Union list) since August 2, 2017. This implies that this species cannot be imported, bred, transported, commercialized, or intentionally released into the environment in the whole of the EU. Muskrats were introduced to Europe in the early 20th century for fur farming. In 1905 five muskrats (2 males and 3 females) were released into a park by House of Colloredo-Mansfeld in Dobříš. In many European countries, muskrats have become problematic, damaging flood control systems, crops, and river banks with burrowing activities. Their presence is particularly concerning in areas with delicate ecosystems, where they can outcompete or displace native species. Several European countries have implemented control measures and eradication programs to manage muskrat populations and mitigate their impact.

In countries such as Belgium, France, and the Netherlands, the muskrat is considered an invasive pest, as its burrowing damages the dikes and levees on which these low-lying countries depend for protection from flooding. In those countries, it is trapped, poisoned, and hunted to attempt to keep the population down. Muskrats also eat corn and other farm and garden crops growing near water bodies.

== Uses ==
Muskrats have sometimes been a food resource for North Americans, amongst others. Since the 19th century in southeastern Michigan, they have sometimes been eaten by some Catholics, e.g. on days that other meats are prohibited. Preparation typically involves the removal of the musk glands, situated in the tail but possibly contaminating the lower belly.

Muskrat fur is warm, becoming prime in northern North America at the beginning of December. In the early 20th century, the trapping of the animal for its fur became an important industry there. During that era, the fur was specially trimmed and dyed to be sold widely in the US as "Hudson seal" fur. Muskrats were introduced at that time to Europe as a fur resource and spread throughout northern Europe and Asia.

Royal Canadian Mounted Police winter hats are made from muskrat fur.

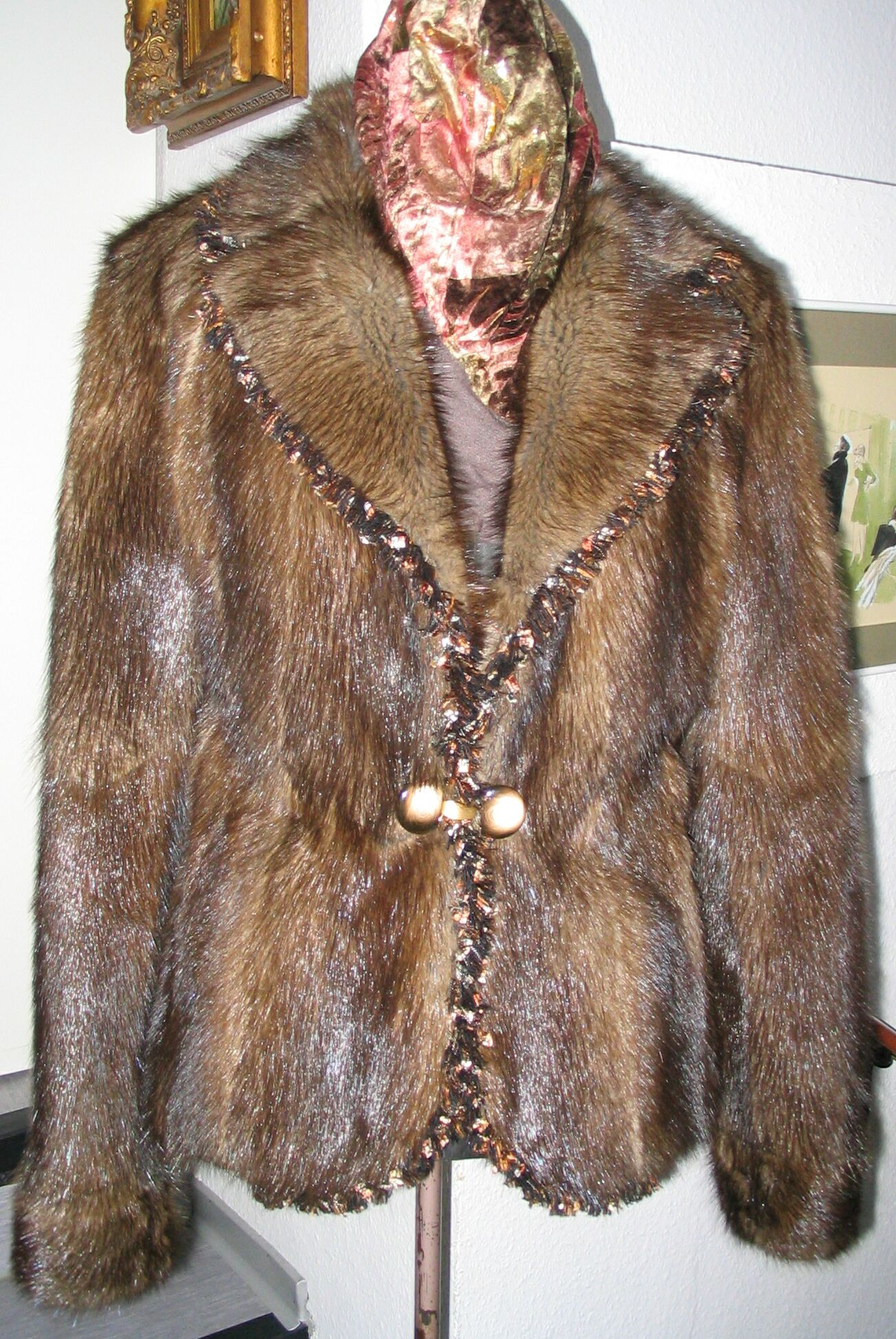
Muskrat fur coat

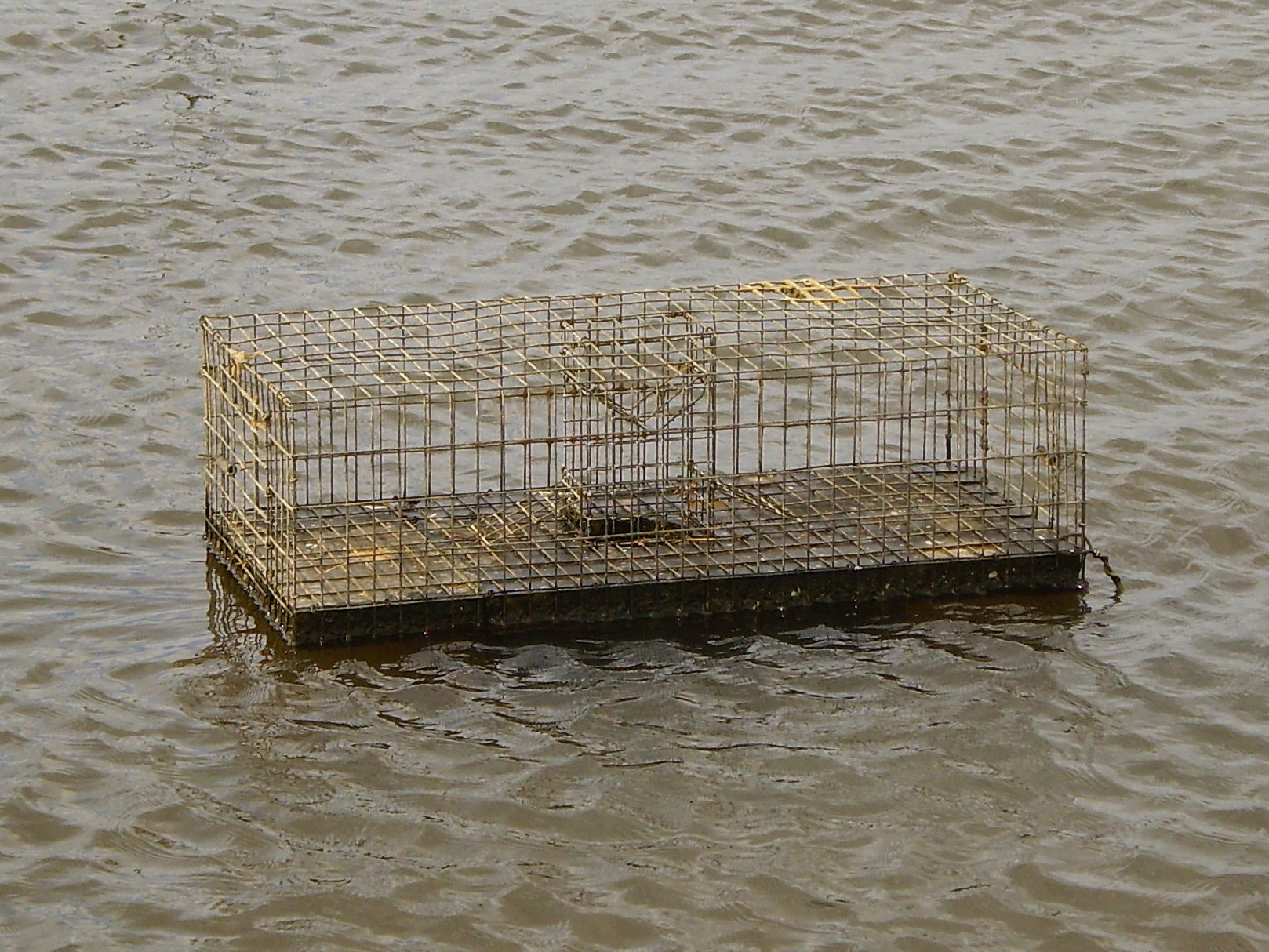
Muskrat trap in the Netherlands

== In culture ==
Native Americans have long considered the muskrat to be an important animal. Some predict winter snowfall levels by observing the size and timing of muskrat lodge construction. In several Native American creation myths, namely that of the Haudenosaunee, the muskrat dives to the bottom of the primordial sea to bring up the mud from which the earth is created after other animals have failed in the task.

Since at least the early 19th century in southeastern Michigan, a longstanding dispensation allows Catholics to consume muskrat as their Friday penance, on Ash Wednesday, and on Lenten Fridays (when the eating of flesh, except for fish, is prohibited). In 2019, it was reported that a series of muskrat dinners were held during Lent in the areas along the Detroit River, with up to 900 muskrats being consumed at a single dinner. The preparation involved the removal of the musk glands, gutting and cleaning the carcass, parboiling the meat for four hours with onion and garlic, and finally frying it.
