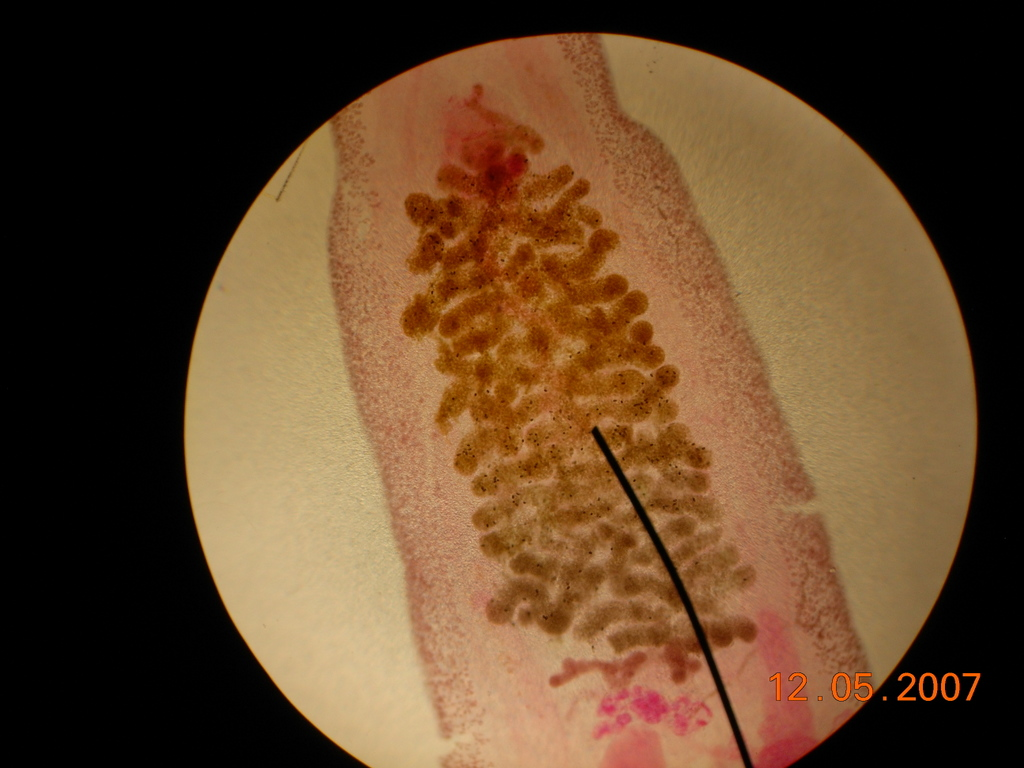
- Clonorchis sinensis under a light microscope

Scientific classification
- Kingdom: Animalia
- Phylum: Platyhelminthes
- Class: Trematoda
- Order: Plagiorchiida
- Suborder: Opisthorchiata
- Superfamily: Opisthorchioidea
- Family: Opisthorchiidae; Looss, 1899

= Opisthorchiidae =

Family of flukes

Opisthorchiidae is a family of digenean trematodes. Opisthorchiidae have cosmopolitan distribution.

The most medically important species in the family Opisthorchiidae are Clonorchis sinensis, Opisthorchis viverrini, and Opisthorchis felineus, that are causes of the disease clonorchiasis.

Some species are parasites of economically important fish, e.g. Clarias gariepinus.

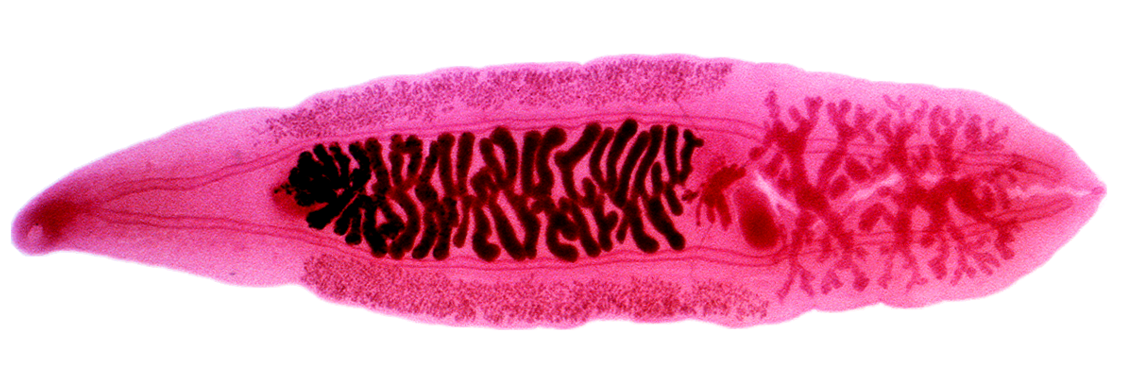
Clonorchis sinensis

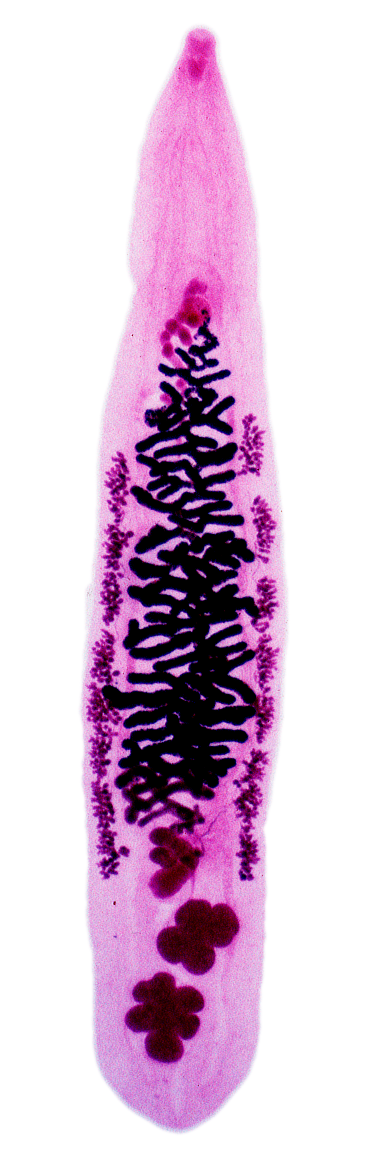
Opisthorchis viverrini

== Subfamilies ==
Thirteen subfamilies are in the family Opisthorchiidae: but their number is inconsistent:

- Allogomtiotrematinae - Gupta, 1955; Yamaguti, 1958 - two genera
- Aphallinae - Yamaguti, 1958 - one genus
- Delphinicolinae - Yamaguti, 1933 - one genus
- Diasiellinae - Yamaguti, 1958 - one genus
- Metorchiinae - Luhe, 1909 - four genera
- Oesophagicolinae - Yamaguti, 1933 - one genus
- Opisthorchiinae - Yamaguti, 1899 - 14 genera
- Pachytrematinae - Railliet, 1919; Ejsmont, 1931 - one genus
- Plotnikoviinae - Skrjabin, 1945; Skrjabin et Petrov, 1950 - one genus
- Pseudamphimerinae - Skrjabin et Petrov, 1950 - three genera
- Pseudamphistominae - Yamaguti, 1958 - two genera
- Ratziinae - Dollfus, 1929; Price, 1940 - one genus
- Tubangorchiinae - Yamaguti, 1958 - one genus

== Genera ==
The family Opisthorchiidae consists of 33 valid genera:

- Agrawalotrema Sahay & Sahay, 1988
- Allogomtiotrema Yamaguti, 1958
- Amphimerus Barker, 1911
- Cladocystis Poche, 1926
- Clonorchis Looss, 1907
- Cyclorchis Luhe, 1908
- Delphinicola Yamaguti, 1933
- Diasiella Travassos, 1949
- Erschoviorchis Skrjabin, 1945
- Euamphimerus Yamaguti, 1941
- Evranorchis Skrjabin, 1944
- Gomtia Thapar, 1930
- Hepatiarius Fedzullaev, 1961
- Holometra Looss, 1899
- Metametorchis Morozov, 1939
- Metorchis Looss, 1899
- Microtrema Kobayashi, 1915
- Nigerina Baugh, 1958
- Oesophagicola Yamaguti, 1933
- Opisthorchis Blanchard, 1895
- Pachytrema Looss, 1907
- Parametorchis Skrjabin, 1913
- Paropisthorchis Stephens, 1912
- Plotnikovia Skrjabin, 1945
- Pseudamphimerus Gower, 1940
- Pseudamphistomum Luhe, 1908
- Pseudogomtiotrema Gupta & Jain, 1991
- Ratzia Poche, 1926
- Satyapalia Lakshminarayana & Hafeezullah, 1974
- Thaparotrema Gupta, 1955
- Trionychotrema Chin & Zhang, 1981
- Tubangorchis Skrjabin, 1944
- Witenbergia Vaz, 1932
