= Koi (dish) =

Lao-Thai salad dish with raw beef

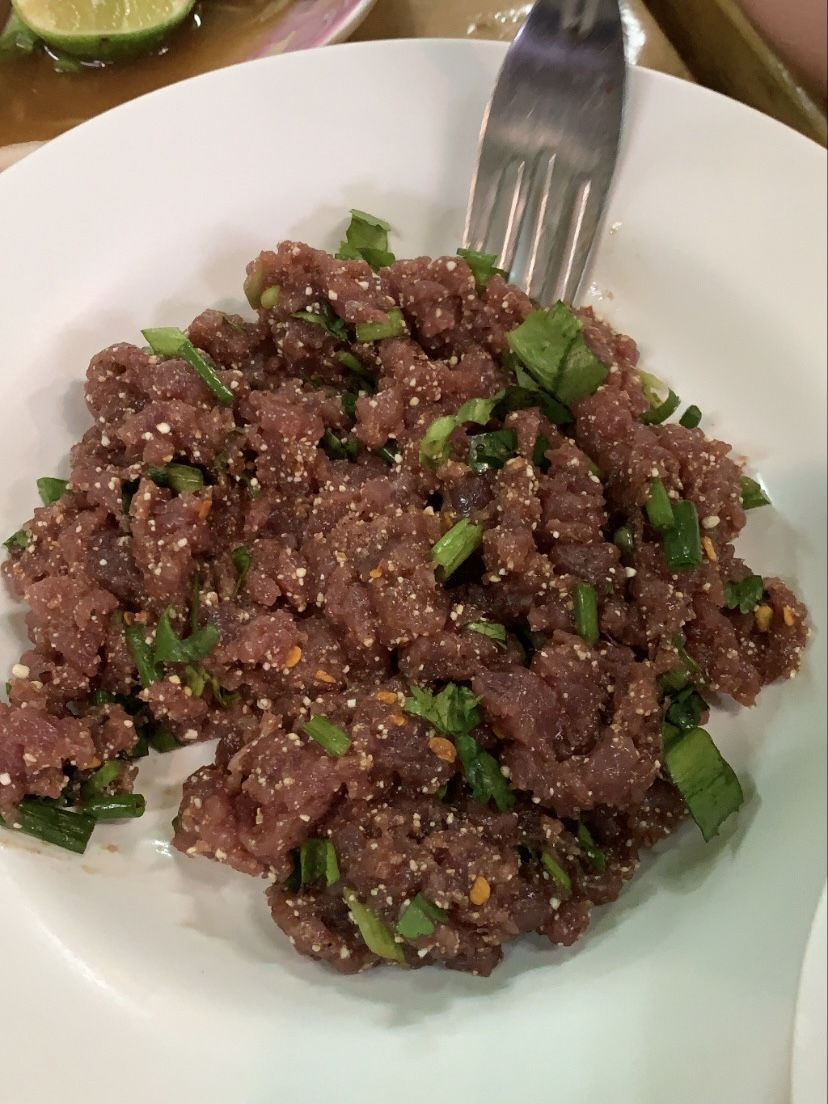
- Koi nuea, koi made with raw beef
- Type: Salad
- Place of origin: Mainland Southeast Asia
- Region or state: Southeast Asia
- Associated cuisine: Laos, Thailand, Vietnam
- Created by: Lao people, Thai people of Vietnam

Koi (Lao: ກ້ອຍ; Thai: ก้อย, Thai pronunciation: [kɔ̂j]) is a "salad" dish of the Lao people living in modern-day Laos Isan, Thailand and Thai people of Vietnam (Son La province) consisting of raw meat denatured by acidity, usually from lime juice. Common varieties include koi kung (Thai: ก้อยกุ้ง), with shrimp as the main ingredient, and koi paa (Lao: ກ້ອຍປາ)/koi pla (Thai: ก้อยปลา), which consists of minced or finely chopped raw fish in spicy salad dressing.

Koi can be a source of parasitic diseases. Koi made with raw fish is a popular dish in Laos and Isaan and a common source of infection with the Southeast Asian liver fluke Opisthorchis viverrini.

Koi pla eaten in north-east Thailand is made from raw fish, live red ants, herbs and lime juice. Koi pla is eaten soon after it is prepared, without a long period of soaking in acid juice. It is believed to be a cause of cholangiocarcinoma via liver fluke transmission.

Koi hoi is a dish containing raw snail meat that has been associated with human infection with parasitic flatworms or liver flukes that infect the snail. Liver fluke infection is the cause of bile duct cancer, the infection may also account for more than 50 percent of cancers diagnosed in men in this region, compared to just 10 percent globally. Liver infection is also caused by the rat lungworm Angiostrongylus cantonensis.

== See also ==
- Gỏi
- Lao cuisine
- Larb
- List of salads
- Thai salad
- Ceviche
