= Assiminea lutea =

Scientific classification
- Kingdom: Animalia
- Phylum: Mollusca
- Class: Gastropoda
- Subclass: Caenogastropoda
- Order: Littorinimorpha
- Family: Assimineidae
- Genus: Assiminea
- Species: A. lutea

Binomial name
- Assiminea lutea (A. Adams, 1861)

Synonyms
- Assiminea (Assiminea) lutea A. Adams, 1861 superseded combination; Assiminia lutea A. Adams, 1861 (misspelling of generic name)

Species of gastropod

Assiminea lutea is a species of small operculate snail, a marine gastropod mollusk or micromollusk in the family Assimineidae.

== Description ==
(Original description in Latin) The shell is cone-shaped. The spire is conical, elevated, and covered by a thin epidermis. The shell is pale yellow. It has 5½ whorls, which are scarcely convex. The body whorl is rounded. The umbilical region is impressed. The aperture is rounded-ovate. The outer lip is broad, spreading, and thickened above.

== Distribution ==
This species occurs in brackish waters of the estuary of the Pei-ho, Yellow Sea: also in the Russian Federation, Korea and Japan.

== Parasites ==
Parafossarulus anomalospiralis is the first intermediate host for:

- trematode Clonorchis sinensis
