= Oesophagicola =

Scientific classification
- Kingdom: Animalia
- Phylum: Platyhelminthes
- Class: Trematoda
- Order: Plagiorchiida
- Family: Opisthorchiidae
- Genus: Oesophagicola; Yamaguti, 1933
- Species: O. laticaudae

Binomial name
- Oesophagicola laticaudae Yamaguti, 1933

Genus of flukes

Oesophagicola is a monotypic genus of trematodes belonging to the family Opisthorchiidae. The only species is Oesophagicola laticaudae.
