= Opisthorchis =

Scientific classification
- Domain: Eukaryota
- Kingdom: Animalia
- Phylum: Platyhelminthes
- Class: Trematoda
- Order: Plagiorchiida
- Family: Opisthorchiidae
- Genus: Opisthorchis; Blanchard, 1895

Species
- See text

Genus of flukes

Opisthorchis is a genus of flukes in the family Opisthorchiidae.

== Species ==
Species in the genus Opisthorchis include:

- Opisthorchis chabaudi Bourgat & Kulo, 1977
- Opisthorchis felineus (Rivolta, 1884)
- Opisthorchis gomtii Mehra, 1941
- Opisthorchis parasiluri Long & Lee
- Opisthorchis viverrini Poirier, 1886

The species known as Clonorchis sinensis has sometimes been reclassified into the genus Opisthorchis.

== Etymology ==
From the Greek opisthen (behind) and orchis (testicle), Opisthorchis is a genus of trematode flatworms whose testes are located in the posterior end of the body. Sebastiano Rivolta is generally credited with discovering the first opisthorchid, which he named Distoma felineus, in a cat in Italy in 1884. However, the fluke may have been mentioned by Karl Rudolphi in 1819, and in 1831, Gurlt published a textbook that included a drawing of a fluke that was almost certainly Opisthorchis. By the end of the 19th century, Distoma contained so many species that Raphaël Blanchard introduced the genus Opisthorchis for elongated flat flukes with testes in the posterior end of the body. He chose Rivolta's Opisthorchis felineus as the type species.

== See also ==
- List of parasites (human)
