= Metorchis =

Scientific classification
- Kingdom: Animalia
- Phylum: Platyhelminthes
- Class: Trematoda
- Order: Plagiorchiida
- Family: Opisthorchiidae
- Genus: Metorchis; Looss, 1899

Genus of flatworms

Metorchis is a genus of flatworms belonging to the family Opisthorchiidae.

The species of this genus are found in Europe, Asia, Northern America.

Species:

- Metorchis bilis (Braun, 1790) Odening, 1962
- Metorchis butoridi Oshmarin, 1963
- Metorchis caintaensis Tubangui, 1928
- Metorchis coeruleus Braun, 1902
- Metorchis conjunctus (Cobbold, 1860) Looss, 1899
- Metorchis elegans Belogurov & Leonov, 1963
- Metorchis elongata Tang, He & Ren, 1990
- Metorchis felis Hsu, 1934
- Metorchis grusi Jiang & Wei, 1995
- Metorchis hovorkai Macko, 1955
- Metorchis neomidis Baer, 1932
- Metorchis nettioni Baugh, 1958
- Metorchis oesophagolongus Katsurada, 1914
- Metorchis orientalis Tanabe, 1920
- Metorchis taiwanensis Morishita & Tsuchimochi, 1925
- Metorchis tener Kowalewsky, 1903
- Metorchis xanthosomus (Creplin, 1846) Braun, 1902
- Metorchis xanthostomus (Creplin, 1846)
- Metorchis zacharovi Layman, 1926
