= Puntius spilopterus =

Scientific classification
- Domain: Eukaryota
- Kingdom: Animalia
- Phylum: Chordata
- Class: Actinopterygii
- Order: Cypriniformes
- Family: Cyprinidae
- Subfamily: Smiliogastrinae
- Genus: Puntius
- Species: P. spilopterus

Binomial name
- Puntius spilopterus (Fowler, 1934)

Synonyms
- Barbus spilopterus Fowler, 1934

Species of fish

Puntius spilopterus is a species of ray-finned fish in the genus Puntius. It is sometimes considered conspecific with Puntius brevis. It is found in the Chao Phraya basin in Thailand.
