= Tribendimidine =

Chemical compound

Clinical data
- ATC code: none

Identifiers
- IUPAC name: N,N-bis(4-(1-dimethylamino)ethylideneaminophenyl)-1,4; -phenylene dimethylidyneamine
- CAS Number: 115103-15-6
- PubChem CID: 3086564
- ChemSpider: 2343161
- UNII: YO6SOD6ZTJ
- ChEMBL: ChEMBL427256
- CompTox Dashboard (EPA): DTXSID50894077

Chemical and physical data
- Formula: C_{28}H_{32}N_{6}
- Molar mass: 452.606 g·mol^{−1}
- 3D model (JSmol): Interactive image
- SMILES: N(=C/c2ccc(\C=N\c1ccc(/N=C(/N(C)C)C)cc1)cc2)\c3ccc(\N=C(\N(C)C)C)cc3
- InChI: InChI=1S/C28H32N6/c1-21(33(3)4)31-27-15-11-25(12-16-27)29-19-23-7-9-24(10-8-23)20-30-26-13-17-28(18-14-26)32-22(2)34(5)6/h7-20H,1-6H3/b29-19+,30-20+,31-21+,32-22+; Key:XOIOGKHKNQYULW-HTNNXBMUSA-N

Tribendimidine is a broad-spectrum anthelmintic agent developed in China, at the National Institute of Parasitic Diseases in Shanghai. It is a derivative of amidantel.

In clinical trials, it was highly effective in treating ankylostomiasis, ascariasis and enterobiasis. It is also effective against clonorchiasis. However, animal studies suggest it is ineffective in treating Schistosoma mansoni or Fasciola hepatica disease. The drug has also performed well in trials against opisthorchiasis, curing about 70% of cases.

Tribendimidine is manufactured by Shandong Xinhua Pharmaceutical Company Limited in Zibo, Shandong, China. It was approved by the China Food and Drug Administration in 2007.
