= Mehlis gland =

Gland of reproductive system in Platyhelminthes

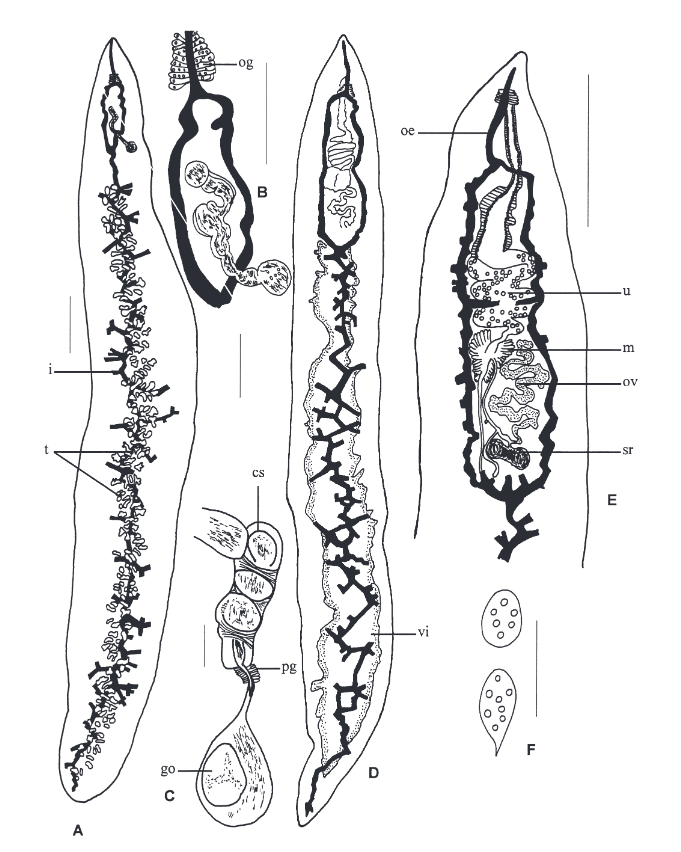
Internal anatomy of Dendritobilharzia pulverulenta. The Mehlis' gland is labelled m. (scale bars: A, D, E = 1 mm; B = 500 μm; C, F = 100 μm).

Mehlis gland ('mā-lis-) also called Shell gland, is primarily present surrounding the ootype of Platyhelminthes, and it is a part of the female reproductive organ of Platyhelminthes.

== Shape and size ==
It is a unicellular gland of egg shape. The shape of Mehli's gland is almost round or shell shaped and is attached with the ootype through certain fatty members.

== Etymology ==
It was so named as it was first discovered by German physician Karl Friedrich Eduard Mehlis (1796–1832).

== Function ==
As a part of female reproductive organ it has an important role in guiding the ova out towards the passage ending in the uterus of flat worms. Thus, its secretion lubricates the passage of uterus through which ova move. It may play a part in eggshell formation.

== See also ==
- Reproductive system of Trematoda
- Reproductive system of Flatworms
