= Clonorchiasis =

Infectious disease caused by fish parasites

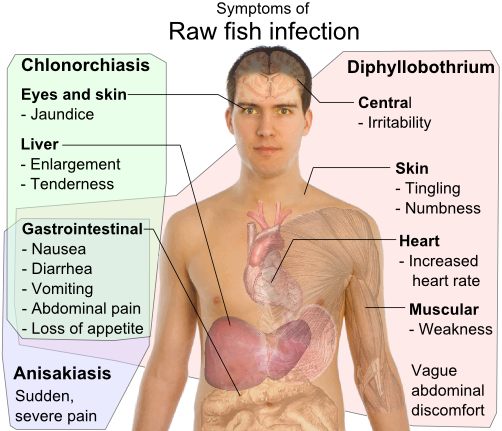
- Differential symptoms of parasite infection by raw fish: Clonorchis sinensis (a trematode/fluke), Anisakis (a nematode/roundworm) and Diphyllobothrium a (cestode/tapeworm), all have gastrointestinal, but otherwise distinct, symptoms.
- Specialty: Infectious diseases, medical parasitology, helminthologist

Clonorchiasis is an infectious disease caused by the Chinese liver fluke (Clonorchis sinensis) and two related species. Clonorchiasis is a known risk factor for the development of cholangiocarcinoma, a neoplasm of the biliary system.

Symptoms of opisthorchiasis caused by Opisthorchis viverrini and by O. felineus are indistinguishable from clonorchiasis caused by Clonorchis sinensis, leading some to argue that the disease by these three parasites should be referred to collectively as clonorchiasis.

== Signs and symptoms ==
Signs and symptoms vary depending on the extent and duration of the infestation. In mild cases, people may be asymptomatic or experience mild abdominal symptoms, while those who have been infected with more flukes for longer periods of time may experience fever, headache, dizziness, and tenderness and enlargement of the liver.

== Cause ==
Clonorchis sinensis is a trematode (fluke) which is part of the phylum Platyhelminthes. The parasitic worm is as long as 10 to 25 mm and lives in the bile ducts of the liver. It is a hermaphroditic fluke that requires two intermediate hosts. The eggs of the worms are passed in fecal matter into a body of water and are then ingested by mollusks. The water snail is the first intermediate host, in which a miracidium (an embryonated egg discharged in stool) goes through its developmental stages (sporocyst, rediae and cercariae). Freshwater fish are a second intermediate host for the parasitic worm. They become infected when the larva (cercaria) of the worm leaves the snail and penetrates the flesh of the fish. Humans then become infected by eating infected fish that has been undercooked, smoked, pickled, or salted, and from there the cycle repeats.

Clonorchiasis is endemic in the Far East, especially in Korea, Japan, Taiwan, and Southern China. Clonorchiasis has been reported in areas to which it is not endemic (including the United States). In such cases, the infection follows the ingestion of undercooked or pickled freshwater fish imported from one of the endemic areas and containing metacercariae.

== Diagnosis ==
Adult C. sinensis worms can inhabit the bile ducts of humans for 20–25 years without any clear clinical symptoms. This, in addition to the nonspecific symptoms infected persons may develop, can lead to missed diagnoses.

Patients are diagnosed when C. sinensis eggs are found in stools. The formalin-ether concentration technique (FECT) method of stool examination is most effective at diagnosing light cases of infection, while the Kato-Katz (KK) method is more suitable for the diagnosing of persons with clonorchiasis. Serological methods that use enzyme-linked immunosorbent assay (ELISA) can help differentiate the eggs of C. sinensis from other flukes.

== Prevention and control ==
The CDC recommends against eating raw, undercooked, or lightly salted, smoked, or pickled fish. The WHO recommends a combination of veterinary public health measures, education of food safety practices, and expanding access to anthelminthic drugs. The NHFPC of China has a recommendation similar to that of the WHO.

Health regulators including the FDA have established requirements on the freezing of fish intended for raw consumption. The European Union (EFSA) specifically require an extended time for fish suspected of containing Clonorchis or Opisthorchis compared to other parasites. According to WHO data, larvae of these two genera are killed by freezing at −10 °C (14 °F) for 5 days.

The EFSA recommends a cooking time of 30 minutes at 70 °C (158 °F) to kill the parasite.

== Treatment ==
Praziquantel is the treatment of choice for clonorchiasis.
