= Raphaël Blanchard =

French physician and naturalist

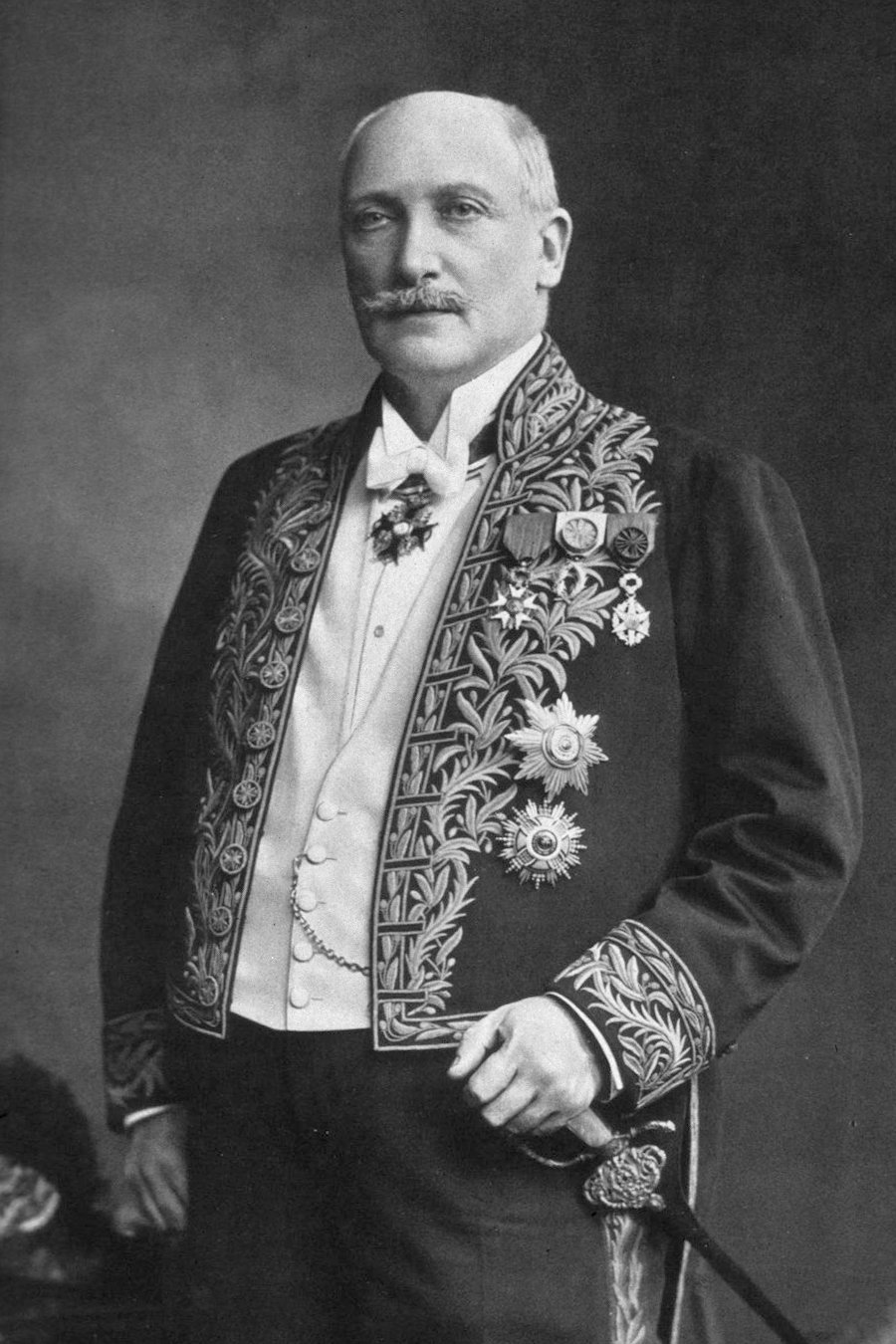
- Born: Raphaël Anatole Émile Blanchard; 28 February 1857; Saint-Christophe-sur-le-Nais, France
- Died: 7 February 1919 (aged 61); Paris, France

Raphaël Anatole Émile Blanchard (French pronunciation: [ʁafaɛl anatɔl emil blɑ̃ʃaʁ]; 28 February 1857 – 7 February 1919) was a French physician and naturalist who was a pioneer of medical zoology, with studies on parasites ranging from protozoa to worms and insects.

== Life and work ==
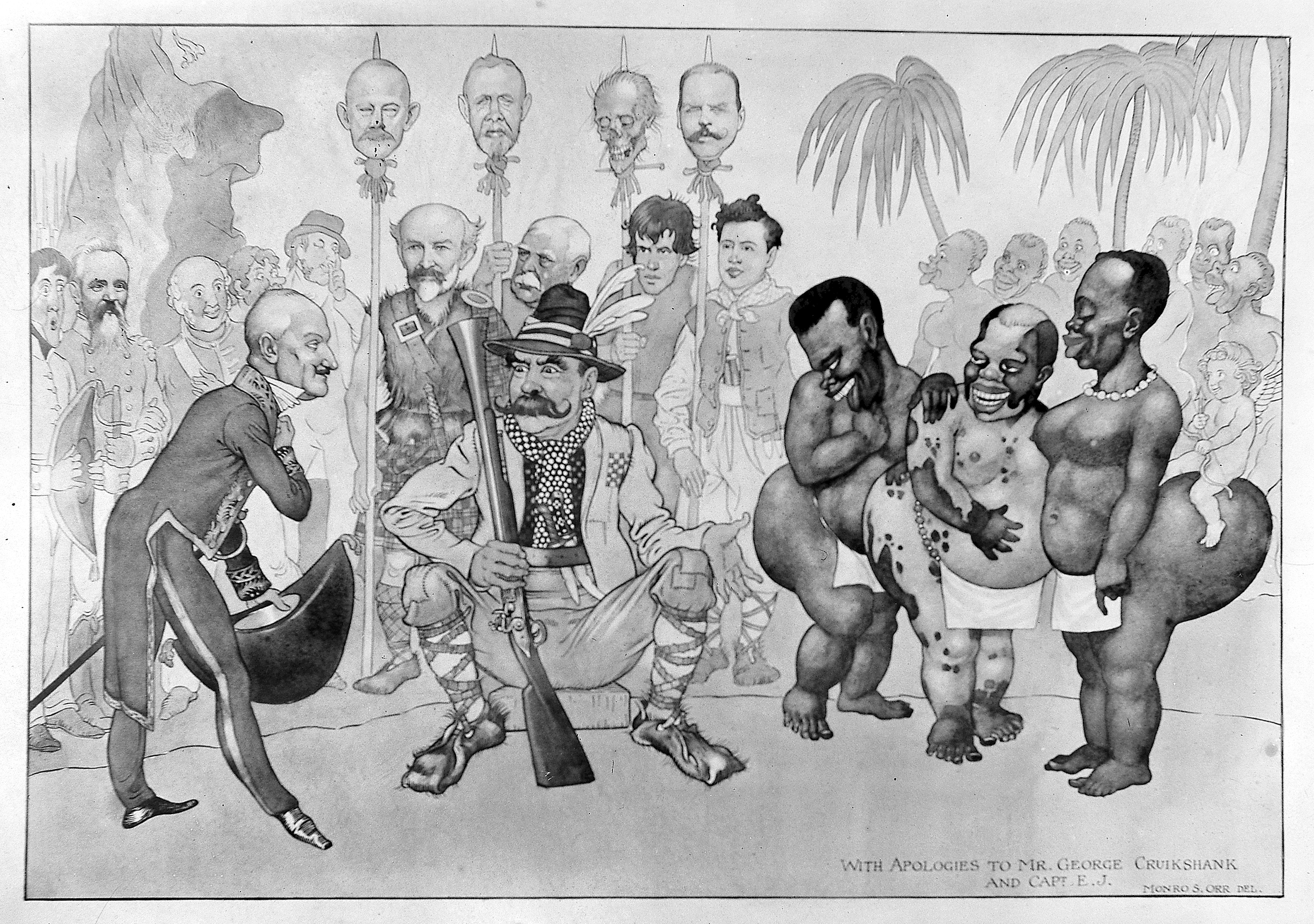
Caricature titled "A hunter offering a French gentleman three 'hottentot' (steatopygous) women; representing L. Sambon and Raphael Blanchard at an Anglo-French tropical medicine conference", watercolour by Munro Scott Orr after, 1913. Blanchard had written on steatopygy in African women in 1883 considering it atavistic following the scientific ideas of the period.

Blanchard was born in Saint-Christophe-sur-le-Nais where his father Rene was a poet and writer. He was a great grand nephew of the balloonist and parachute inventor Jean Pierre Blanchard. He went to study medicine in Paris in 1874. He became interested in zoology and worked at the laboratory at the École des Hautes-Études where he became a histological preparator for Charles Robin and Georges Pouchet, the latter influencing him towards studies on experimental teratology (inducing mutations and malformations). He travelled around Europe in 1877 with a grant from the Paris City Council, studying embryology in Vienna and comparative anatomy in Bonn. He received another grant in 1880 to study the organization of universities and biological education across Europe. He wrote a dissertation on anesthesia induced by nitrous oxide in 1880 under Paul Bert and received a medical degree. He became a professor of natural history at the faculty of medicine in Paris in 1883. In 1884 he also became a professor in the school of anthropology. He taught medical zoology from 1883 to 1887. He became interested in microbiology after studies at the Institut Pasteur in 1896 and took an interest in parasitology. He became chair of parasitology at the Academy of Medicine where he was elected full professor in 1897. He founded the journal Archives de parasitologie in 1898.

Blanchard founded along with others the Societe Zoologique de France in 1876 and served as its secretary general for twenty years. He organized the International Congress of Zoology from 1889 with Milne Edwards and was especially involved in the codes of zoological nomenclature. He became president of the ICZN in 1898. In 1889 he served as the secretary general for the 1st International Congress of Zoology in Paris alongside the Universal Exhibition. He was made officer of the Legion of Honor in 1912. Towards the end of his life he studied medical works from the Middle Ages including stone inscriptions.

== Works ==
- Centenaire de la Mort de Xavier Bichat, 1903
- Les moustiques. Histoire naturelle et médicale Paris, F.R. de Rudeval, 1905
- (with Paul Bert) Éléments de zoologie G. Masson (Paris), 1885.692 pages 613 illustrations in the text, 2 plates.
- Le ba’cubert : l’art populaire dans le Briançonnais, Librairie ancienne Honoré Champion, 1914, 90 p.
- (with Bui Van Quy) "Sur une collection d'amulettes chinoises" in Revue Anthropologique, 1918.

== Sources ==
- Evenhuis, N. L. 1997: Litteratura taxonomica dipterorum (1758–1930). Volume 1 (A-K); Volume 2 (L-Z). – Leiden, Backhuys Publishers 1; 2 VII+1-426; 427–871.
- Howard, L. O. 1930: History of applied Entomology (Somewhat Anecdotal). Smiths. Miscell. Coll. 84 X+1-564, 51 Taf
