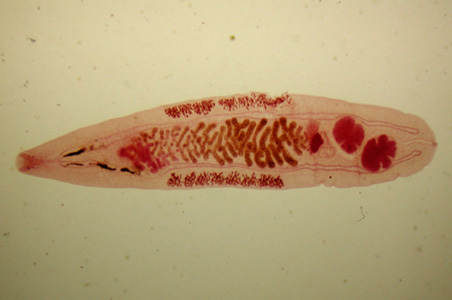

Scientific classification
- Kingdom: Animalia
- Phylum: Platyhelminthes
- Class: Trematoda
- Order: Plagiorchiida
- Family: Opisthorchiidae
- Genus: Opisthorchis
- Species: O. felineus

Binomial name
- Opisthorchis felineus (Rivolta, 1884) Blanchard, 1895

= Opisthorchis felineus =

Species of fluke

Opisthorchis felineus, the Siberian liver fluke or cat liver fluke, is a trematode parasite that infects the liver in mammals. It was first discovered in 1884 in a cat's liver by Sebastiano Rivolta of Italy. In 1891, Russian parasitologist, Konstantin Nikolaevich Vinogradov (1847–1906) found it in a human, and named the parasite a "Siberian liver fluke". In the 1930s, helminthologist Hans Vogel of Hamburg published an article describing the life cycle of Opisthorchis felineus. Felineus infections may also involve the pancreatic ducts. Diagnosis of Opisthorchis infection is based on microscopic identification of parasite eggs in stool specimens. Safe and effective medication is available to treat Opisthorchis infections. Adequately freezing or cooking fish will kill the parasite.

== Distribution ==
Distribution of Opisthorchis felineus include: Spain, Italy, Albania, Greece, France, North Macedonia, Switzerland, Germany, Poland, Russia, Turkey, and Caucasus.

== Life cycle ==
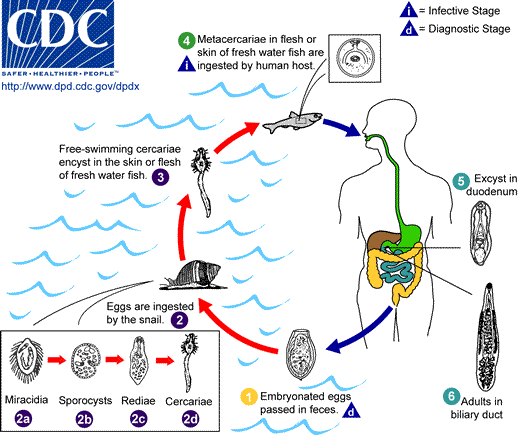
Life cycle of the cat liver fluke

The first intermediate hosts of the parasite are freshwater snails:

- Bithynia inflata (synonym: Codiella inflata)
- Bithynia troschelii
- Bithynia leachii
- Bithynia tentaculata

The second intermediate hosts are freshwater fish: Leuciscus idus, Tinca tinca, Abramis brama, white-eye bream Ballerus sapa, Barbus barbus, common carp Cyprinus carpio, Blicca bjoerkna, Leuciscus idus, Alburnus alburnus, Aspius aspius, and common rudd Scardinius erythropthalmus.

The definitive hosts are fish-eating mammals such as dogs, foxes, cats, rats, pigs, rabbits, seals, lions, wolverines, martens, polecats and humans.

== Effect on human health ==
It is estimated that 1.5 million people in Russia are infected with the parasite. Inhabitants of Siberia acquire the infection by consuming raw, slightly salted and frozen fish.

Opisthorchiasis, the disease caused by Opisthorchis felineus, ranges in severity from asymptomatic infection to severe illness. Patient outcome is dependent on early detection and treatment.

Human cases of opisthorchiasis may affect the liver, pancreas, and gall bladder. If not treated in the early stages, opisthorchiasis may cause cirrhosis of the liver and increased risk of liver cancer, but may be asymptomatic in children.

Two weeks after flukes enter the body, the parasites infect the biliary tract. Symptoms of infection include fever, general feeling of tiredness, skin rash, and gastrointestinal disturbances. Severe anemia and liver damage may also incapacitate the infected person for 1–2 months. Treatment of opisthorchiasis is generally with a single dose of praziquantel.

== See also ==
- List of parasites (human)
