= Trematodiasis =

Trematodiases
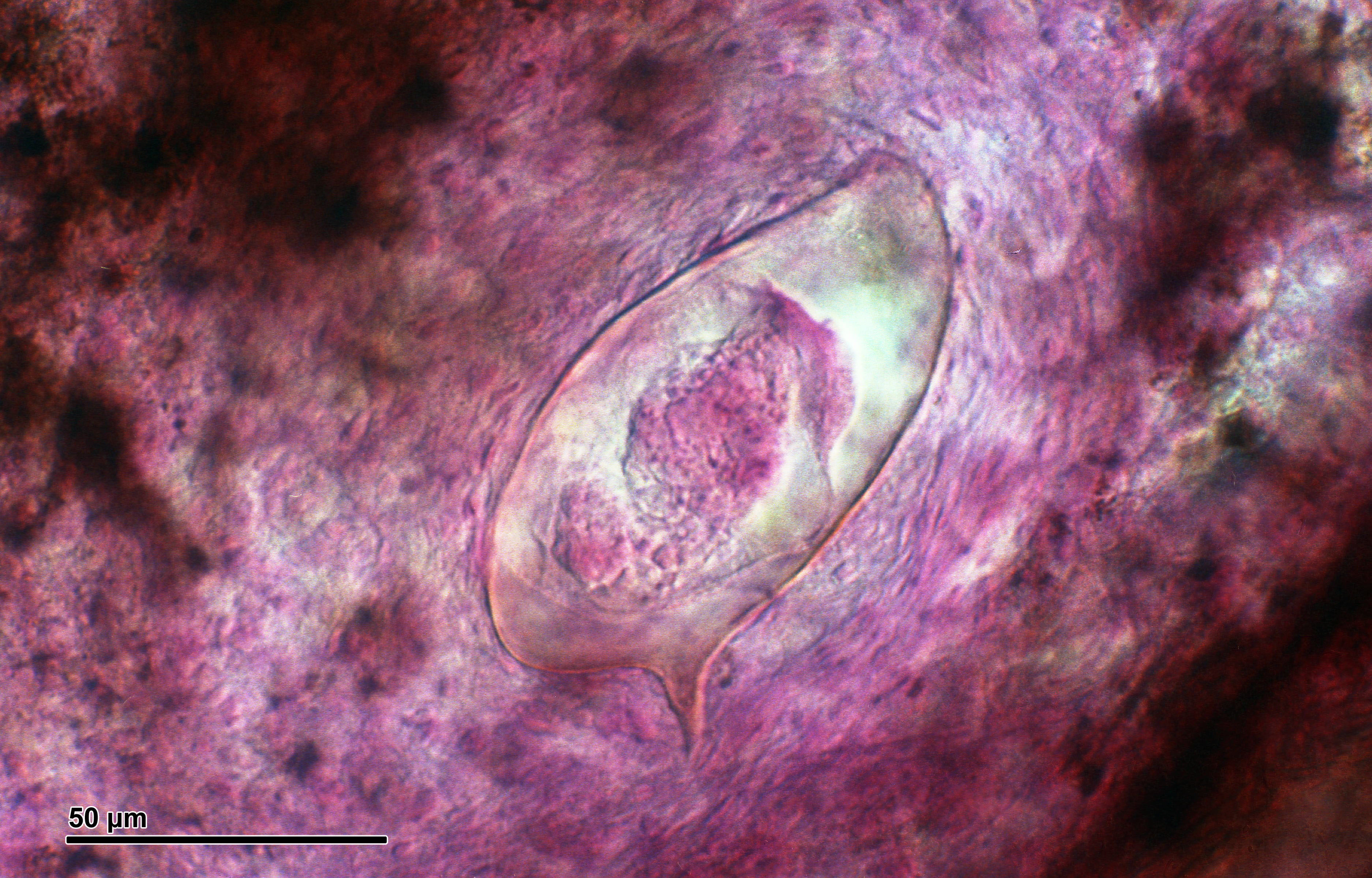
- Egg of trematode, Schistosoma sp., found in liver tissue
- Specialty: Infectious disease
- Symptoms: Chest pain, Abdominal pain, Fever, digestion issues, Cough, Diarrhea, change in appetite
- Causes: Trematoda
- Diagnostic method: Immunodiagnosis, Parasitological diagnosis
- Prevention: Education, food safety practices
- Medication: Praziquantel, Triclabendazole
- Frequency: 200000 (2018)
- Deaths: 7000 (2018)

Trematodiasis is a group of parasitic infections caused by different species of flukes, in humans mainly by digenean trematodes. Symptoms can range from mild to severe depending on the species, number and location of trematodes in the infected organism. Symptoms depend on the type of trematode present, and include chest and abdominal pain, high temperature (fever), digestion issues, cough and shortness of breath (dyspnea), diarrhoea and change in appetite.

Trematodiases can be transmitted through food or water that contains larval forms of the parasite. Infections can be transmitted through aquatic organisms which act as a host for the maturity of the parasite. Foodborne trematodiasis is transmitted when organisms ingest contaminated undercooked food including aquatic plants and organisms. Other trematodiases caused by the blood flukes of the genus Schistosoma are transmitted by contact with water contaminated by swimming larvae of a different stage of development or infective stage than in foodborne trematodes. This article focuses on foodborne trematodiases.

Trematodiases can be prevented and controlled through public health programs aimed at educating people about how contaminated water and food can lead to infections. Education programs include raising awareness about the transmission of trematodiases through the consumption of food that is not cooked well such as fish, molluscs, and other aquatic animals and plants. Sanitation and distribution of clean water are also used to control the spread of trematodiases on a larger scale.

Foodborne trematodiases that involve the lung, liver and intestines are classified as a neglected tropical disease, as is schistosomiasis. Cases of trematodiases that can be transmitted through food has affected over 70 countries globally, with the most impacted countries located in Latin America and Asia. According to the World Health Organization recorded that there are approximately 200,000 cases of foodborne trematodiases that are caused by four kinds of trematodes: Clonorchis, Fasciola, Opisthorchis, and Paragonimus. The majority of cases are from East and Southeast Asia. Schistosomiasis is an environmentally-acquired trematodiasis accounting for over 200 million cases annually, most of which are in Africa. The urinary blood fluke (Schistosoma haematobium), the Southeast Asian liver fluke (Opisthorchis viverrini) and the Chinese liver fluke (Clonorchis sinensis) are recognised by the International Agency for Research on Cancer as a Group 1 biological carcinogens in humans.

== Signs and symptoms ==
Most cases of trematodiases show no symptoms. Infected organisms that show symptoms will range in severity depending on the number of parasites. When the number of trematodes is high, signs of infection include severe pain in the abdomen. The signs and symptoms of the disease is also impacted by the location and spread of the parasite in the body. Tissues in organs are damaged when infected by the parasite. This damage can be mechanical as the parasite attaches to the walls of the host, as well as chemical.

Symptoms of lung fluke infections (Paragonimus) depend on the parasite’s stage in its life cycle, and how it travels around in the lung. Trematodiases that impact the lungs can cause cough, headache, chest pain, high temperature and change in appetite.

Intestinal trematodiases infect the gastrointestinal tract. Symptoms of intestinal fluke infections can range from mild to severe symptoms depending on the length of time that the parasite spends in the body. Signs and symptoms that arise in infected organisms include headache, indigestion problems such as diarrhoea, high temperature, and pain in the abdomen which can also lead to malnutrition as the infected organism’s appetite is lost. In intestinal trematodiases, the walls of the intestine can be damaged, which can lead to ulcers in some infected organisms.

Trematodiases caused by liver trematodes infect the host’s liver, gall bladder and bile duct and can cause inflammation within these organs. Symptoms vary from case to case and include abdominal pain, loss of appetite, problems with indigestion including diarrhoea and constipation, whereas in some cases, no symptoms are shown. Opisthorchis viverrini damages the bile duct when in the adult stage of the life cycle, forming the cancer cholangiocarcinoma.

Blood flukes can cause the trematodiases schistosomiasis which can cause reactions on skin. When infected, the host can also experience symptoms such as nausea, lack of appetite, diarrhoea, and abdominal pain.

== Causes ==
Trematodiases are zoonotic infections caused by trematodes. In foodborne trematodiases, these parasites are transferred from animals to humans. Transmission of trematodiases can occur through the consumption of water and food that is contaminated with trematodes in the larval stages of their life cycle. In a host organism, eggs of trematodes can spread through faeces, and sputum if the host is infected by a lung fluke. Once these reach water, they infect aquatic snails which act as intermediate hosts for trematodiases that are transmitted through food. A second host will depend on the species of trematode, and are usually aquatic animals Some trematodiases such as schistosomiasis can also be transmitted when the skin comes in contact with water containing the parasite. Trematodes all have different life cycles in which they can reproduce asexually and sexually. When trematodes are at the metacercariae stage in their life cycle, humans and other definitive hosts such as mammals and birds can be infected. In humans, adult trematodes can survive for 25 years.

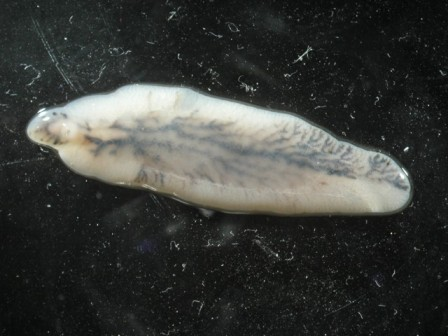
Fasciola hepatica, a species of trematode that causes trematodiases, and infects the liver

=== Types of trematodiases ===
There are different types of trematodiases depending on the species of trematode that has infected the organism as well as their location in humans. There are over 80 different species of trematodes that are transmitted through food that can cause infections in humans. Foodborne trematodiases include intestinal flukes, lung flukes, and liver flukes. Liver flukes cause liver disease in humans and are caused by the species Clonorchis, Opisthorchis and Fasciola. Intestinal flukes infect the gastrointestinal tract and can be caused by the species such as Fasciolopsis buski, Echinostoma, Metagonimus, Heterophyes, and Gastrodiscoides. Lung flukes, mainly the genus, Paragonimus, infect the lungs of organisms, causing infections that can last for up to 20 years in humans. Foodborne trematodiases include clonorchiasis, opisthorchiasis, fascioliasis and paragonimiasis.

== Diagnosis ==
Trematodiases can be diagnosed through a variety of methods. One of these is known as parasitological diagnosis, which relies on lab tests that detect the presence of trematode eggs where samples are taken from faeces or sputum. Techniques used to measure the number of eggs in samples taken from infected organisms include FLOTAC, Kato-Katz, formalin-ethyl-acetate. Different techniques have a different degree in which they can accurately detect eggs of trematodes, and some of these may not be able to detect low amounts. Using a variety of these techniques on different samples can strengthen the accuracy of this method.

Another method in which trematodiases can be diagnosed is through antibodies that are produced by the host’s immune response when infected. This is known as immunodiagnosis. These antibody tests can be highly specific, or not specific at all, depending on the technique used.

Molecular diagnosis is also used to detect trematodiases. This is specific as it uses the methods of polymerase chain reactions, pyrosequencing and other techniques to detect the parasite’s DNA in samples. It is suitable for detecting infections regardless of their number.

Radiological examinations use imaging such as CT scans, X-rays, and ultrasounds to detect certain species of the parasite. For liver fluke infections, ultrasounds are commonly used to search for evidence of the infection in the body. It is not very specific in diagnosing the exact trematode that has infected the organism.

== Prevention ==
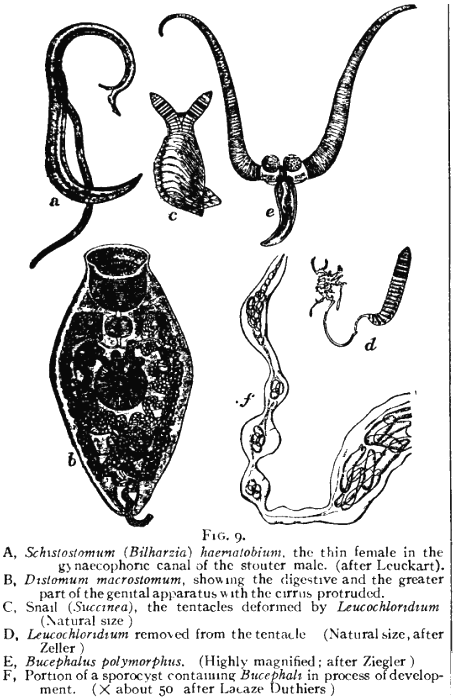
Species of trematodes that can cause trematodiases

Prevention strategies aim to reduce the number of cases of trematodiases globally and lower infection rates, alongside stopping reinfection of individuals who have been infected before. Public health programs are necessary prevention strategies that aim to raise awareness about the transmission and cause of trematodiases. Food safety and hygiene practices are also implemented to reduce transmission of the parasites through food and water.

Most trematodiases are transmitted through eating raw aquatic plants and animals such as fish, crustaceans, crabs, watercress, frogs, and snails. Health education programs aim to outline how transmission of disease can be prevented by raising awareness of food safety practices. This includes spreading information about the importance of heating food to eliminate the chance of contracting trematodiases, as well as the importance of cleaning utensils, cutting boards, and other equipment to prevent cross-contamination. These education programs are also used to raise awareness in retailers to prevent consumers from infections. The Food and Drug Administration recommends that fish that will be consumed undercooked should be placed in low temperatures and frozen under −20 degrees Celsius for at least a week, or under −35 degrees Celsius for a minimum of 15 hours, as freezing removes any chance of transmitting parasites to consumers.

Data from previous years can also be used to create mathematical models to predict how the disease is transmitted, and where one can effectively intervene to stop the increase in cases. Improving access to clean water also helps prevent the transmission of trematodiases through the water. Water sanitation and treatment of sewerage are used to prevent the continuation of the cycle of infections.

There is no vaccine for foodborne trematodiases that can be used to prevent infections. The World Health Organization has implemented various methods to control the rates of infection by mapping data in endemic areas and reviewing implemented activities by monitoring infection and incidence rates.

== Treatment ==
Chemical structure of Praziquantel, a chemotherapy drug used to treat most forms of trematodiases.

Treatment varies depending on the number of cases in an area. Chemotherapy drugs praziquantel and triclabendazole can be used in different amounts depending on the type of trematode infecting the organism, and its location in the body. 600,000 cases globally received treatment for foodborne trematodiases in 2016.

Praziquantel can act on a broad range of trematodes by disrupting the homeostasis of calcium ions and is used to treat liver, intestinal, and lung fluke infections. It was introduced as a treatment option in 1975 and targets various trematodiases by impacting the trematode’s ability to move in the host. Adverse reactions to this treatment that may occur are mild, and include headache, abdominal pain and dizziness. Although it is very effective and safe in treating most trematodiases, praziquantel can cause hypersensitivity or allergic reactions in rare cases. It also cannot be used to treat the trematodiasis fascioliasis.

Triclabendazole is a narrow-spectrum treatment of trematodiases and is commonly used to treat fascioliasis. This anthelminthic is effective against the species Fasciola and Paragonimus. Although it has been used in domestic livestock since 1983, the treatment was only approved for use in humans in 1997 in Egypt. In 2019, it was approved by the US Food and Drug Administration for treating cases of human infections. Common adverse reactions to triclabendazole include dizziness, sweating, pain in the abdomen, headaches, and biliary colic, which is mainly caused by the removal of dead trematodes from the body’s hepatobiliary system.

Preventive chemotherapy is a strategy used in areas where the number of cases and infection rates are very high, as all individuals in the given area are treated with medicine for trematodiases. This is used as an option to prevent further spread of the infection. For clonorchiasis and opisthorchiasis, when the incidence of cases exceeds 20%, all individuals are treated every year.

== Epidemiology ==
Trematodiases that infect the lung, liver and intestine are classified as neglected tropical diseases by the World Health Organization. Neglected tropical diseases are made up of bacterial, parasitic and viral infections that negatively impact the development of children, pregnancy and economic outcomes of developing countries.

Changes in population numbers, food distribution channels, poverty and health education programs contribute to the fluctuating epidemiological patterns. Social, ecological and economic factors also change distribution patterns globally. Factors such as rainfall, pollution, climate, vegetation, water temperature, and quality change the interactions between trematodes and their hosts. The expansion of aquaculture production and irrigation systems has also changed the spread of the disease. In areas where water is not sufficiently sanitised, infection rates have increased.

The World Health Organization declares that there are approximately 200,000 cases per year, leading to over 7000 deaths. The highest number of foodborne trematodiasis cases and the highest disease burden were recorded in East and Southeast Asia in 2019. In northeast Thailand, Opisthorchis viverrini, which is carcinogenic, is present in high numbers, and over 20,000 lives are lost a year due to cholangiocarcinoma caused by the trematode.

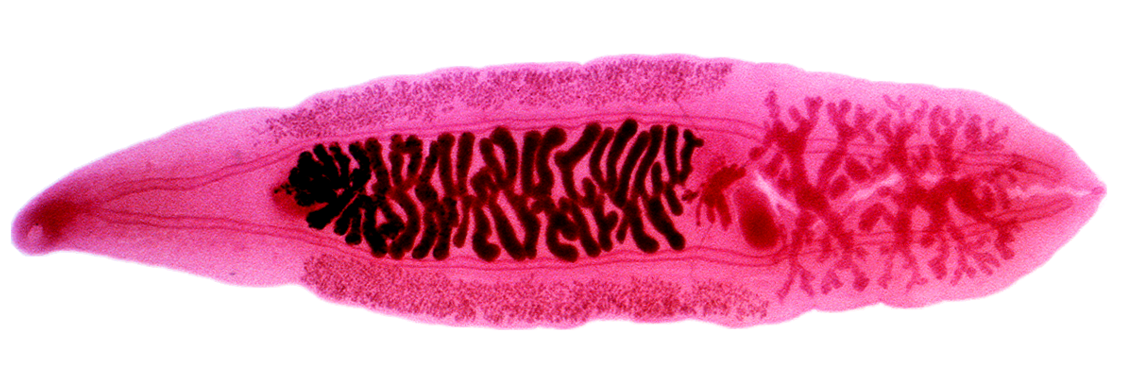
Clonorchis sinesis, a species which causes trematodiases that infect the liver

Clonorchis sinensis and Opisthorchis viverrini are two species that can cause trematodiases that infect the liver. These are more prevalent in males than females, and more common in adults than children. Fasciola hepatica, a species of liver flukes, has a higher incidence rate in children and females, with more cases of lung fluke and intestinal trematodiases in children. Cases of liver and lung fluke trematodiasis are frequent due to the length of time the trematode can live in host organisms, and increased chances of reinfection.

An increase in travel and increased popularity of traditional dishes such as raw oysters, crab meat, pickled seafood, and other undercooked aquatic plants have also contributed to the rise in cases of trematodiases. The Global Burden of Disease Study carried out in 2016 estimated that approximately 75 million people were impacted by trematodiases and around 2 million disability-adjusted life years were lost to the disease, due to damage caused by the infection.
