= Christopher Wade (researcher) =

British evolutionary biologist

Christopher M. Wade
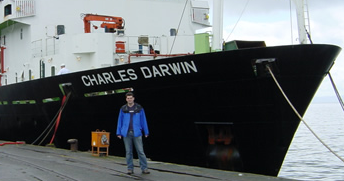
- Wade prior to North Atlantic research cruise of the RRS Charles Darwin in Fairlie, Scotland.
- Education: University of Wales (BSc) University of Edinburgh (PhD)
- Scientific career
- Workplaces: University of Nottingham Natural History Museum University of Edinburgh University of Wales
- Website: www.nottingham.ac.uk/life-sciences/people/chris.wade

Christopher M. Wade ^{FLS} is an evolutionary biologist and parasitologist at the University of Nottingham. Wade is an elected Fellow of the Linnean Society and is currently a visiting professor at Chulalongkorn University (2010–Present).

== Education ==
Wade undertook his undergraduate studies at the University of Wales and joined the University of Edinburgh for his graduate studies, earning his PhD in 1997 for his research on the evolution of HIV.

== Career and research ==
Wade began his career as a postdoctoral research fellow at the University of Nottingham in 1996, and subsequently was a research fellow at The Natural History Museum, London in 1999. In 2001, Wade joined the University of Nottingham as a lecturer in Genetics. As of 2024, Wade is a lecturer in the School of Life Sciences at the University of Nottingham, where he lectures and researches molecular phylogenetics and evolution and parasitology.

Wade studies the evolution, population genetics and taxonomy of aquatic and terrestrial snails and slugs and investigates snail-borne parasitic diseases of medical and veterinary importance (including Schistosomiasis, Angiostrongyliasis and Fascioliasis). Wade also researches the evolution and biogeography of marine taxa focusing on Foraminifera and fish. As of 2024, Wade has over 100 scientific publications (including articles published in Nature and Science), with an average of 50 citations per publication (>5000 citations; h-index: 40; i-10 index = 69). Wade has published research articles on several different topics such as determining the evolutionary relationships and taxonomy in terrestrial and aquatic snails and slugs; studying the intermediate gastropod hosts capable of transmitting gastropod-borne helminthic diseases to humans and animals; examining the evolution and biogeography of planktic and benthic foraminifera and seasonal variations in coastal populations; and the molecular phylogeography of fish populations.

Together with colleague Kate Darling, Wade demonstrated that foraminifera exchange genes globally, with gene flow between the Arctic and Antarctic and the Pacific and Atlantic, yet individual species are highly diverse and composed of multiple 'cryptic' species groups. They demonstrated that shell coiling is a genetic trait, not the result of ecophenotypic variation, and that foraminifera survive mass extinction events by bridging the benthic-planktic divide.

Wade's research on snail evolution produced the seminal molecular phylogenies for the terrestrial and aquatic snails and slugs, used in establishing a new taxonomy of the Gastropoda, and his work on schistosomiasis in aquatic snails has mapped the prevalence of disease along the shorelines of Lake Victoria and Lake Albert in East Africa and in West Africa.

== Present and past collaborations ==
Wade currently has active collaborations with researchers in the United Kingdom (LSTM and the Natural History Museum), India (Kerala Forest Research Institute), Pakistan (COMSATS University), the Philippines (University of the Philippines), Vietnam (Vietnam National Museum of Nature), Thailand (Chulalongkorn University), Kenya (Karen) and The Gambia (National Public Health Laboratories and the Molecular Diagnostics Laboratory).
