= Calicophoron daubneyi =

Scientific classification
- Kingdom: Animalia
- Phylum: Platyhelminthes
- Class: Trematoda
- Order: Plagiorchiida
- Family: Paramphistomidae
- Genus: Calicophoron
- Species: C. daubneyi

Binomial name
- Calicophoron daubneyi Dinnik, 1962

Synonyms
- Paramphistomum daubneyi; Paramphistomum daubnei

Species of fluke

Calicophoron daubneyi is a species of digenetic trematode in the family Paramphistomidae. The parasite is commonly found infecting cattle, sheep and goats in France, Spain, Portugal, Italy, United Kingdom, Republic of Ireland, Belgium, Netherlands and Germany.

== Hosts ==
- Intermediate hosts include Galba truncatula or Omphiscola glabra
- Final hosts include Sheep, Goats and Cattle.
