= Calicophoron =

Scientific classification
- Kingdom: Animalia
- Phylum: Platyhelminthes
- Class: Trematoda
- Order: Plagiorchiida
- Family: Paramphistomidae
- Genus: Calicophoron; Nasmark, 1937

Genus of flatworms

Calicophoron is a genus of flatworms belonging to the family Paramphistomidae.

The genus has almost cosmopolitan distribution.

Species:

- Calicophoron daubneyi Dinnik, 1962
- Calicophoron microbothrioides (Price & McIntosh, 1949)
