= Amphistomiasis =

- Other names: Paramphistomiasis, amphistomosis, paramphistomosis
- Specialty: Infectious disease

Amphistomiasis is a parasitic disease of livestock animals, more commonly of cattle and sheep, and humans caused by immature helminthic flatworms belonging to the order Echinostomida. The term amphistomiasis is used for broader connotation implying the disease inflicted by members of Echinostomida including the family Paramphistomidae/Gastrodiscidae (to be precise, the species Gastrodiscoides hominis); whereas paramphistomiasis is restricted to that of the members of the family Paramphistomidae only. G. discoides and Watsonius watsoni are responsible for the disease in humans, while most paramphistomes are responsible in livestock animals, and some wild mammals. In livestock industry the disease causes heavy economic backlashes due to poor production of milk, meat and wool.

== Signs and symptoms ==
Symptoms include:

- Physical weakness, emaciation or lethargy
- Foul smell of faeces, greasy consistency and scour or diarrhoea
- Anorexia, refusal to eat food
- Dehydration and frequent drinking of water
- Submaxillary oedema (bottle jaw) and pale mucous membrane
- Intestinal bleeding (haemorrhagic enteritis) with anaemia and low blood protein (hypoproteinaemia)
- Damage to the bile duct, and liver cirrhosis
- In humans (specifically gastrodiscoidiasis) symptoms include diarrhoea, fever, abdominal pain, colic, and an increased mucus production. Large amounts of eggs can cause tissue reactions in the heart or mesenteric lymphatics, which may lead to death. Mortality among native Assamese children is attributed to this infection.

== Cause ==
Amphistomiasis in farm and wild mammals is due to infection of paramphistomes, such as the species of Paramphistomum, Calicophoron, Cotylophoron, Pseudophisthodiscus, etc. These are essentially rumen flukes, of which Paramphistomum cervi is the most notorious in terms of prevalence and pathogenicity. Infection occurs through ingestion of contaminated vegetables and raw meat, in which the viable infective metacercaria are deposited from snails, which are the intermediate hosts. The immature flukes are responsible for destroying the mucosal walls of the alimentary tract on their way to growing into adults. It is by this fervent tissue obliteration that the clinical symptoms are manifested. The adult flukes, on the other hand, are quite harmless, as they merely prepare for reproduction.

The zoonotic infection in human is caused by G. discoides and W. watsoni which are essentially intestinal flukes. The disease due to G. discoides is more specifically termed gastrodiscoidiasis. In their natural hosts such as pigs and monkeys, their infection in asymptomatic, but human infection is prevalent, by which they cause serious health problems, characterised by diarrhoea, fever, abdominal pain, colic, and an increased mucous production. In extreme situations such as in Assam, India, a number of mortality among children is attributed to this disease.

== Pathogenesis ==
Adult flukes are known to be quite harmless, as they do not attack on the host tissue. It is the immature flukes which are most damaging as they get attached to the intestinal wall, literally and actively sloughing off of the tissue. This necrosis is indicated by haemorrhage in faeces, which in turn is a sign of severe enteritis. Under such condition the animals become anorexic and lethargic. It is often accompanied by pronounced diarrhoea, dehydration, oedema, polydipsia, anaemia, listlessness and weight loss. In sheep profuse diarrhoea usually develops two to four weeks after initial infection. If infection is not properly attended death can ensue within 20 days, and in a farm mortality can be very high. In fact there are intermittent reports of mortality as high as 80% among sheep and cattle. Sometimes chronic form is also seen with severe emaciation, anaemia, rough coat, mucosal oedema, thickened duodenum and oedema in the sub maxillary space. The terminally sick animals lie prostrate on the ground, completely emaciated until they die. In buffalos, severe haemorrhage was found to be associated with liver cirrhosis and nodular hepatitis.

== Diagnosis ==
Under most situations, infection is hard to recognize because the symptoms are mild or even absent. In humans and wild animals, infection is not easily identified. Especially the adult flukes, even if in large number, generally do not cause complications. There is not yet a standard diagnostic test. Therefore, manual diagnosis is done at many levels. Diagnosis basically relies on a combination of postmortem analyses, clinical signs displayed by the animals, and response to drenching. In heavy infection, symptoms are easily observed in sheep and cattle as they become severely anorexic or inefficiently digest food, and become unthrifty. Copious fetid diarrhea is an obvious indication, as the soiling of hind legs and tails with fluid feces are readily noticeable.

Even though it not always the case, immature flukes can be identified from the fluid excrement. On rare occasions, eggs can be identified from stools of suspected animals. In developing countries diagnosis and prognosis is often hindered by multiple infections with other trematodes, such as Fasciola hepatica and schistosomes, because these flukes are given primary importance due to their pervasive nature.

== Treatment ==
Amphistomiasis is considered a neglected tropical disease, with no prescription drug for treatment and control. Therefore, management of infestation is based mainly on control of the snail population, which transmit the infective larvae of the flukes. However, there are now drugs shown to be effective including resorantel, oxyclozanide, clorsulon, ivermectin, niclosamide, bithional and levamisole. An in vitro demonstration shows that plumbagin exhibits high efficacy on adult flukes.

Since the juvenile flukes are the causative individuals of the disease, effective treatment means control of the immature fluke population. Prophylaxis is therefore based on disruption of the environment (such as proper drainage) where the carrier snails inhabit, or more drastic action of using molluscicides to eradicate the entire population. For treatment of the infection, drugs effective against the immature flukes are recommended for drenching. For this reason oxyclozanide is advocated as the drug of choice. It effectively kills the flukes within a few hours and it effective against the flukes resistant to other drugs. The commercially prescribed dosage is 5 mg/kg body weight or 18.7 mg/kg body weight in two divided dose within 72 hours. Niclosamide is also extensively used in mass drenching of sheep. Successfully treated sheep regain appetite within a week, diarrhoea stops in about three days, and physiological indicators (such as plasma protein and albumin levels) return to normal in a month.
