= Cercaria (genus) =

Scientific classification
- Kingdom: Animalia
- Phylum: Platyhelminthes
- Class: Trematoda
- Order: Plagiorchiida
- Family: Fellodistomidae
- Genus: Cercaria; Müller, 1773

Genus of trematodes

Cercaria is the name of a genus of trematodes in the subclass Digenea. It is used as a placeholder genus when the species description is based on the cercarial life stage and the adult forms are not known.

== List ==
Species:

- Cercaria armata Tang, 1990
- Cercaria brevicaeca Cort, 1914
- Cercaria brookoveri Faust, 1918
- Cercaria burti Miller, 1923
- Cercaria caryi Cort, 1914
- Cercaria chrysenterica Miller, 1923
- Cercaria cloacicola Tang, 1990
- Cercaria columbiensis Edwards & Jansch, 1955
- Cercaria dermolestes McLeod, 1940
- Cercaria diastropha Cort, 1914
- Cercaria dipterocerca Miller & Northup, 1926
- Cercaria douglasi Cort, 1917
- Cercaria douthitti Cort, 1914
- Cercaria elegans Tang, 1992
- Cercaria elongata Brackett, 1940
- Cercaria elvae Miller, 1923
- Cercaria emarginatae Cort, 1917
- Cercaria gedoelsti Tang, 1990
- Cercaria gyrauli Brackett, 1940
- Cercaria hamata Miller, 1923
- Cercaria hemilophura Cort, 1914
- Cercaria hezuiensis Tang, 1996
- Cercaria himasthloides Tang, 1990
- Cercaria hongkongensis Tang, 1990
- Cercaria inhabilis Cort, 1914
- Cercaria isocotylea Cort, 1914
- Cercaria laevicardi
- Cercaria leptacantha Cort, 1914
- Cercaria linearis Lespès, 1857
- Cercaria littorinae Rees, 1935
- Cercaria longicauda Tang, 1990
- Cercaria magnicaudata Tang, 1990
- Cercaria megalura Cort, 1914
- Cercaria mesostephanus Tang, 1990
- Cercaria milfordensis Uzmann, 1953
- Cercaria minus Tang, 1990
- Cercaria mortoni Tang, 1990
- Cercaria multicellulata Miller, 1923
- Cercaria myae Uzmann, 1952
- Cercaria oregonensis Macfarlane & Macy, 1946
- Cercaria owreae (Hutton, 1954) Dawes, 1959
- Cercaria parvicaudata Stunkard & Shaw, 1931
- Cercaria pernaviridis Tang, 1992
- Cercaria pleurolophocerca Sonsino, 1892
- Cercaria polyadena Cort, 1914
- Cercaria reflexae Cort, 1914
- Cercaria rubra Cort, 1914
- Cercaria shanghaiensis Komiya, 1941
- Cercaria spelotremoides Tang, 1990
- Cercaria stagnicolae Talbot, 1936
- Cercaria sturniae Tanabe, 1951
- Cercaria tenax Müller, 1773
- Cercaria tenuis Miller, 1923
- Cercaria trigonura Cort, 1914
- Cercaria ubiquitoides Stunkard, 1932
- Cercaria viridis Müller, 1786
- Cercaria wardi Miller, 1923
