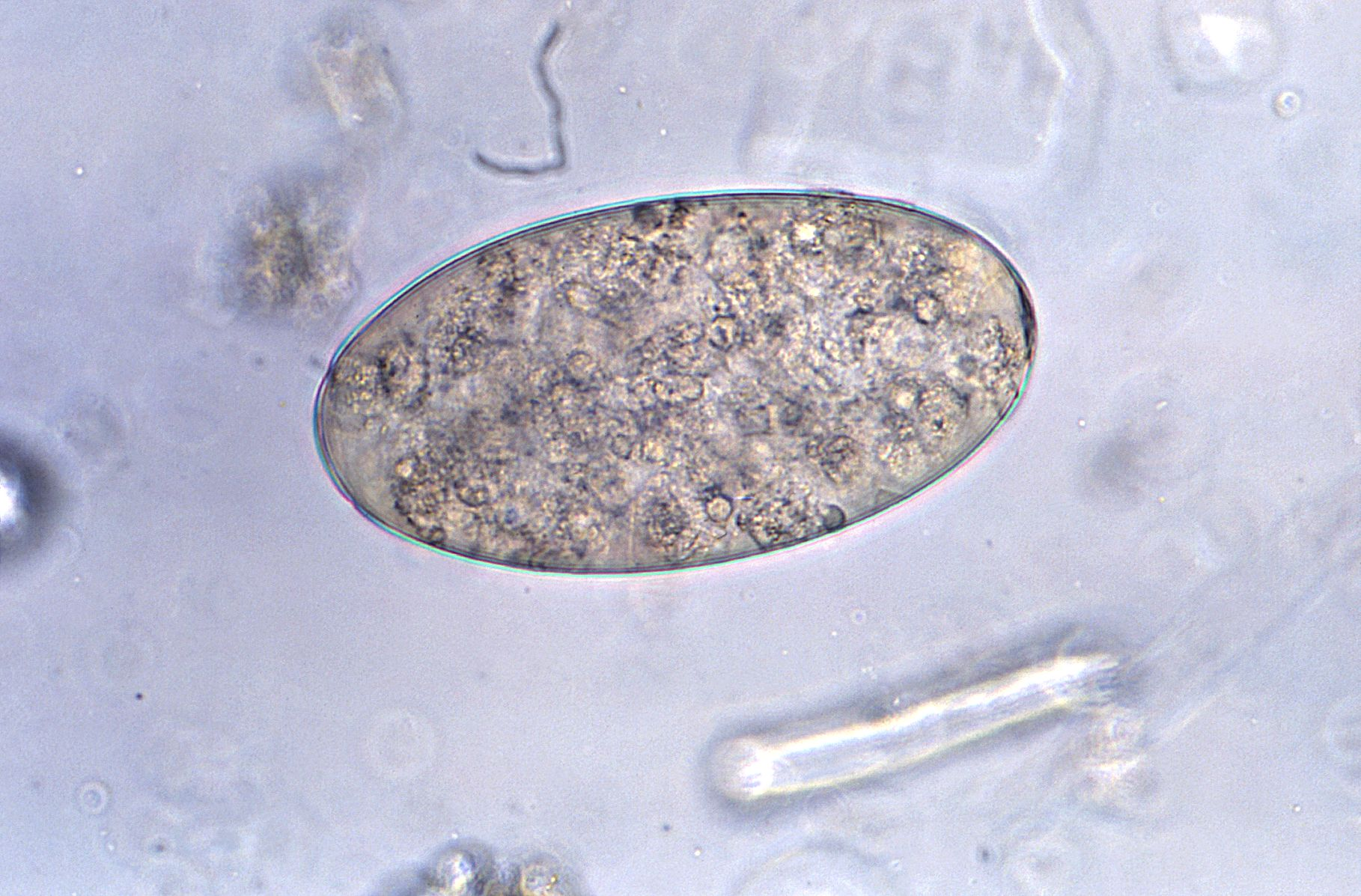
- Fasciolopsis buski egg

Scientific classification
- Kingdom: Animalia
- Phylum: Platyhelminthes
- Class: Trematoda
- Order: Plagiorchiida
- Family: Fasciolidae
- Genus: Fasciolopsis; Looss, 1899
- Species: F. buski

Binomial name
- Fasciolopsis buski Morakote & Yano, 1990

= Fasciolopsis =

Genus of flukes

Fasciolopsis (/ˌfæsioʊˈlɒpsɪs, fəˌsaɪ-/) is a genus of trematodes. They are also known as giant intestinal flukes.

Only one species is recognised: Fasciolopsis buski. It is a notable parasite of medical importance in humans and veterinary importance in pigs. It is prevalent in Southern and Eastern Asia. The term for infestation with Fasciolopsis is fasciolopsiasis.

== Fasciolopsis buski ==
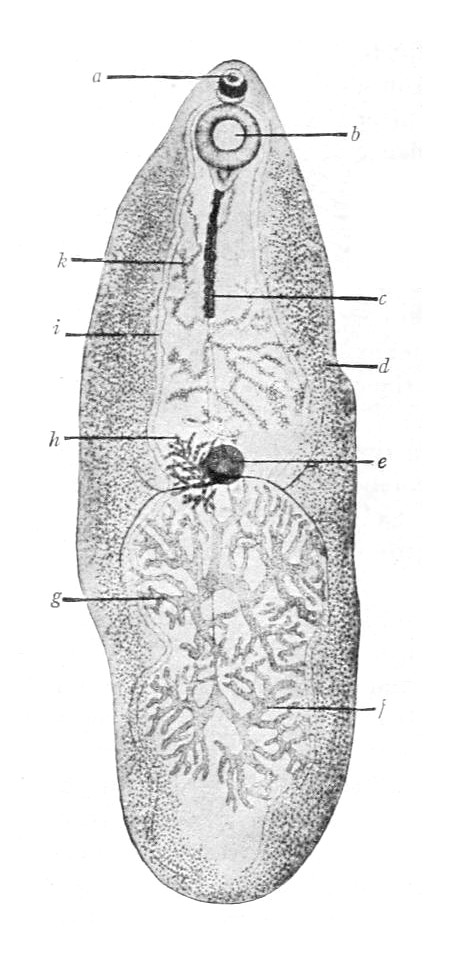
General anatomy

Fasciolopsis buski is commonly called the giant intestinal fluke, because it is an exceptionally large parasitic fluke, and the largest known to parasitise humans. Its size is variable and a mature specimen might be as little as 2 cm long, but the body may grow to a length of 7.5 cm and a width of 2.5 cm. It is a common parasite of humans and pigs and is most prevalent in Southern and Southeastern Asia. It is a member of the family Fasciolidae in the order Plagiorchiida. The Echinostomida are members of the class Trematoda, the flukes. The fluke differs from most species that parasitise large mammals, in that they inhabit the gut rather than the liver as Fasciola species do. Fasciolopsis buski generally occupies the upper region of the small intestine, but in heavy infestations can also be found in the stomach and lower regions of the intestine. Fasciolopsis buski is the cause of the pathological condition fasciolopsiasis.

In London, George Busk first described Fasciolopsis buski in 1843 after finding it in the duodenum of a sailor. After years of careful study and self experimentation, in 1925, Claude Heman Barlow determined its life cycle in humans.

=== Morphology ===
Fasciolopsis buski is a large, dorsoventrally flattened fluke characterized by a blunt anterior end, undulating, unbranched ceca (sac-like cavities with single openings), tandem dendritic testes, branched ovaries, and ventral suckers to attach itself to the host. The acetabulum is larger than the oral sucker. The fluke has extensive vitelline follicles. It can be distinguished from other fasciolids by a lack of cephalic cone or "shoulders" and the unbranched ceca.

=== Life cycle ===
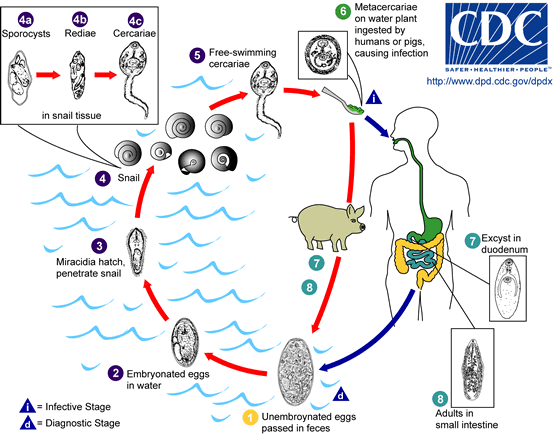

Adults produce over 25,000 eggs every day; these take up to seven weeks to mature and hatch at 27–32 °C. Immature, unembryonated eggs are discharged into the intestine and stool. In two weeks, eggs become embryonated in water, and after about seven weeks, tiny parasitic organisms called miracidia hatch from the eggs, which then go on to invade a suitable snail intermediate host. Several species in the genera Segmentina and Hippeutis serve as intermediate hosts. In the snail the parasite undergoes several developmental stages (sporocysts, rediae, and cercariae). The cercariae are released from the snail and encyst as metacercariae on aquatic plants such as water chestnut, water caltrop, lotus, bamboo, and other edible plants. The mammalian final host becomes infected by ingesting metacercariae on the aquatic plants. After ingestion, the metacercariae encyst in the duodenum in about three months and attach to the intestinal wall. There they develop into adults (20 to 75 mm by 8 to 20 mm) in approximately three months, remaining attached to the intestinal wall of the mammalian hosts (humans and pigs). The adults have a life span of about one year.

=== Pathogenesis ===
Humans become infected by ingesting metacercariae present on contaminated aquatic plants, like water chestnuts and watercress, or by consuming water contaminated with the parasite. Once ingested, the metacercariae encyst in the duodenum and attach to the jejunum and ileum of the intestinal wall. The flukes then use their oral sucker to stick to the intestinal mucosa, which can cause mechanical damage and irritation to the lining of the intestine. This attachment can lead to ulcerations, inflammation, and local tissue damage. The pathogenesis results in various symptoms, including:

- Abdominal pain
- Diarrhea
- Nausea
- Vomiting
- Fever
- Weight loss
- Allergic reactions due to the presence of the parasite

In severe cases or with prolonged infections, there can be nutritional deficiencies due to malabsorption caused by the intestinal damage. In other cases, secondary bacterial infections might occur due to the disruption of the intestinal barrier by the fluke, leading to further opportunistic infections. Adult flukes reside in the small intestine, where they mature and produce eggs. These eggs are then passed into the host's feces where they will continue the life cycle of the parasite. Treatment involves anthelmintic medications to rid the flukes from the intestines. Early diagnosis and treatment are essential in preventing further complications an progression of the disease.

=== Diagnosis ===
Examination of stool samples microscopically to identify parasite eggs can aid in the diagnosis of this parasite. However, due to intermittent egg shedding, multiple stool samples may be necessary for an accurate diagnosis. The WHO recommends the Kato–Katz technique as the method of choice for fascioliasis diagnosis attending to its ease of use and reproducibility, and its enhanced sensitivity compared with the observation of eggs in fresh faeces. Enzyme-linked immunosorbent assay (ELISA) or other serological tests can also help identify specific antibodies against Fasciolopsis buski antigens in the blood. In some cases, imaging techniques like ultrasound or endoscopy might also be used to visualize the flukes within the intestines.

=== Control ===
Promoting proper hygiene, clean water sources, and safe food practices to prevent contamination by infective stages of the parasite. Thoroughly cooking aquatic plants and ensuring proper washing and cleaning of vegetables and fruits to remove potential infective stages. Educating communities about the risks of consuming contaminated water, raw or undercooked plants, and promoting awareness of the disease can also play a huge role in containing the spread of this parasite. If contracted, another way to help control is the use of anthelmintic medications. Praziquantel is the type of medication currently used to treat such infections. These are to be prescribed by healthcare professionals for infected individuals to eradicate the parasites from the body.

=== Vaccination ===
Vaccination against trematode infections like fascioliasis and fasciolopsiasis is still an area of ongoing research. Development of effective vaccines for these parasites remains a challenge due to the complex life cycles and various stages of the parasites involved. Researchers continue to explore different approaches and antigens for potential vaccine candidates.

== Etymology ==
The genus Fasciolopsis was established by Arthur Looss in 1899 and the term derived from the Latin word fasciola, meaning small band, and the Ancient Greek suffix -ὄψῐς (-opsis), meaning resemblance, referring to the similarity with the members of the genus Fasciola. The species was named for the English surgeon George Busk, who identified the adult worm in 1852 from the duodenum of a sailor from India. The first comprehensive description of the species was provided by Edwin Lankester in 1857, and the parasite’s lifecycle was definitively clarified by Koan Nakagawa in 1921.
