= Fasciolosis =

Parasitic worm infection

- Other names: Fascioliasis, fasciolasis, distomatosis, liver rot
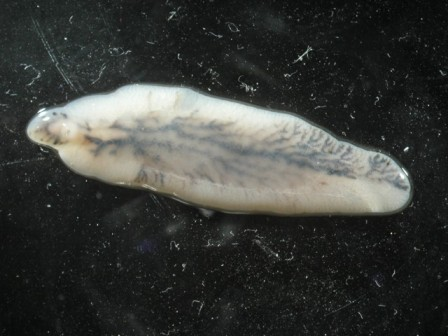
- Fasciola hepatica
- Specialty: Infectious disease, hepatology
- Symptoms: Abdominal pain, nausea, yellow skin
- Complications: Pancreatitis, anemia
- Causes: Fasciola flatworms
- Risk factors: Eating raw watercress
- Diagnostic method: Stool sample
- Prevention: Proper food preparation
- Medication: Triclabendazole
- Frequency: 2 millions

Fasciolosis is a parasitic worm infection caused by the common liver fluke Fasciola hepatica as well as by Fasciola gigantica. The disease is a plant-borne trematode zoonosis, and is classified as a neglected tropical disease (NTD). It affects humans, but its main host is ruminants such as cattle and sheep. The disease progresses through four distinct phases; an initial incubation phase of between a few days up to three months with little or no symptoms; an invasive or acute phase which may manifest with: fever, malaise, abdominal pain, gastrointestinal symptoms, urticaria, anemia, jaundice, and respiratory symptoms. The disease later progresses to a latent phase with fewer symptoms and ultimately into a chronic or obstructive phase months to years later. In the chronic state the disease causes inflammation of the bile ducts, gall bladder and may cause gall stones as well as fibrosis. While chronic inflammation is connected to increased cancer rates, it is unclear whether fasciolosis is associated with increased cancer risk.

Up to half of those infected display no symptoms, and diagnosis is difficult because the worm eggs are often missed in fecal examination. The methods of detection are through fecal examination, parasite-specific antibody detection, or radiological diagnosis, as well as laparotomy. In case of a suspected outbreak it may be useful to keep track of dietary history, which is also useful for the exclusion of differential diagnoses. Fecal examination is generally not helpful because the worm eggs can seldom be detected in the chronic phase of the infection. Eggs appear in the feces first between 9–11 weeks post-infection. The cause of this is unknown, and it is also difficult to distinguish between the different species of fasciola as well as distinguishing them from echinostomes and Fasciolopsis. Most immunodiagnostic tests detect infection with very high sensitivity, and as concentration drops after treatment, it is a very good diagnostic method. Clinically it is not possible to differentiate from other liver and bile diseases. Radiological methods can detect lesions in both acute and chronic infections, while laparotomy will detect lesions and also occasionally eggs and live worms.

Because of the size of the parasite, as adult F. hepatica: 20–30 × 13 mm (0.79–1.18 × 0.51 inches) or adult F. gigantica: 25–75 × 12 mm (0.98–2.95 × 0.47 inches), fasciolosis is a big concern. The amount of symptoms depends on how many worms and what stage the infection is in. The death rate is significant in both cattle (67.55%) and goats (24.61%), but generally low among humans. Treatment with triclabendazole has been highly effective against the adult worms as well as various developing stages. Praziquantel is not effective, and older drugs such as bithionol are moderately effective but also cause more side effects. Secondary bacterial infection causing cholangitis has also been a concern and can be treated with antibiotics, and toxaemia may be treated with prednisolone.

Humans are infected by eating watergrown plants, primarily wild-grown watercress in Europe or morning glory in Asia. Infection may also occur by drinking contaminated water with floating young fasciola or when using utensils washed with contaminated water. Cultivated plants do not spread the disease in the same capacity. Human infection is rare, even if the infection rate is high among animals. Especially high rates of human infection have been found in Bolivia, Peru, and Egypt, and this may be due to consumption of certain foods. No vaccine is available to protect people against Fasciola infection. Preventative measures are primarily treating and immunization of the livestock, which are required to host the live cycle of the worms. Veterinary vaccines are in development, and their use is being considered by several countries on account of the risk to human health and economic losses resulting from livestock infection. Other methods include using molluscicides to decrease the number of snails that act as vectors, but it is not practical. Educational methods to decrease consumption of wild watercress and other water plants have been shown to work in areas with a high disease burden.

Fascioliasis occurs in Europe, Africa, the Americas as well as Oceania. Recently, worldwide losses in animal productivity due to fasciolosis were conservatively estimated at over US$3.2 billion per annum. Fasciolosis is now recognized as an emerging human disease: the World Health Organization (WHO) has estimated that 2.4 million people are infected with Fasciola, and a further 180 million are at risk of infection.

== Signs and symptoms ==
=== Humans ===
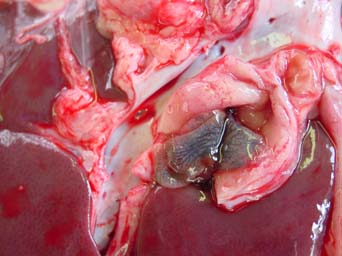
Adult flukes Fasciola hepatica in bile ducts (liver of goat)

The course of fasciolosis in humans has 4 main phases:

- Incubation phase: from the ingestion of metacercariae to the appearance of the first symptoms; period: few days to 3 months; depends on the number of ingested metacercariae and the immune status of the host
- Invasive or acute phase: fluke migration up to the bile ducts. This phase is due to the mechanical destruction of hepatic tissue and the peritoneum by migrating juvenile flukes, causing localized and or generalized toxic and allergic reactions. The major symptoms of this phase are:
  - Fever: usually the first symptom of the disease; 40–42 °C (104–108 °F)
  - Abdominal pain
  - Gastrointestinal disturbances: loss of appetite, flatulence, nausea, diarrhea
  - Hives
  - Respiratory symptoms (very rare): cough, shortness of breath, chest pain, coughing up blood
  - Enlargement of the liver and spleen
  - Fluid in the peritoneal abdominal cavity (ascites)
  - Low level of red blood cells in the bloodstream
  - Yellow discoloration of the skin or white parts of the eyes
- Latent phase: This phase can last for months or years. The proportion of asymptomatic subjects in this phase is unknown. They are often discovered during family screening after a patient is diagnosed.
- Chronic or obstructive phase:

This phase may develop months or years after the initial infection. Adult flukes in the bile ducts cause inflammation and epithelial hyperplasia. The resulting cholangitis and cholecystitis, combined with the large body of the flukes, are sufficient to cause mechanical obstruction of the biliary duct. In this phase, biliary colic, epigastric pain, fatty food intolerance, nausea, jaundice, itching, right upper quadrant abdominal tenderness, etc., are clinical manifestations indistinguishable from cholangitis, cholecystitis and cholelithiasis of other origins. Hepatic enlargement may be associated with an enlarged spleen or ascites. In case of obstruction, the gall bladder is usually enlarged and edematous with thickening of the wall. Fibrous adhesions of the gall bladder to adjacent organs are common. Lithiasis of the bile duct or gall bladder is frequent and the stones are usually small and multiple.

=== Other animals ===
Veterinary clinical signs of fasciolosis are always closely associated with infectious dose (amount of ingested metacercariae). In sheep, as the most common definitive host, the clinical presentation is divided into 4 types:

- Acute type I fasciolosis: infectious dose is more than 5000 ingested metacercariae. Sheep suddenly die without any previous clinical signs. Ascites, abdominal haemorrhage, icterus, pallor of membranes, weakness may be observed in sheep.
- Acute type II fasciolosis: infectious dose is 1000–5,000 ingested metacercariae. As above, sheep die but briefly show pallor, loss of condition, and ascites.
- Subacute fasciolosis: infectious dose is 800–1000 ingested metacercariae. Sheep are lethargic, anemic, and may die. Weight loss is a dominant feature.
- Chronic fasciolosis: infectious dose is 200–800 ingested metacercariae. The asymptomatic or gradual development of bottle jaw (accumulation of fluid in the submandibular tissue) and ascites (ventral edema), emaciation, and weight loss.

In blood, anemia, hypoalbuminemia, and eosinophilia may be observed in all types of fasciolosis. Elevation of liver enzyme activities, such as glutamate dehydrogenase (GLDH), gamma-glutamyl transferase (GGT), and lactate dehydrogenase (LDH), is detected in subacute or chronic fasciolosis from 12 to 15 weeks after ingestion of metacercariae. Economical effect of fasciolosis in sheep consists in sudden deaths of animals as well as in the reduction of weight gain and wool production. In goats and cattle, the clinical manifestation is similar to sheep. However, acquired resistance to F. hepatica infection is well-known in adult cattle. Calves are susceptible to disease but more than 1000 metacercariae are usually required to cause clinical fasciolosis. In this case, the disease is similar to sheep and is characterized by weight loss, anemia, hypoalbuminemia, and (after infection with 10,000 metacercariae) death. The Importance of cattle fasciolosis consists in economic losses caused by condemnation of livers at slaughter and production losses especially due to reduced weight gain.

In sheep and sometimes cattle, the damaged liver tissue may become infected by the Clostridium bacteria C. novyi type B. The bacteria will release toxins into the bloodstream resulting in what is known as black disease. There is no cure and death follows quickly. As C. novyi is common in the environment, black disease is found wherever populations of liver flukes and sheep overlap.

== Cause ==
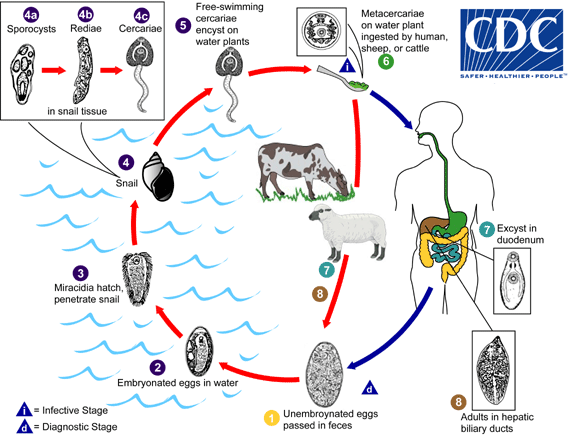
Immature eggs are discharged in the biliary ducts and in the stool: 1. Eggs become embryonated in water 2, and eggs release miracidia 3, which invade a suitable snail intermediate host 4, including the genera Galba, Fossaria, and Pseudosuccinea. In the snail, the parasites undergo several developmental stages (sporocysts The number 4a, rediae The number 4b, and cercariae The number 4c). The cercariae are released from the snail 5 and encyst as metacercariae on aquatic vegetation or other surfaces. Mammals acquire the infection by eating vegetation containing metacercariae. Humans can become infected by ingesting metacercariae-containing freshwater plants, especially watercress 6. After ingestion, the metacercariae excyst in the duodenum 7 and migrate through the intestinal wall, the peritoneal cavity, and the liver parenchyma into the biliary ducts, where they develop into adults 8. In humans, maturation from metacercariae into adult flukes takes approximately 3 to 4 months. The adult flukes (Fasciola hepatica: up to 30 mm by 13 mm; F. gigantica: up to 75 mm) reside in the large biliary ducts of the mammalian host. Fasciola hepatica infects various animal species, mostly herbivores.

Fasciolosis is caused by two digenetic trematodes F. hepatica and F. gigantica. Adult flukes of both species are localized in the bile ducts of the liver or gallbladder. F. hepatica measures 2 to 3 cm and has a cosmopolitan distribution. F. gigantica measures 4 to 10 cm in length and the distribution of the species is limited to the tropics and has been recorded in Africa, the Middle East, Eastern Europe, and South and Eastern Asia. In domestic livestock in Japan, diploid (2n = 20), triploid (3n = 30) and chimeric flukes (2n/3n) have been described, many of which reproduce parthenogenetically. As a result of this unclear classification, flukes in Japan are normally referred to as Fasciola spp. Recent reports based on mitochondrial genes analysis have shown that Japanese Fasciola spp. is more closely related to F. gigantica than to F. hepatica. In India, a species called F. jacksoni was described in elephants.

=== Transmission ===
Human F. hepatica infection is determined by the presence of the intermediate snail hosts, domestic herbivorous animals, climatic conditions, and the dietary habits of man. Sheep, goats and cattle are considered the predominant animal reservoirs. While other animals can be infected, they are usually not very important for human disease transmission. On the other hand, some authors have observed that donkeys and pigs contribute to disease transmission in Bolivia. Among wild animals, it has been demonstrated that the peridomestic rat (Rattus rattus) may play an important role in the spread as well as in the transmission of the parasite in Corsica. In France, nutria (Myocastor coypus) was confirmed as a wild reservoir host of F. hepatica. Humans are infected by ingestion of aquatic plants that contain the infectious cercariae. Several species of aquatic vegetables are known as a vehicle of human infection. In Europe, Nasturtium officinale (common watercress), Nasturtium sylvestre, Rorippa amphibia (wild watercress), Taraxacum dens leonis (dandelion leaves), Valerianella olitoria (lamb's lettuce), and Mentha viridis (spearmint) were reported as a source of human infections. In the Northern Bolivian Altiplano, some authors suggested that several aquatic plants such as bero-bero (watercress), algas (algae), kjosco and tortora could act as a source of infection for humans. Because F. hepatica cercariae also encyst on water surface, humans can be infected by drinking of fresh untreated water containing cercariae. In addition, an experimental study suggested that humans consuming raw liver dishes from fresh livers infected with juvenile flukes could become infected.

=== Intermediate hosts ===
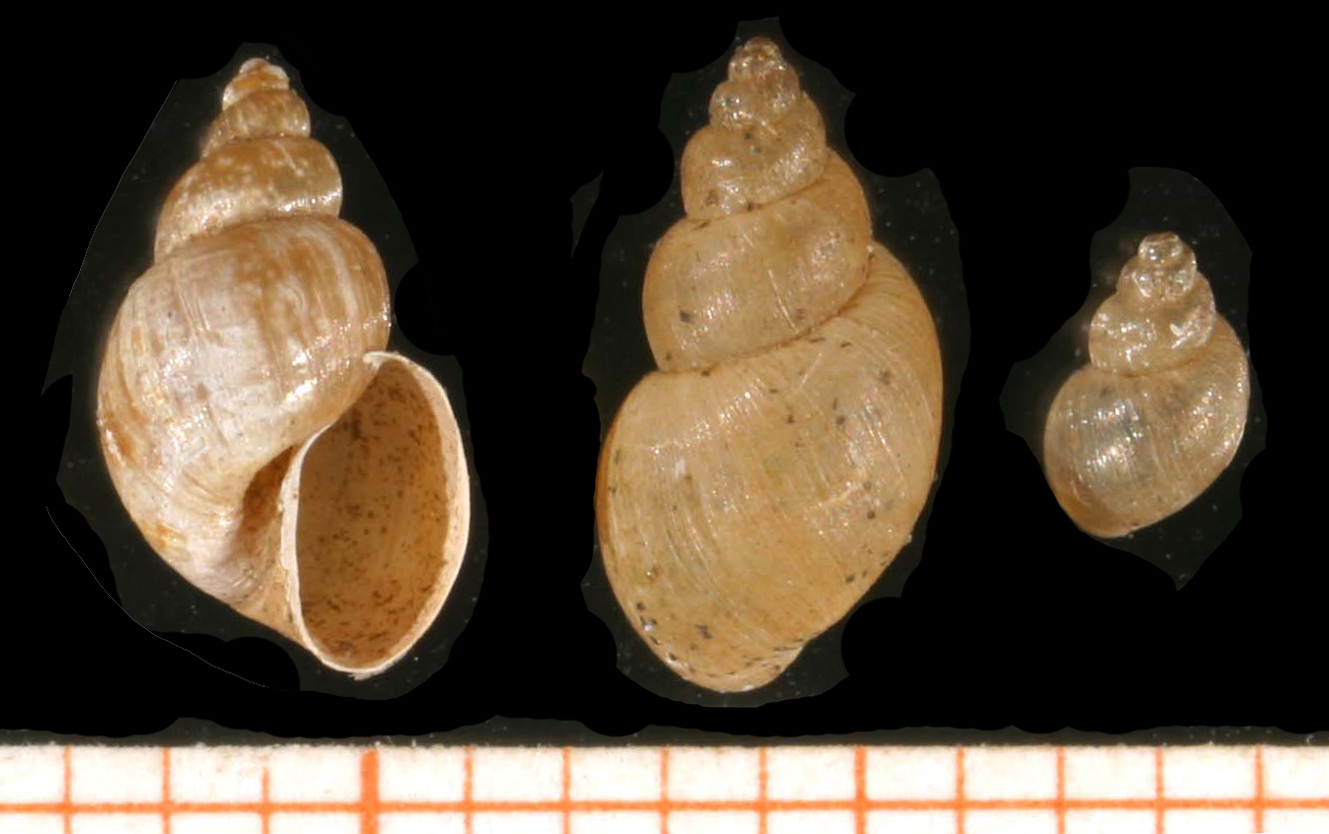
Galba truncatula - the most common intermediate host of F. hepatica in Europe and South America

Intermediate hosts of F. hepatica are freshwater snails from family Lymnaeidae. Snails from family Planorbidae act as an intermediate host of F. hepatica very occasionally.

== Mechanism ==
The development of infection in a definitive host is divided into two phases: the parenchymal (migratory) phase and the biliary phase. The parenchymal phase begins when excysted juvenile flukes penetrate the intestinal wall. After the penetration of the intestine, flukes migrate within the abdominal cavity and penetrate the liver or other organs. F. hepatica has a strong predilection for the tissues of the liver. Occasionally, ectopic locations of flukes such as the lungs, diaphragm, intestinal wall, kidneys, and subcutaneous tissue can occur. During the migration of flukes, tissues are mechanically destroyed and inflammation appears around migratory tracks of flukes. The second phase (the biliary phase) begins when parasites enter the biliary ducts of the liver. In biliary ducts, flukes mature, feed on blood, and produce eggs. Hypertrophy of biliary ducts associated with obstruction of the lumen occurs as a result of tissue damage.

=== Resistance to infection ===
Mechanisms of resistance have been studied by several authors in different animal species. These studies may help to better understand the immune response to F. hepatica in the host and are necessary for the development of a vaccine against the parasite. It has been established that cattle acquire resistance to challenge infection with F. hepatica and F. gigantica when they have been sensitized with primary patent or drug-abbreviated infection. Resistance to fasciolosis was also documented in rats. On the other hand, sheep and goats are not resistant to re-infection with F. hepatica. However, there is evidence that two sheep breeds, in particular Indonesian thin tail sheep and Red maasai sheep, are resistant to F. gigantica.

== Diagnosis ==
Most immunodiagnostic tests will detect infection and have a sensitivity above 90% during all stages of the disease. In addition, antibody concentration quickly drops post-treatment and no antibodies are present one year after treatment, which makes it a very good diagnostic method. In humans, diagnosis of fasciolosis is usually achieved parasitologically by findings the fluke eggs in stool, and immunologically by ELISA and Western blot. Coprological examinations of stool alone are generally not adequate because infected humans have important clinical presentations long before eggs are found in the stools.

Moreover, in many human infections, the fluke eggs are often not found in the faeces, even after multiple faecal examinations. Furthermore, eggs of F. hepatica, F. gigantica and Fasciolopsis buski are morphologically indistinguishable. Therefore, immunological methods such as ELISA and enzyme-linked immunoelectrotransfer blot, also called Western blot, are the most important methods in the diagnosis of F. hepatica infection. These immunological tests are based on the detection of species-specific antibodies from sera. The antigenic preparations used have been primarily derived from extracts of excretory/secretory products from adult worms, or with partially purified fractions. Recently, purified native and recombinant antigens have been used, e.g. recombinant F. hepatica cathepsin L-like protease.

Methods based on antigen detection (circulating in serum or faeces) are less frequent. In addition, biochemical and haematological examinations of human sera support the exact diagnosis (eosinophilia, elevation of liver enzymes). Ultrasonography and xray of the abdominal cavity, biopsy of the liver, and gallbladder punctuate can also be used (ref: US-guided gallbladder aspiration: a new diagnostic method for biliary fascioliasis. A. Kabaalioglu, A. Apaydin, T. Sindel, E. Lüleci. Eur. Radiol. 9, 880±882 (1999) . False fasciolosis (pseudofasciolosis) refers to the presence of eggs in the stool resulting not from an actual infection but from recent ingestion of infected livers containing eggs. This situation (with its potential for misdiagnosis) can be avoided by having the patient follow a liver-free diet several days before a repeat stool examination.

In animals, intravital diagnosis is based predominantly on faeces examinations and immunological methods. However, clinical signs, biochemical and haematological profile, season, climate conditions, epidemiology situation, and examinations of snails must be considered. Similarly to humans, faeces examinations are not reliable. Moreover, the fluke eggs are detectable in faeces 8–12 weeks post-infection. Despite that fact, faecal examination is still the only used diagnostic tool in some countries. While coprological diagnosis of fasciolosis is possible from 8- to 12 weeks post-infection (WPI), F. hepatica specific-antibodies are recognized using ELISA or Western blot after 2-4 weeks post-infection. Therefore, these methods provide early detection of the infection.

== Prevention ==
In some areas, special control programs are in place or have been planned. The types of control measures depend on the setting (such as epidemiologic, ecologic, and cultural factors). Strict control of the growth and sale of watercress and other edible water plants is important. Individual people can protect themselves by not eating raw watercress and other water plants, especially from endemic grazing areas. Travelers to areas with poor sanitation should avoid food and water that might be contaminated (tainted). Vegetables grown in fields, that might have been irrigated with polluted water, should be thoroughly cooked, as should viscera from potentially infected animals.

== Treatment ==
=== Humans ===
Several drugs are effective for fascioliasis, both in humans and in domestic animals. The drug of choice in the treatment of fasciolosis is triclabendazole, a member of the benzimidazole family of anthelmintics. The drug works by preventing the polymerization of the molecule tubulin into the cytoskeletal structures, microtubules. Resistance of F. hepatica to triclabendazole has been recorded in Australia in 1995 and Ireland in 1998.

Praziquantel treatment is ineffective. There are case reports of nitazoxanide being successfully used in human fasciolosis treatment in Mexico. There are also reports of bithionol being used successfully.

Nitazoxanide has been found effective in trials, but is currently not recommended.

== Epidemiology ==
Human and animal fasciolosis occurs worldwide. While animal fasciolosis is distributed in countries with high cattle and sheep production, human fasciolosis occurs, excepting Western Europe, in developing countries. Fasciolosis occurs only in areas where suitable conditions for intermediate hosts exist.

Studies carried out in recent years have shown human fasciolosis to be an important public health problem. Human fasciolosis has been reported by countries in Europe, America, Asia, Africa, and Oceania. The incidence of human cases has been increasing in 51 countries of the five continents. A global analysis shows that the expected correlation between animal and human fasciolosis only appears at a basic level. High prevalences in humans are not necessarily found in areas where fasciolosis is a great veterinary problem. For instance, in South America, hyperendemics and mesoendemics are found in Bolivia and Peru where the veterinary problem is less important, while in countries such as Uruguay, Argentina, and Chile, human fasciolosis is only sporadic or hypoendemic.

=== Europe ===
In Europe, human fasciolosis occurs mainly in France, Spain, Portugal, and the former USSR. France is considered an important human endemic area. A total of 5863 cases of human fasciolosis were recorded from nine French hospitals from 1970 to 1982. Concerning the former Soviet Union, almost all reported cases were from the Tajik Republic. Several papers referred to human fasciolosis in Turkey. Recently, serological survey of human fasciolosis was performed in some parts of Turkey. The prevalence of the disease was serologically found to be 3.01% in Antalya Province, and between 0.9 and 6.1% in Isparta Province, Mediterranean region of Turkey. In other European countries, fasciolosis is rare and sporadic, such as in Austria.

=== Americas ===
In North America, the disease is very sporadic. In Mexico, 53 cases have been reported. In Central America, fasciolosis is a human health problem in the Caribbean islands, especially in the zones of Cuba. Pinar del Río Province and Villa Clara Province are Cuban regions where fasciolosis was hyperendemic. In South America, human fasciolosis is a serious problem in Bolivia, Peru, and Ecuador. These Andean countries are considered to be the areas with the highest prevalence of human fasciolosis in the world. Well-known human hyperendemic areas are localized predominately in the high plain called altiplano. In the Northern Bolivian Altiplano, prevalences detected in some communities were up to 72% and 100% in coprological and serological surveys, respectively. In Peru, F. hepatica in humans occurs throughout the country. The highest prevalences were reported in Arequipa, Mantaro Valley, Cajamarca Valley, and Puno Region. In other South American countries like Argentina, Uruguay, Brazil, Venezuela and Colombia, human fasciolosis appear to be sporadic, despite the high prevalences of fasciolosis in cattle.

=== Africa ===
In Africa, human cases of fasciolosis, except in northern parts, have not been frequently reported. The highest prevalence was recorded in Egypt where the disease is distributed in communities living in the Nile Delta.

=== Asia ===
In Asia, the most human cases were reported in Iran, especially in Gīlān Province, on the Caspian Sea. It was mentioned that more than 10,000 human cases were detected in Iran. In eastern Asia, human fasciolosis appears to be sporadic. Few cases were documented in Japan, Koreas, Vietnam, and Thailand.

=== Australia and the Oceania ===
In Australia, human fasciolosis is very rare (only 12 cases documented). In New Zealand, F. hepatica has never been detected in humans.

== Other animals ==
Formula of triclabendazole

Several drugs have been used to control fasciolosis in animals. Drugs differ in their efficacy, mode of action, price, and viability. Fasciolicides (drugs against Fasciola spp.) fall into five main chemical groups:

- Halogenated phenols: bithionol (Bitin), hexachlorophene (Bilevon), nitroxynil (Trodax)
- Salicylanilides: closantel (Flukiver, Supaverm), rafoxanide (Flukanide, Ranizole)
- Benzimidazoles: triclabendazole (Fasinex), albendazole (Vermitan, Valbazen), mebendazol (Telmin), luxabendazole (Fluxacur)
- Sulphonamides: clorsulon (Ivomec Plus)
- Phenoxyalkanes: diamphenetide (Coriban)

Triclabendazole (Fasinex) is considered the most common drug due to its high efficacy against adult as well as juvenile flukes. Triclabendazole is used in the control of fasciolosis of livestock in many countries. Nevertheless, long-term veterinary use of triclabendazole has caused the appearance of resistance in F. hepatica. In animals, triclabendazole resistance was first described in Australia, later in Ireland and Scotland and more recently in the Netherlands. Considering this fact, scientists have started to work on the development of new drug. Recently, a new fasciolicide was successfully tested in naturally and experimentally infected cattle in Mexico. This new drug is called 'Compound Alpha' and is chemically very similar to triclabendazole. Countries where fasciolosis in livestock was repeatedly reported:

- Europe: UK, Ireland, France, Portugal, Spain, Switzerland, Italy, Netherlands, Germany, Poland
- Asia: Turkey, Russia, Thailand, Iraq, Iran, China, Vietnam, India, Nepal, Japan, Korea, Philippines
- Africa: Kenya, Zimbabwe, Nigeria, Egypt, Gambia, Morocco
- Australia and the Oceania: Australia, New Zealand
- Americas: United States, Mexico, Cuba, Peru, Chile, Uruguay, Argentina, Jamaica, Brazil

On September 8, 2007, Veterinary officials in South Cotabato, Philippines said that laboratory tests on samples from cows, carabaos, and horses in the province's 10 towns and lone city showed the level of infection at 89.5%, a sudden increase of positive cases among large livestock due to the erratic weather condition in the area. They must be treated forthwith to prevent complications with surra and hemorrhagic septicemia diseases. Surra already affected all barangays of the Surallah town.

== See also ==
- Fasciolopsiasis
- Clonorchiasis
- Fh8 - chemical produced by fasciolosis infection in the liver
