= Paramphistomidae =

Scientific classification
- Kingdom: Animalia
- Phylum: Platyhelminthes
- Class: Trematoda
- Order: Plagiorchiida
- Suborder: Pronocephalata
- Superfamily: Paramphistomoidea
- Family: Paramphistomidae; Fischoeder, 1901

Family of flukes

Paramphistomidae is a family of trematodes in the order Plagiorchiida.

== Classification ==
This family contains two subfamilies consisting of 17 genera.

- Paramphistominae
  - Calicophoron
  - Cotylophoron
  - Explanatum
  - Gigantocotyle
  - Paramphistomum
  - Ugandocotyle
- Orthocoeliinae
  - Bilatorchis
  - Buxifrons
  - Gigantoatrium
  - Glyptamphistoma
  - Leiperocotyle
  - Nilocotyle
  - Orthocoelium
  - Platyamphistoma
  - Sellsitrema
- Genus of unknown rank
  - Macropharynx
