= Cercaria =

Larval form of parasite

A cercaria (plural cercariae) is a larval form of the trematode class of parasites. It develops within the germinal cells of the sporocyst or redia. A cercaria has a tapering head with large penetration glands. It may or may not have a long swimming "tail", depending on the species. The motile cercaria finds and settles in a host where it will become either an adult, or a mesocercaria, or a metacercaria, according to species.

Cercarial infection in water environments by non-human schistosome species causes dermatologic burden to nearby swimmers, fishermen and farmers. The cycle as mentioned above, starts with egg distribution whether fecal in route or from the nostril of a duck or goose. Miracidia infect snail reservoirs and form successive sporocysts. Released cercariae travel and infect nearby non-human mammals or birds, depending on species, or accidental hosts such as humans. This dead-end infection and host allergic reaction has been referred to as cercarial dermatitis or "swimmer's itch". Dermatitis can also be seen following exposure to the cercariae of schistosome species that cause patent infections in humans (schistosomiasis) in endemic areas.

Among fish, infection beneath the scale bedding by cercariae of other trematode species can result in black spot disease. This is an example of an encysted form, or metacercaria. For some trematode species, cercarial encystment takes place on aquatic plants (e.g. in the liver fluke Fasciola gigantica and the intestinal fluke Fasciolopsis buski).

The term Cercaria is also used as a genus name in descriptions of species when only the larval form is known.

Rotifers (Rotaria rotatoria) produce a chemical, Schistosome Paralysis Factor, that suppresses cercaria swimming and reduces infections.
