= Paramphistomum cervi =

Scientific classification
- Kingdom: Animalia
- Phylum: Platyhelminthes
- Class: Trematoda
- Order: Plagiorchiida
- Family: Paramphistomidae
- Genus: Paramphistomum
- Species: P. cervi

Binomial name
- Paramphistomum cervi Zeder, 1790

Species of fluke

Paramphistomum cervi, the type species of Paramphistomum, is a parasitic flat worm belonging to the class Trematoda. It is a tiny fluke mostly parasitising livestock ruminants, as well as some wild mammals. Uniquely, unlike most parasites, the adult worms are relatively harmless, but it is the developing juveniles that cause serious disease called paramphistomiasis (or classically amphistomosis), especially in cattle and sheep. Its symptoms include profuse diarrhoea, anaemia, lethargy, and often result in death if untreated.

It can be found in many regions of the world, including Australia, Asia, Africa, Eastern Europe, and Russia. It is most commonly found in tropical and subtropical regions. The most debilitating cases are reported in Europe from Bulgaria, Italy, France, and Poland and also in Asia from Thailand, India, and China. The parasitic infection was first described from Punjab, India.

== Description ==
Adult P. cervi is conical in shape, the anterior end tapering and the posterior being broad, and pink in colour. The colour is due to its own haemoglobin. They are 5–13 mm long, 2–5 mm wide, with the ventral side somewhat concave while the dorsal side is convex. It has two suckers, an anterior oral sucker and a posterior larger ventral sucker, hence the generic name (Greek: para meaning "besides", amphi meaning "on both sides", and stoma for "mouth"). The tegumental surface is highly corrugated with transverse folds alternating with grooves and is spineless, which is uncharacteristic of trematodes. The genital pore is situated at the anterior third of the body. There are two types of bulbous shaped sensory papillae on the surface, each measuring 10–15 μ in diameter at the base with nipple-like tips; one has a short cilia on top. Clusters of papillae on the ventral surface and around the anterior suckers are larger in size and number; while there are few on the dorsal surface. As hermaphrodite, both male and female reproductive systems are present towards the posterior region of the body. Testes are slightly lobed and are located anterior to the ovary. Eggs are clear shell and measure about 140 x 80 μm; barrel-shaped with operculum at one end.

== Life cycle ==
The life cycle is indirect, involving a ruminant as definitive host, snail as intermediate host, and an interval of external phases in water and plants. The sexually mature monoecious adult self-fertilises in the mammalian rumen, and retains the eggs inside its uterus. Eggs are then released in the host intestine and are expelled along with faeces. Eggs are deposited in water and hatch at optimal temperature of 27 °C (81 °F) in 12–17 days to become ciliated miracidia. The non-feeding miracidia often swim through water searching for a suitable snail host, either until they reach the host or die. Most common intermediate hosts are snails belonging to the genera Bulinus, Planorbis, Physa, Stagnicola and Pseudosuccinea. When sensing the soft outer surface of a snail, they attach and burrow through the epidermis and into the tissue. Young snails are more susceptible to such penetration. In the snail tissue the miracidia lost their cilia within 12 hours and get transformed into sporocysts (~53 x 93 μm). By 11th day they develop up to 8 rediae, which are rapidly liberated. After 10 days the rediae mature and each contains 15–30 cercariae. The cercariae are released to grow further which may take about 13 days. Mature cercariae are characterised by two eyespots and a long slender tail. They are stimulated by light through the sensory eyespots in sunlight and leave the snail. They swim about in water until they find plants or other suitable substrata, to which they adhere and encyst to become metacercariae. The process of this cyst formation requires about 20 minutes only. Metacercariae are infective larvae but cannot resist desiccation, hence soon die out if suitable host is not found; but under constantly moist conditions, they can survive for up to 1 year and are capable of overwintering. The mammalian hosts harbour the infective larvae by ingestion. Once they reach the duodenum and jejunum, their cysts are cast off. Excystment is influenced by changing physicochemical conditions (such as temperature, substance concentration, and pH) inside the alimentary tract. Then they penetrate and feed on tissue of the gut wall of the small intestine. Once they develop sufficiently they migrate to the rumen, where the juveniles mature and produce ova. The period of rumen entry to egg laying takes about 60 to 120 days. However, the lifespan of an adult is unknown.

== Pathogenicity and pathology ==
Paramphistomiasis causes enteritis and anaemia in livestocks mammals and result in substantial production and economic losses. Adults attach to the villi in the rumens of the hosts and sap nutrients from the intestine, although they can wander into the bile and pancreatic ducts, as do other trematodes. Pathological symptoms are produced by immature flukes. When the young flukes start to gather in the intestine, there is a watery and fetid diarrhoea which is often associated with high mortality (even up to 80–90%) in ruminants. At a given time, as many as 30,000 flukes may accumulate, fervently attacking the duodenal mucosa to induce acute enteritis. Surprisingly, the adult flukes are regarded as commensals and non-pathogenic. However, they do cause the intestinal villi to erode and instil inflammation. Liver tissue are generally damaged extensively, indicated by swelling, haemorrhage, discolouration, necrosis, bile duct hyperplasia, and fibrosis. Paramphistomiasis is responsible for severe economic losses to milk, meat and wool production since the flukes take nutrients from their hosts, which leads to weight loss and physiological decline.

== Diagnosis and treatment ==
Symptoms are usually visible on the behaviour of the host. Infected sheep and cattle become severely anorexic or digest food inefficiently and become unthrifty. Continuous diarrhoea is an obvious indication of heavy infection in the digestive system, thus a primary diagnosis. The fluid faeces are examined to identify immature flukes.

Paramphistomiasis is considered a neglected tropical disease, with no prescription drug for treatment and control. Thus management of infection is based mainly on to reduce the host snail population. There are some treatment strategies demonstrated. A common regime is to drench with hexachloroethane-bentonite-water suspension, which is highly effective against adult parasites. Treatments with reported success (efficacies >90%) are resorantel, oxyclozanide, clorsulon, ivermectin and the combination of bithional and levamisole. Most important commercial anthelmintics are shown to be practically useless, including albendazole, praziquantel, nitroxynil, triclabendazole, profenophos and netobimin; while niclosamide has high efficacy (99%) against immature fluke but not adult fluke, and 2-tertiary-butyl benzthiazole compound (CGA 72630), hexachlorophene and resorantel are highly effective against both adult and immature flukes. An in vitro demonstration shows that plumbagin exhibits high efficacy on adult flukes.
