= Villi =

Villi may refer to:

- Plural of Villus (disambiguation)
- Le Villi, an opera-ballet of 1884 by Giacomo Puccini
- Ilkka Villi (born 1975), Finnish actor and writer
- Villi Bossi (born 1939), Italian sculptor
- Villi Hermann (born 1941), Swiss film director and screenwriter
- Villi Baltins (born 1942), Soviet sprint canoer
- Christian Villi (born 1974), Italian association football coach
- Olga Villi (1922–1989), Italian model and actress
- Villi Boskovsky (1909–1991), an Austrian violinist
- Villi Tokarev (1934–2019), a Russian-American singer-songwriter

== See also ==
- Vili (disambiguation)
