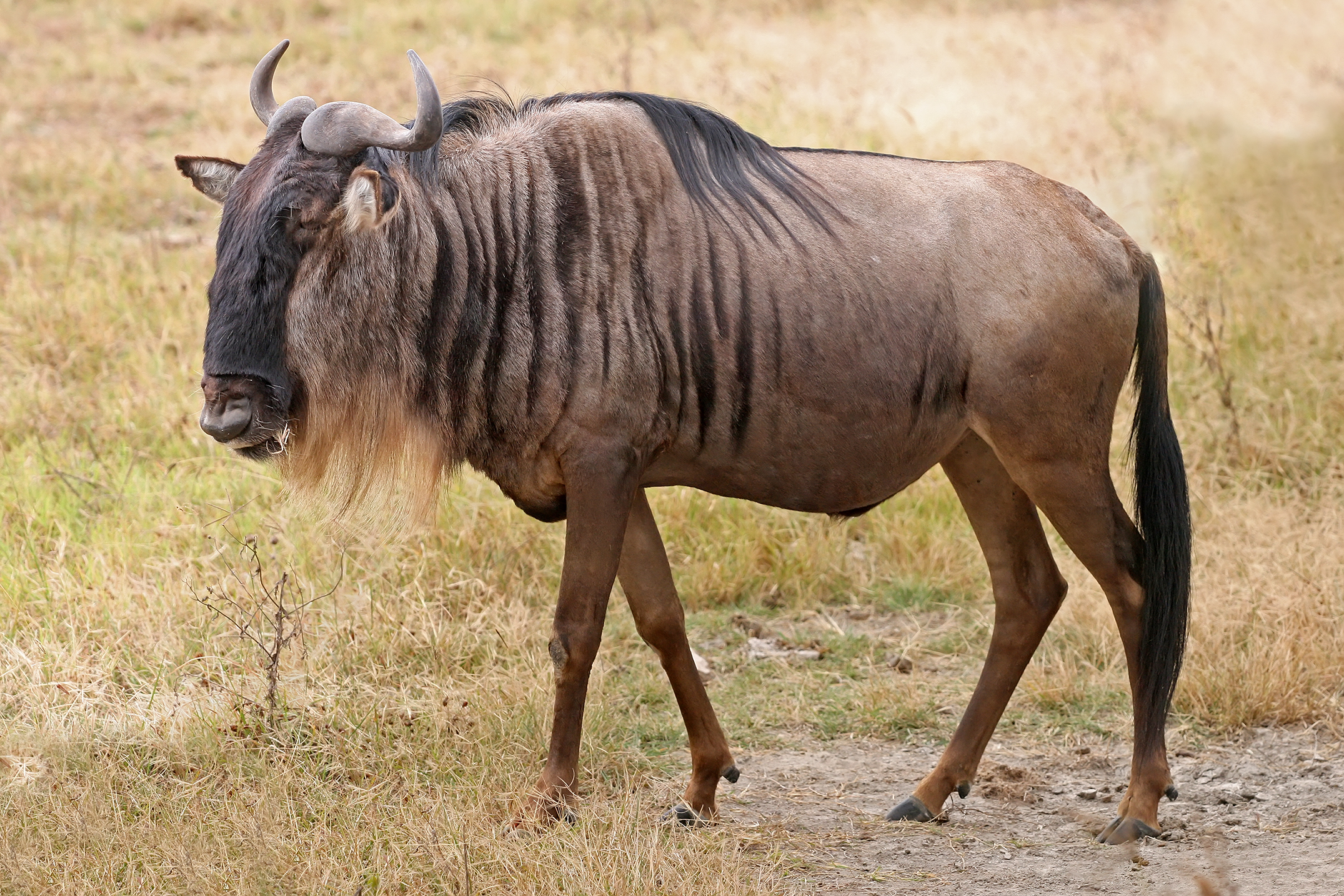
- C. t. albojubatus In the Ngorongoro Crater, Tanzania

Conservation status
- Least Concern (IUCN 3.1)

Scientific classification
- Kingdom: Animalia
- Phylum: Chordata
- Class: Mammalia
- Order: Artiodactyla
- Family: Bovidae
- Subfamily: Alcelaphinae
- Genus: Connochaetes
- Species: C. taurinus

Binomial name
- Connochaetes taurinus (Burchell, 1823)

Subspecies
- C. t. albojubatus (Thomas, 1912); C. t. cooksoni (Blaine, 1914); C. t. johnstoni (Sclater, 1896); C. t. mearnsi (Heller, 1913); C. t. taurinus (Burchell, 1823)
- Distribution of the subspecies: C. t. taurinus C. t. cooksoni C. t. johnstoni C. t. albojubatus C. t. mearnsi

= Blue wildebeest =

Blue wildebeest Temporal range: 1–0 Ma Middle Pleistocene – present

Species of antelope

The blue wildebeest (Connochaetes taurinus), also called the common wildebeest, white-bearded gnu or brindled gnu, is a large antelope and one of the two species of wildebeest. It is placed in the genus Connochaetes and family Bovidae, and has a close taxonomic relationship with the black wildebeest. The blue wildebeest is known to have five subspecies.

This broad-shouldered antelope has a muscular, front-heavy appearance, with a distinctive, robust muzzle. Young blue wildebeest are born tawny brown, and begin to take on their adult coloration at the age of 2 months. The adults' hues range from a deep slate or bluish-gray to light gray or even grayish-brown. Both sexes possess a pair of large curved horns.

The blue wildebeest is an herbivore, feeding primarily on short grasses. It forms herds which move about in loose aggregations, the animals being fast runners and extremely wary. The mating season begins at the end of the rainy season and a single calf is usually born after a gestational period of about 8.5 months. The calf remains with its mother for 8 months, after which it joins a juvenile herd.

Blue wildebeest are found in short-grass plains bordering bush-covered acacia savannas in southern and eastern Africa, thriving in areas that are neither too wet nor too arid. Three African populations of blue wildebeest take part in a long-distance migration, timed to coincide with the annual pattern of rainfall and grass growth on the short-grass plains where they can find the nutrient-rich forage necessary for lactation and calf growth.

The blue wildebeest is native to Angola, Botswana, Eswatini, Kenya, Mozambique, South Africa, Tanzania, Zambia, and Zimbabwe. Today, it is extinct in Malawi, but has been successfully reintroduced in Namibia. The southern limit of the blue wildebeest range is the Orange River, while the western limit is bounded by Lake Victoria and Mount Kenya. The blue wildebeest is widespread and is being introduced into private game farms, reserves, and conservancies. The International Union for Conservation of Nature and Natural Resources rates the blue wildebeest as being of least concern. The population has been estimated to be around 1.5 million, and the population trend is stable.

== Taxonomy and naming ==
The blue wildebeest was first described in 1823 by English naturalist William John Burchell, who gave it the scientific name Connochaetes taurinus. It shares the genus Connochaetes with the black wildebeest (C. gnou), and is placed in the family Bovidae, ruminant animals with cloven hooves. The generic name Connochaetes derives from the Greek words κόννος, kónnos, "beard", and χαίτη, khaítē, "flowing hair", "mane".

The specific name taurinus originates from the Greek word tauros, which means a bull or bullock. The common name "blue wildebeest" refers to the conspicuous, silvery-blue sheen of the coat, while the alternative name "gnu" originates from the name for these animals used by the Khoikhoi people, a native pastoralist people of southwestern Africa.

Though the blue and black wildebeest are currently classified in the same genus, the former was previously placed in a separate genus, Gorgon. In a study of the mitotic chromosomes and mtDNA, which was undertaken to understand more of the evolutionary relationships between the two species, the two were found to have a close phylogenetic relationship and had diverged about a million years ago.

Migration of western white-bearded wildebeest (C. t. mearnsi): Mara River crossing in Tanzania

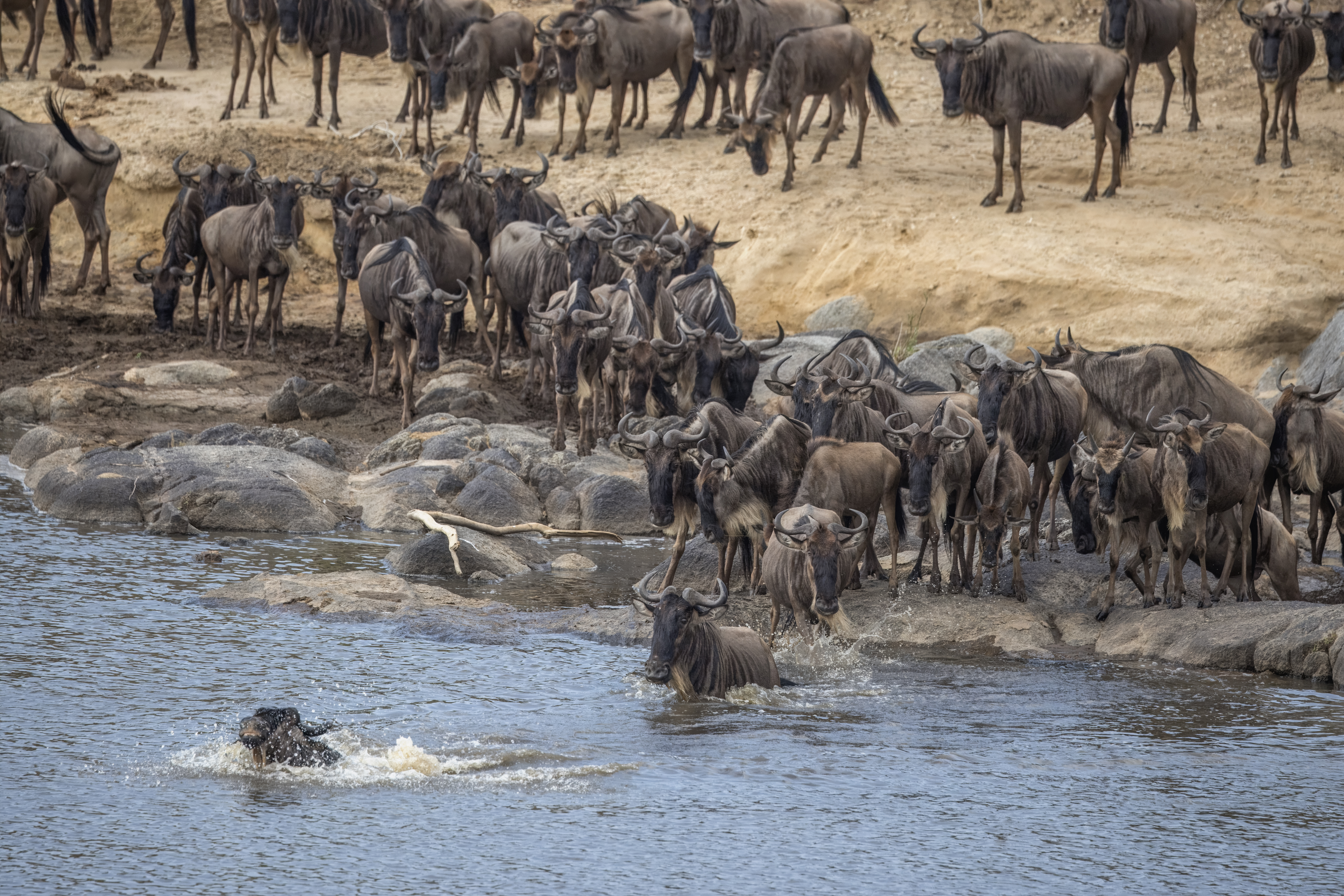
A wildebeest initiates the crossing.

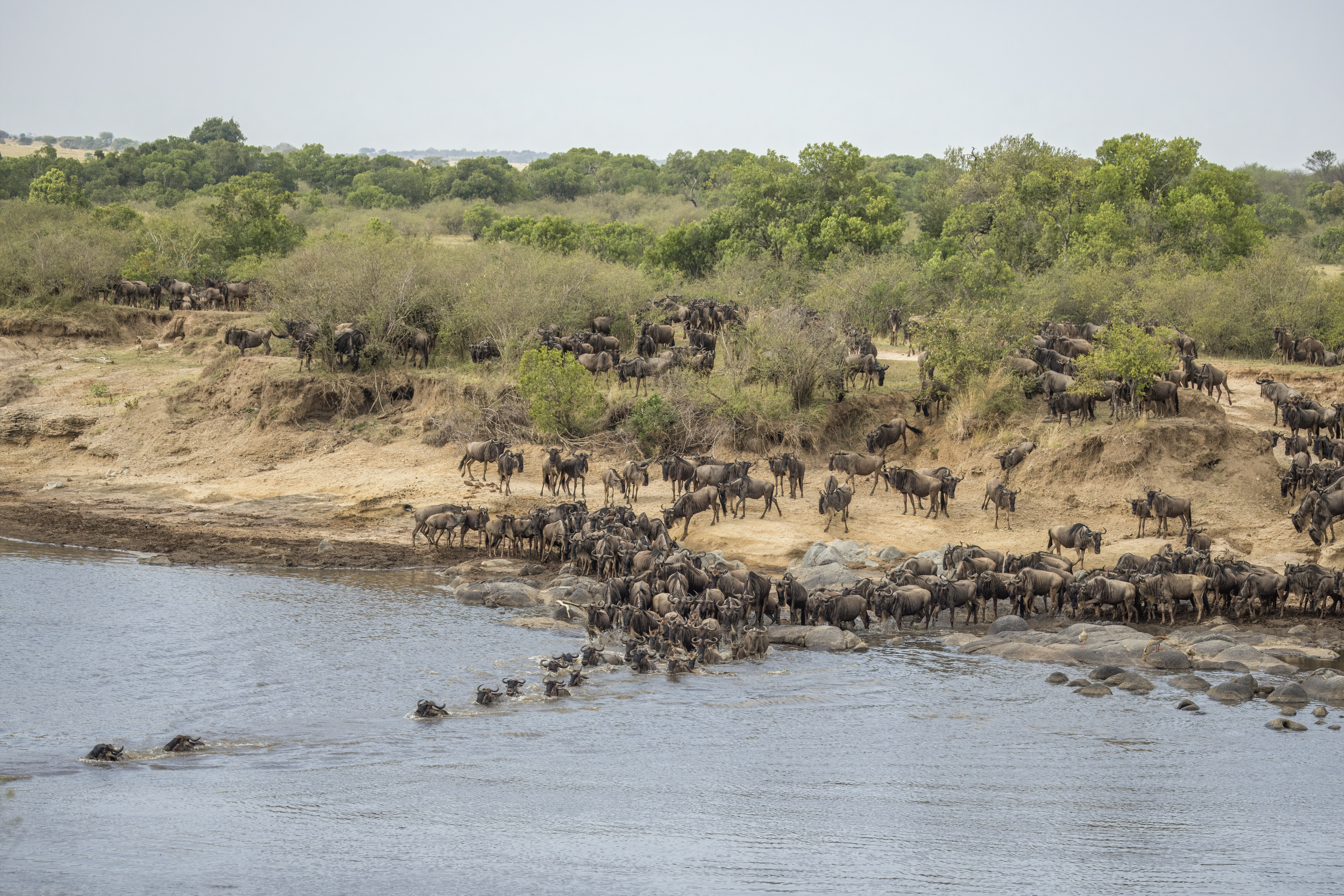
About 300 wildebeest follow the leader.

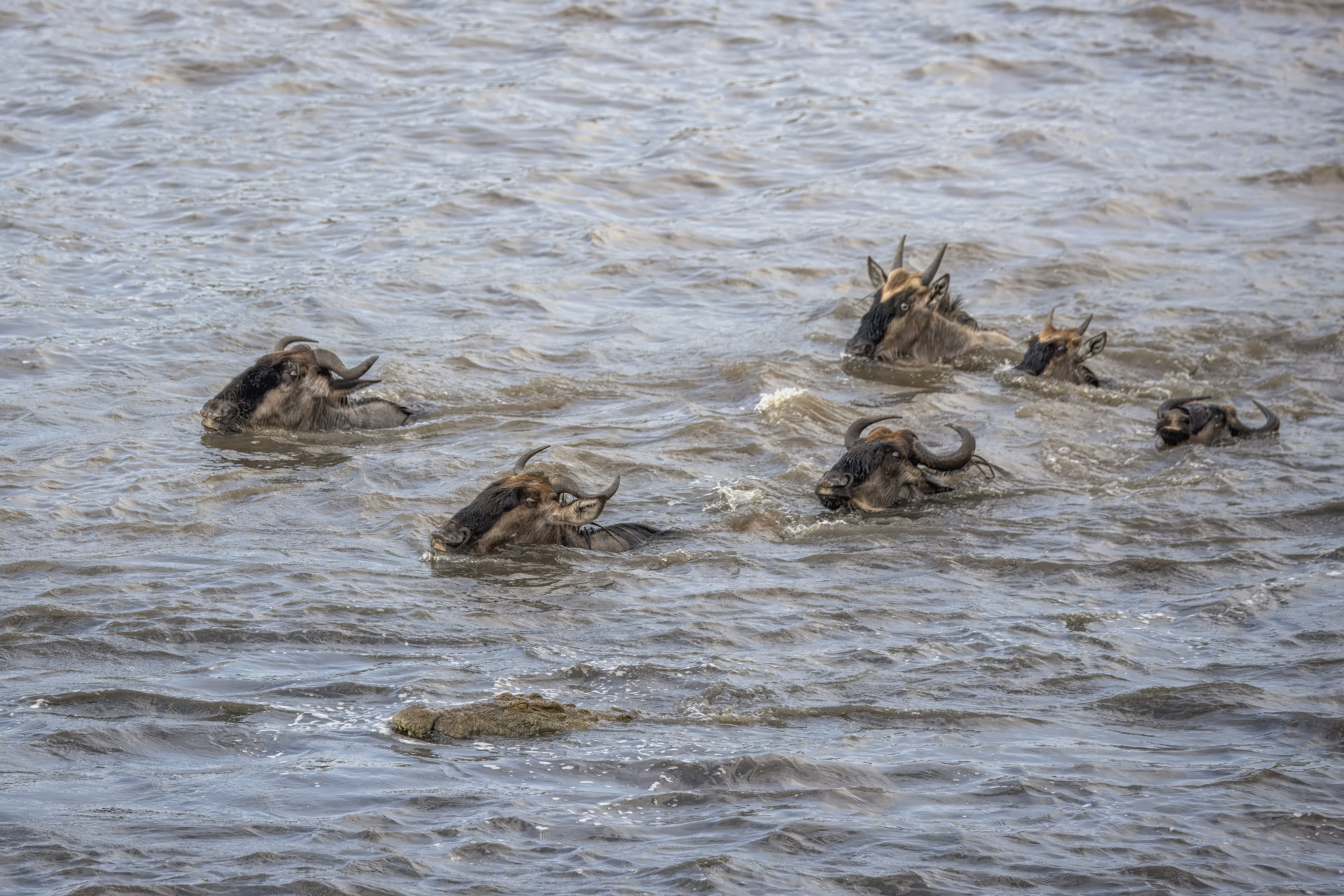
A crocodile approaches the swimming wildebeest.

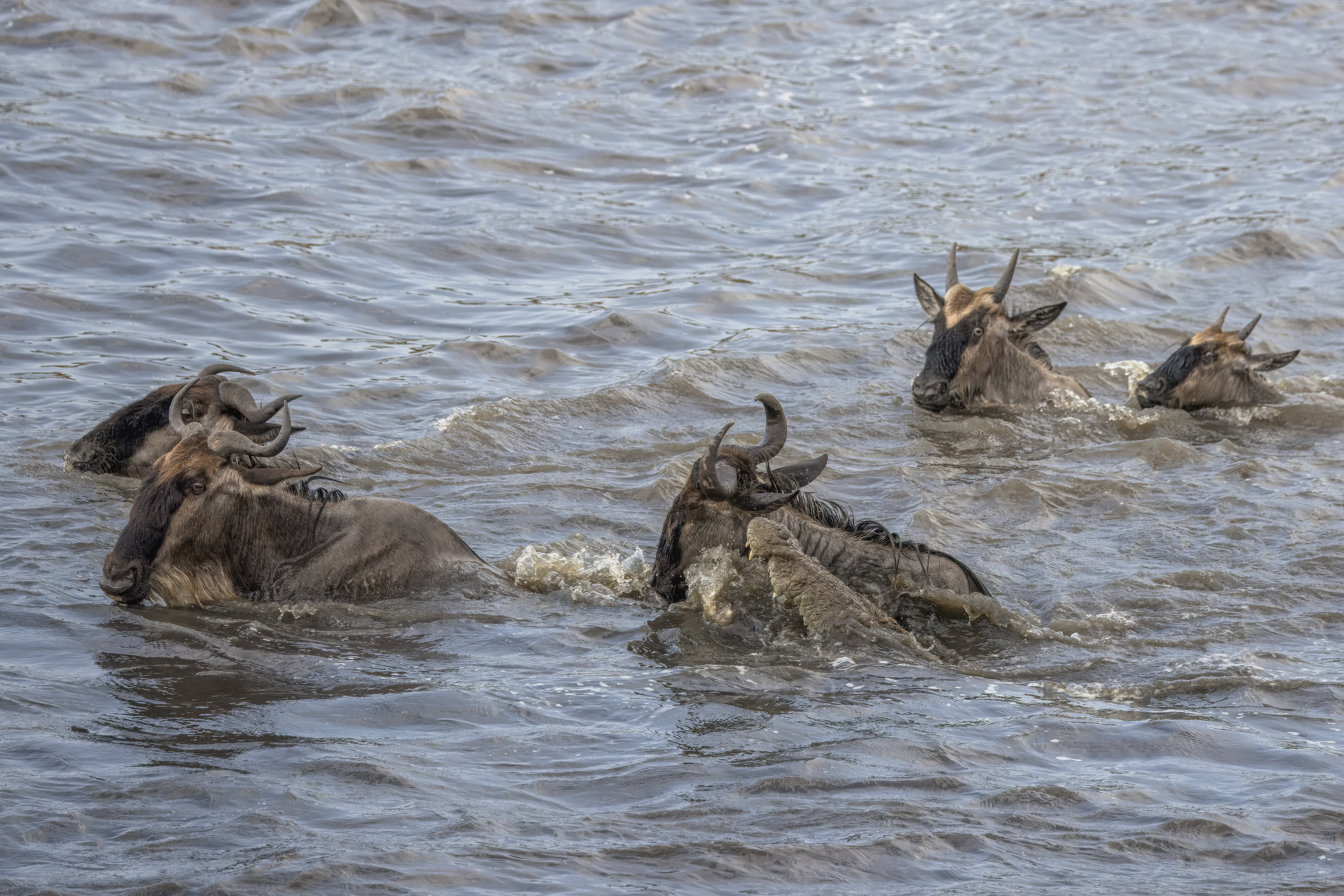
The crocodile attacks a swimming wildebeest.

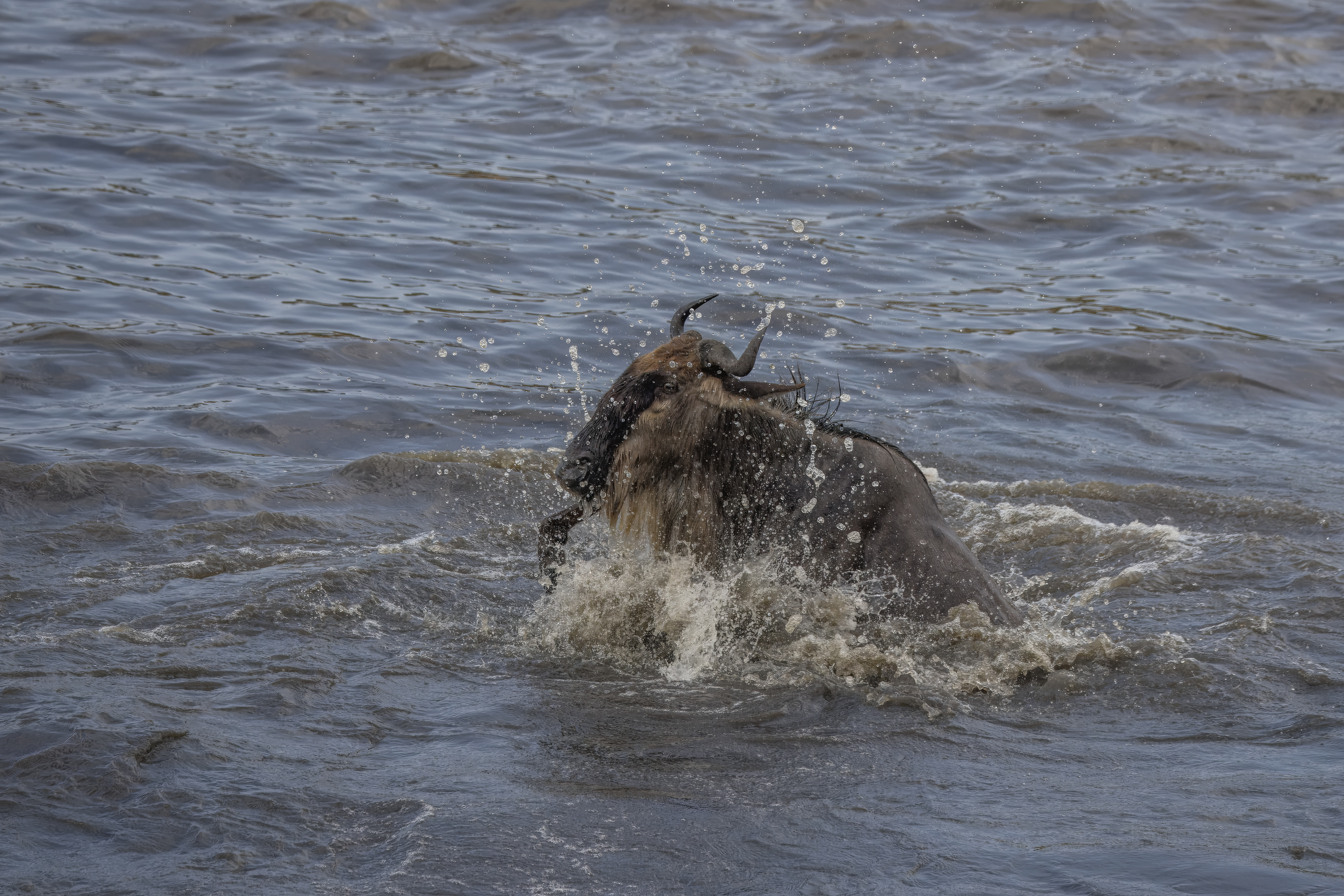
The wildebeest is dragged underwater by the crocodile.

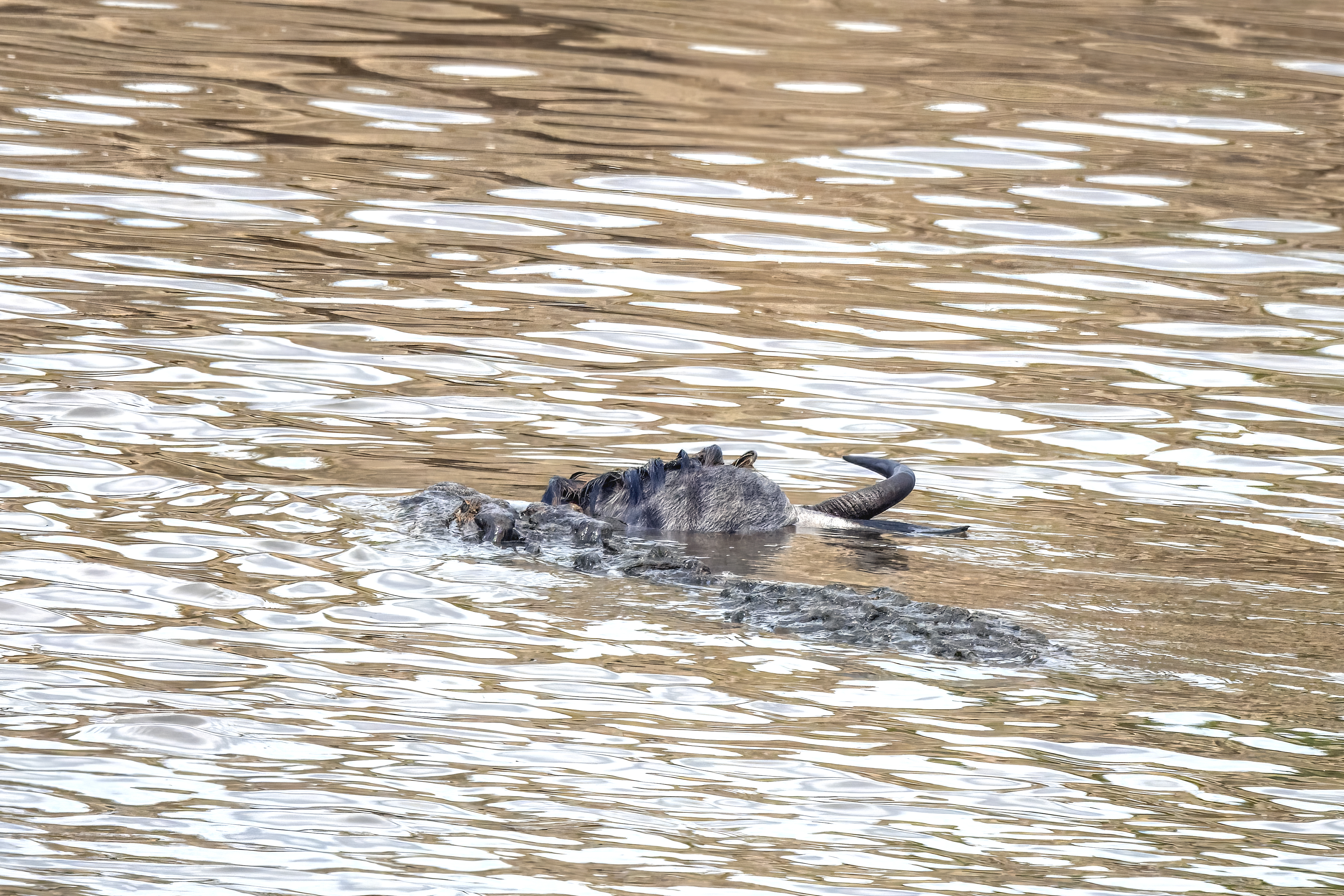
The crocodile surfaces after drowning the wildebeest.

A second crossing of the Mara River in the Serengeti National Park on the same day.

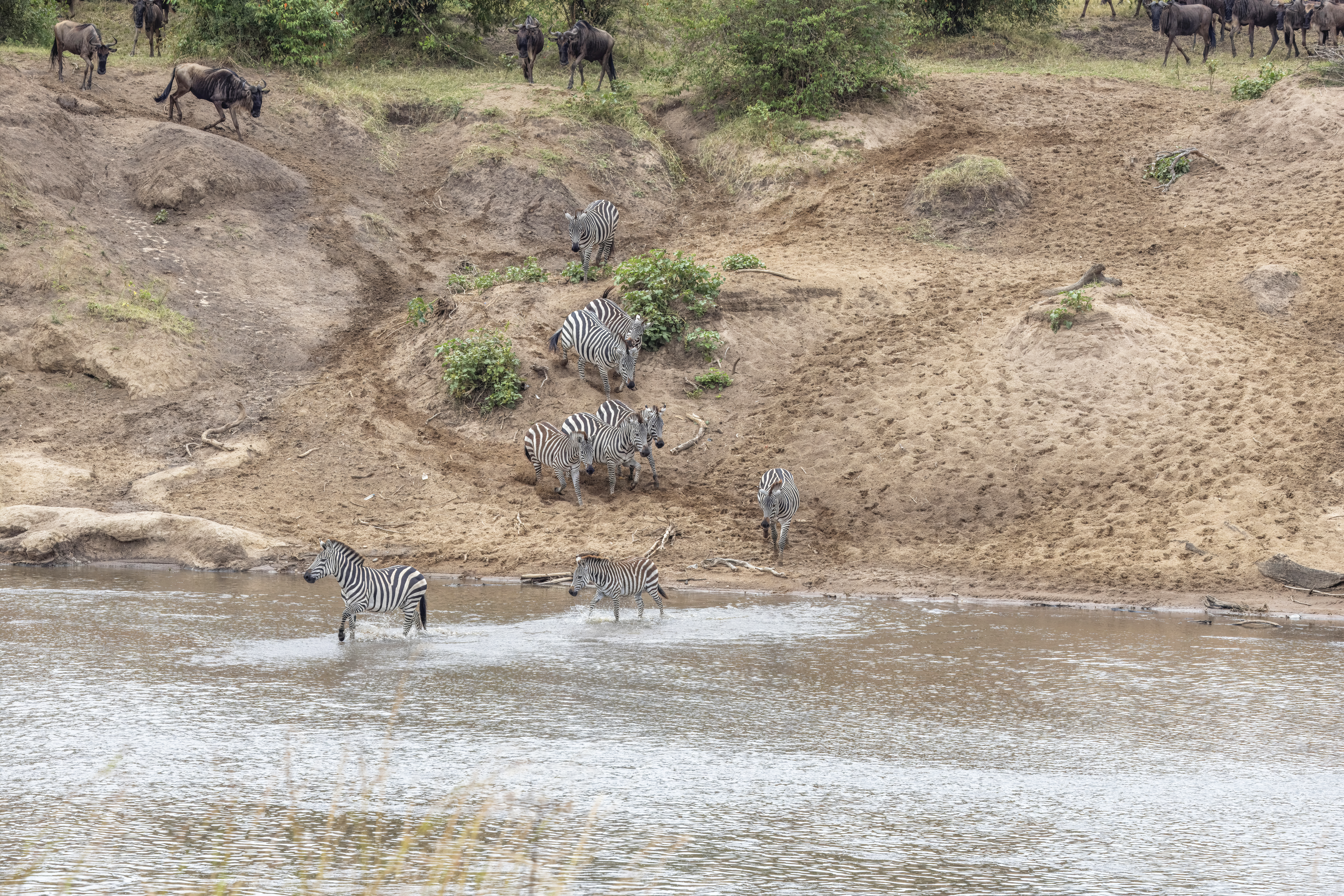
Zebras initiate the crossing.

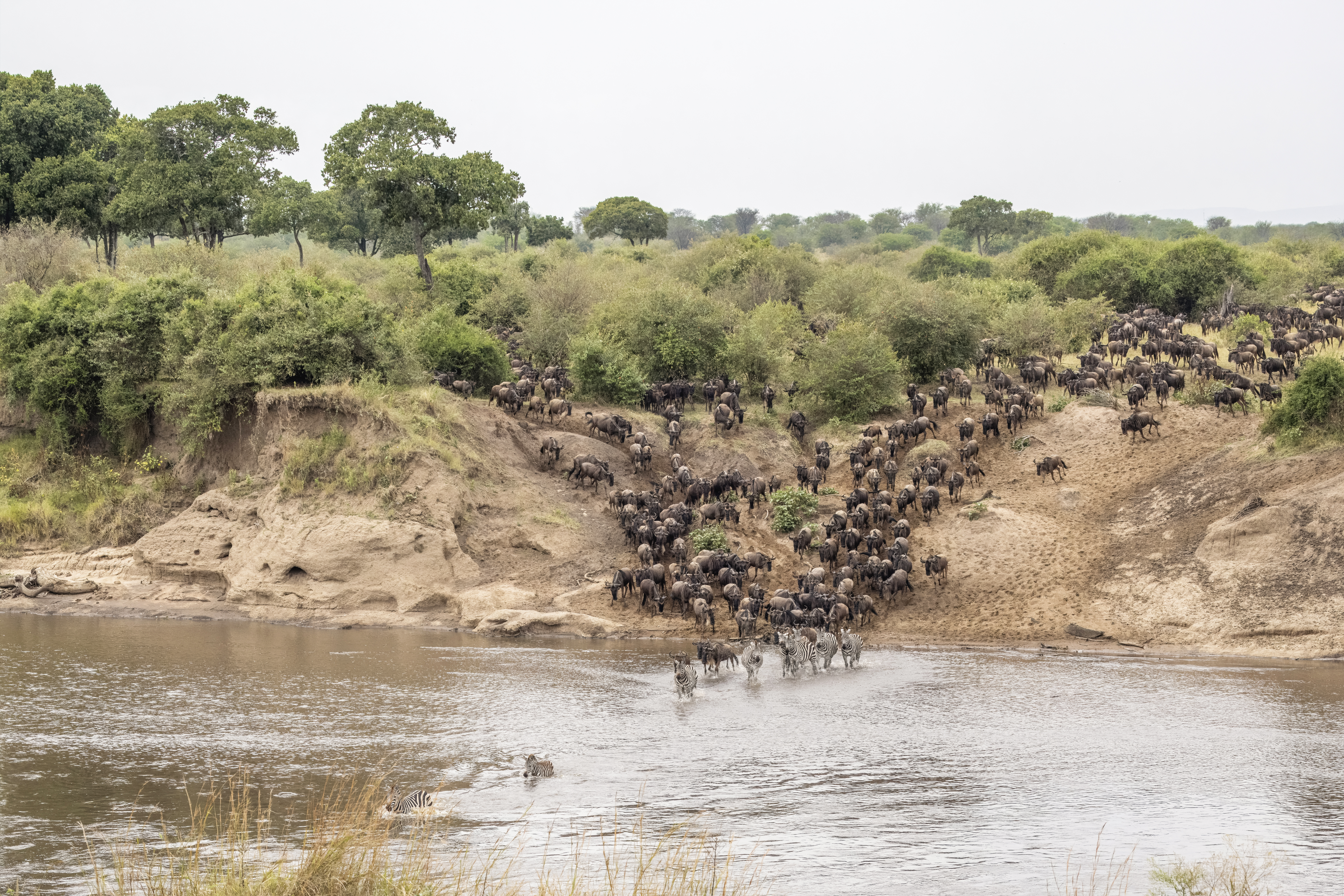
The wildebeest quickly follow the zebras into the river.

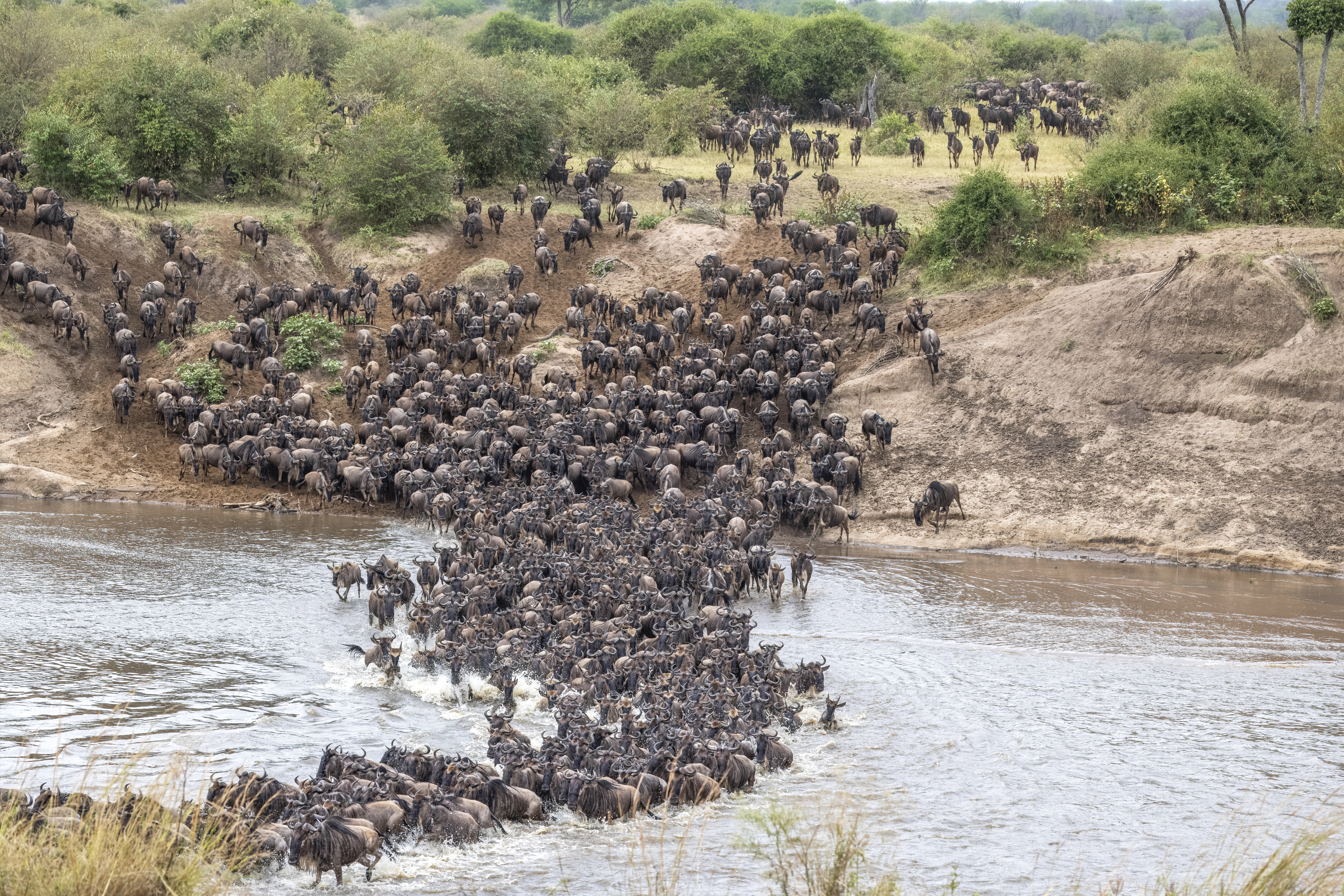
About 3000 wildebest make the crossing.

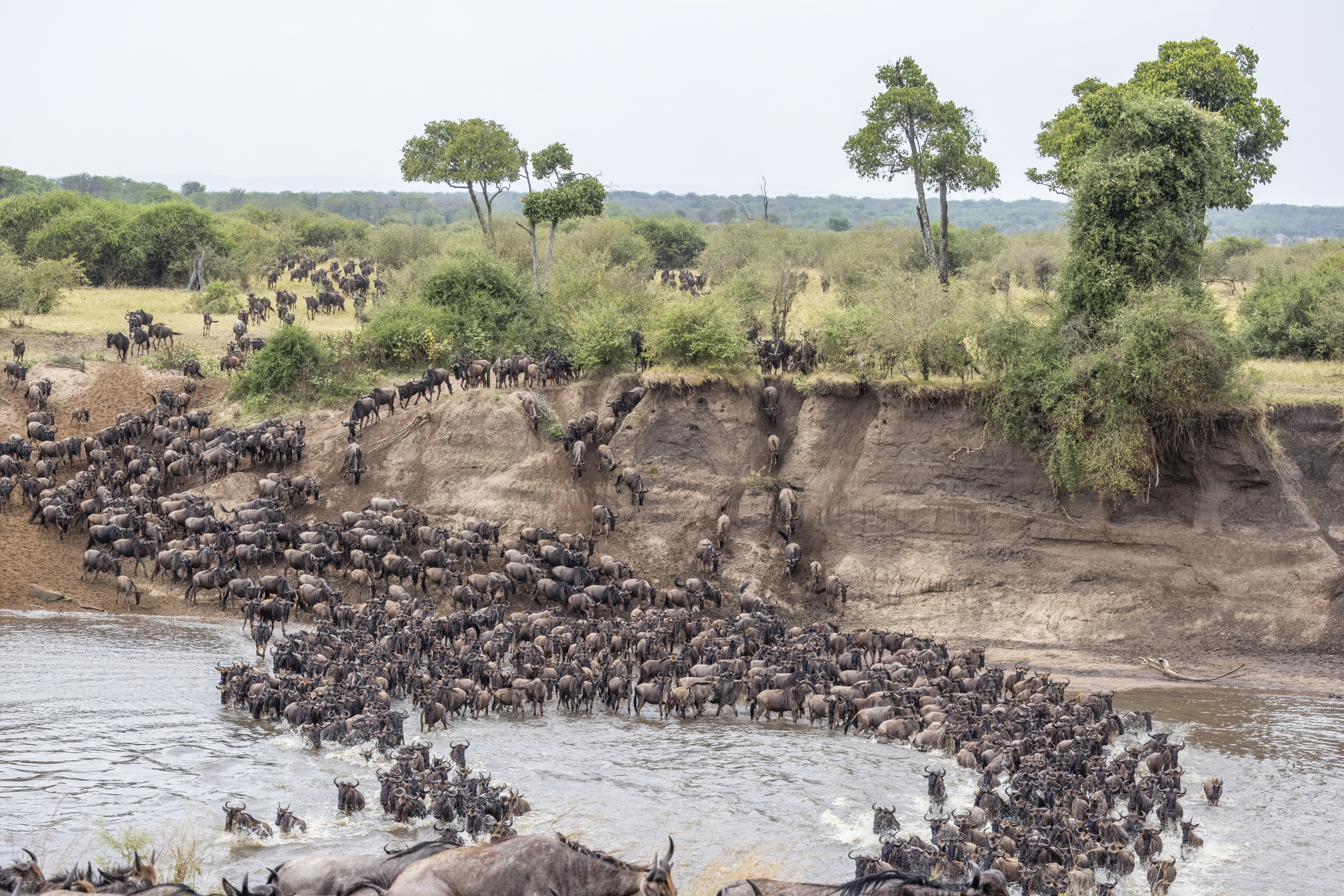
The herd splits into two groups and wildebeest start to descend the cliffs.

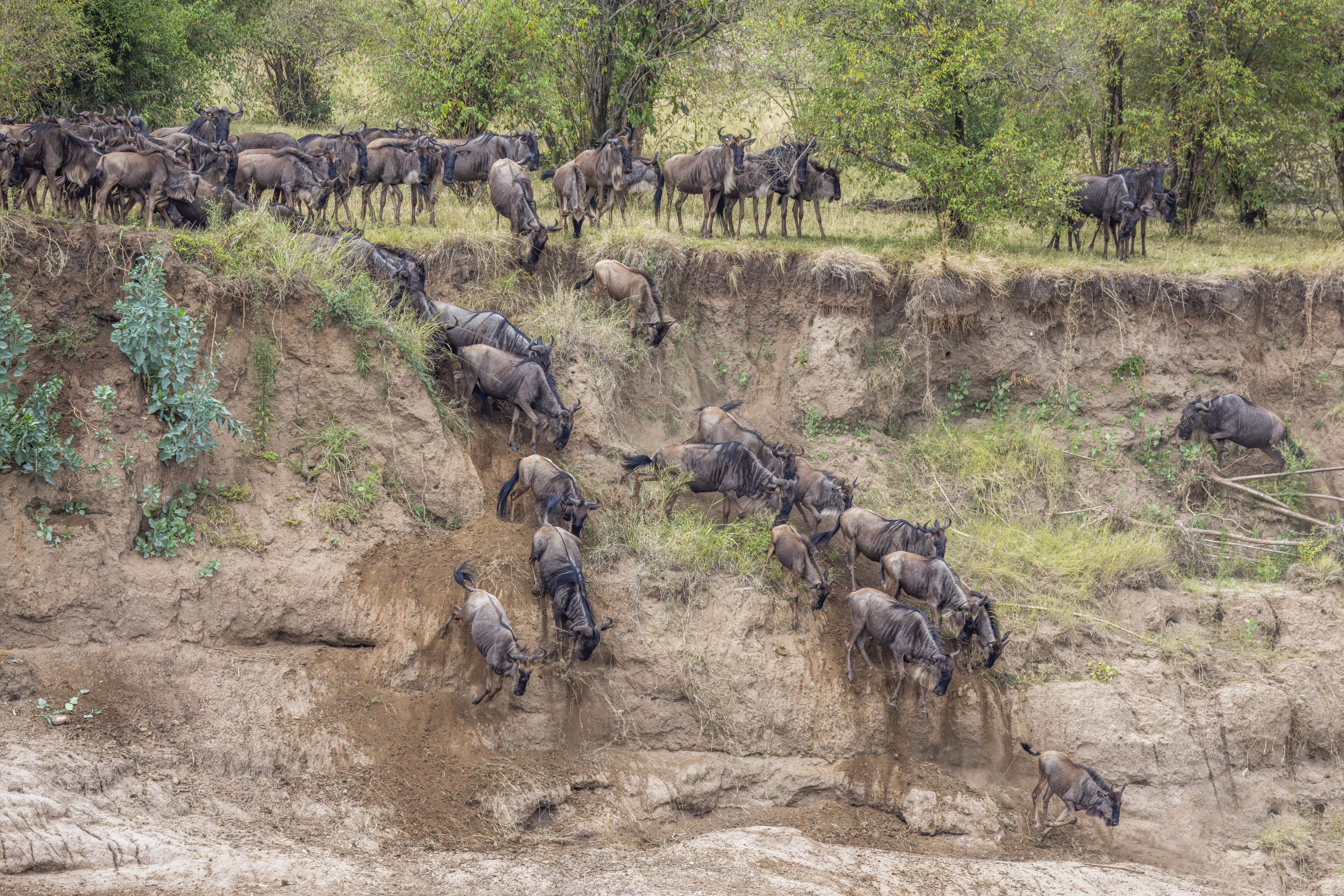
The wildebeest rush down the steep cliff to reach the water.

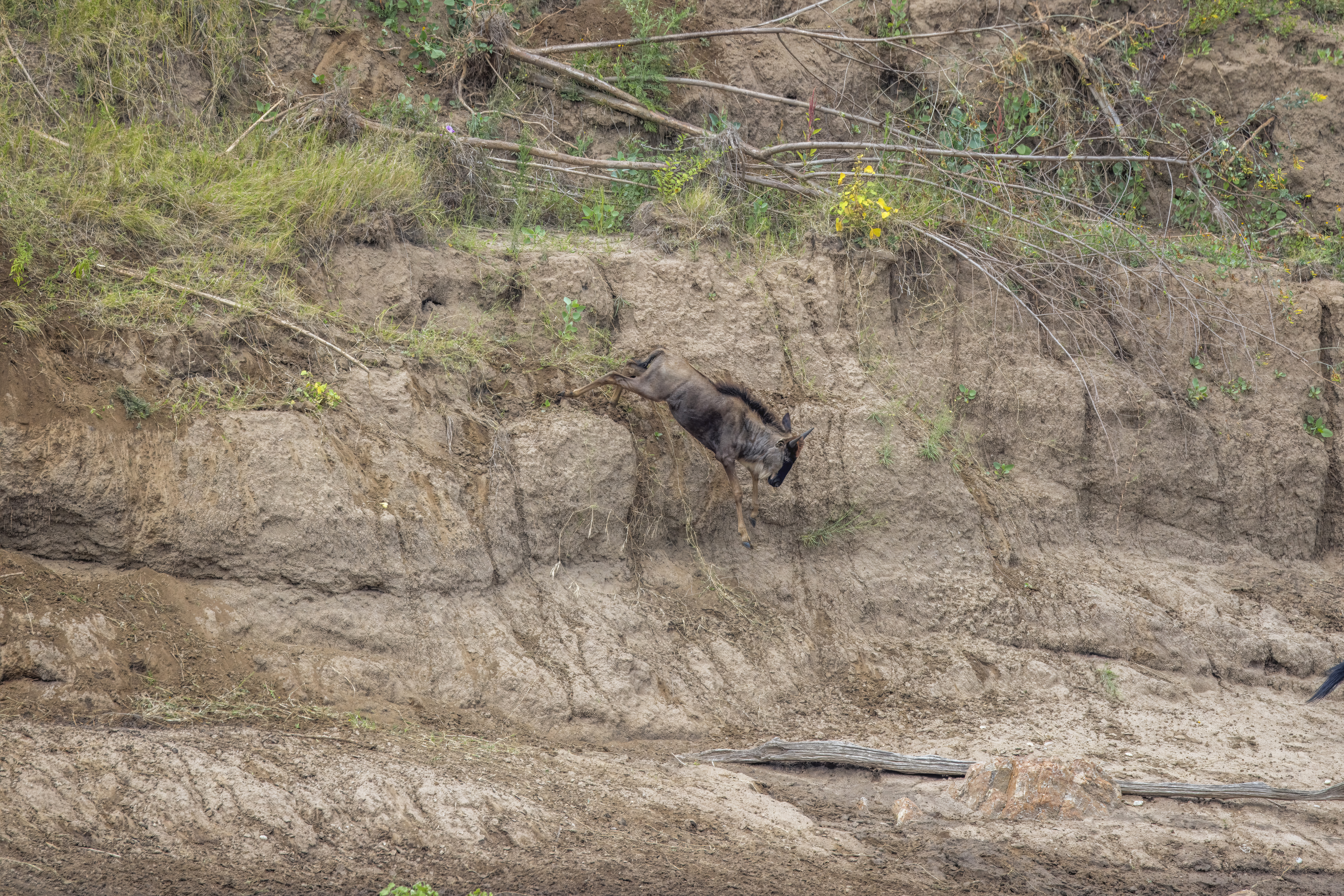
One of the last wildebeest jumps down the cliff.

=== Subspecies ===
C. taurinus has five subspecies:

- C. t. taurinus (Burchell, 1823) – the blue wildebeest, common wildebeest, or brindled gnu occurs in Southern Africa from Namibia and South Africa to north of the Orange River in Mozambique and south of the Zambezi River in southwestern Zambia to southern Angola.
- C. t. johnstoni (Sclater, 1896) – the Nyassaland wildebeest occurs from north of the Zambezi River to east-central Tanzania. It is now extinct in Malawi.
- C. t. albojubatus (Thomas, 1912) – the eastern white-bearded wildebeest occurs in the Gregory Rift Valley, and from northern Tanzania to central Kenya.
- C. t. mearnsi (Heller, 1913) – the western white-bearded wildebeest, occurs in northern Tanzania and southern Kenya. Its range extends from the west of the Gregory Rift Valley to Speke Bay on Lake Victoria.
- C. t. cooksoni (Blaine, 1914) – Cookson's wildebeest is restricted to the Luangwa Valley in Zambia and wanders sometimes into the plateau region of central Malawi.

In addition, the distinctive appearance of a western form, ranging from the Kalahari to central Zambia, suggests that subspecies mattosi (Blaine, 1825) may also prove distinct from subspecies taurinus.

=== Hybrids ===
The blue wildebeest is known to hybridise with the black wildebeest. The differences in social behaviour and habitats have historically prevented interspecific hybridisation, but it may occur when both species are confined within the same area, and the offspring are usually fertile. A study of these hybrid animals at Spioenkop Dam Nature Reserve in South Africa revealed that many had congenital abnormalities relating to their teeth, horns, and the Wormian bones of the skull. Another study reported an increase in the size of the hybrid as compared to either of its parents. In some hybrid animals, the auditory bullae are highly deformed, and in others, the radius and ulna are fused.

== Genetics and evolution ==
The diploid number of chromosomes in the blue wildebeest is 58. Chromosomes were studied in a male and a female wildebeest. In the female, all except a pair of very large submetacentric chromosomes were found to be acrocentric. Metaphases were studied in the male's chromosomes, and very large submetacentric chromosomes were found there as well, similar to those in the female both in size and morphology. The rest were acrocentric. The X chromosome is a large acrocentric, while the Y chromosome is a minute one.

This species of wildebeest seems to have evolved around 2.5 million years ago. The black wildebeest is believed to have diverged from the blue wildebeest to become a distinct species around 1 million years ago, in the Middle to Late Pleistocene. Fossil evidence suggests that blue wildebeest were quite common in the Cradle of Humankind in the past. Apart from eastern Africa, fossils are commonly found in Elandsfontein, Cornelia, and Florisbad.

== Description ==
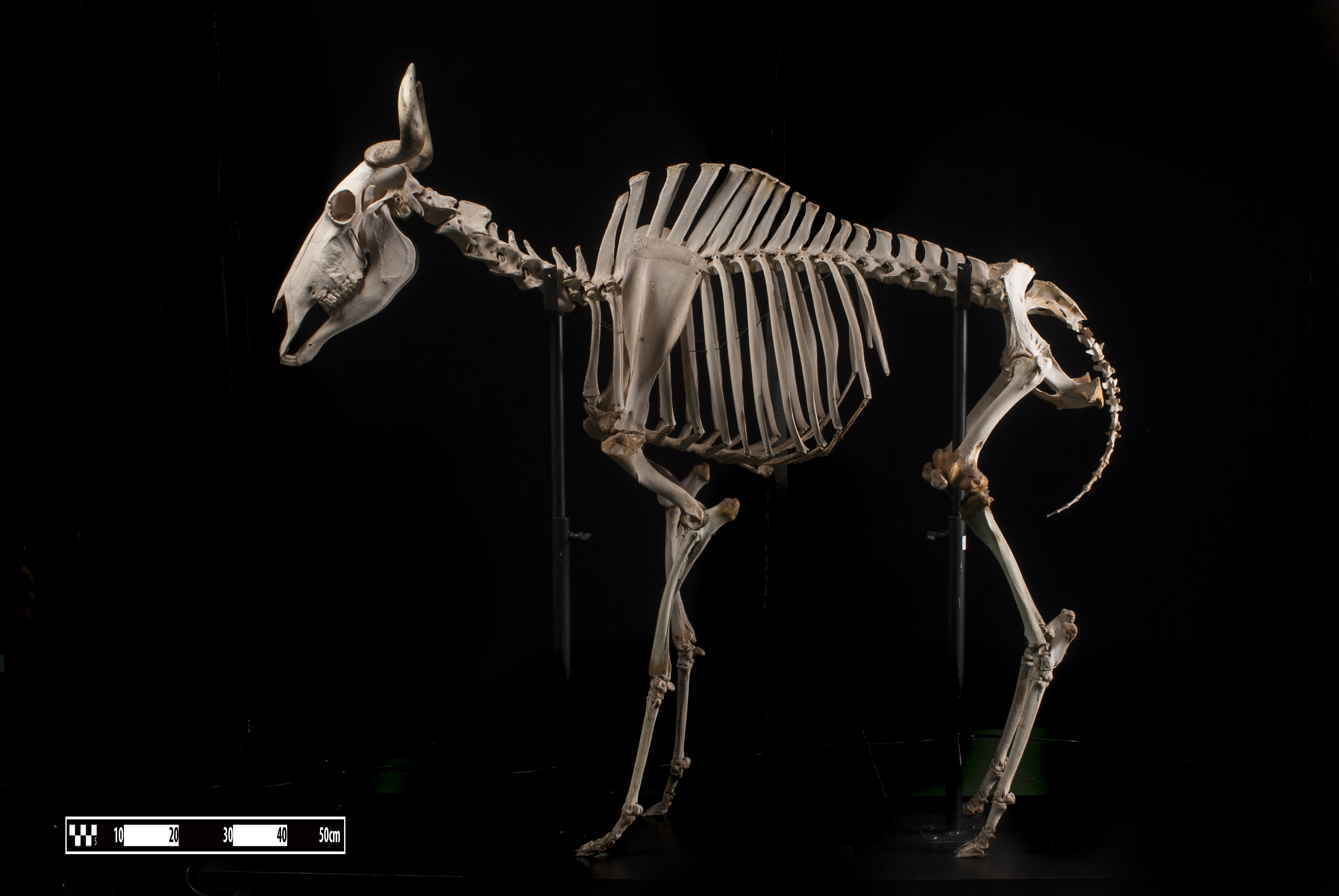
A skeleton photographed at the Museum of Veterinary Anatomy FMVZ USP, São Paulo, Brazil

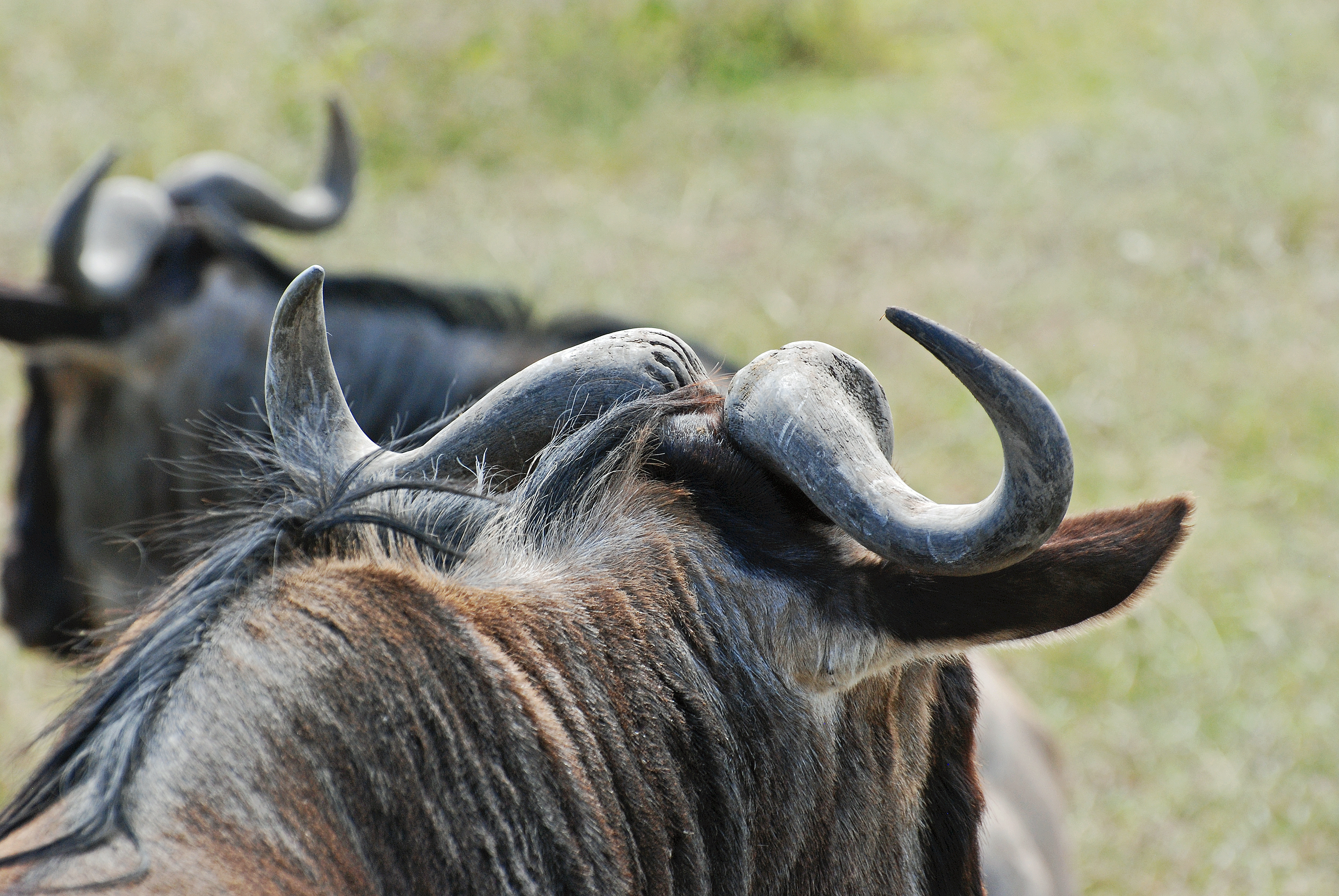
A close-up of the horns

The blue wildebeest exhibits sexual dimorphism, with males being larger and darker than females. The blue wildebeest is typically 1.7–2.4 m (5.6–7.9 ft) in head-and-body length. The average height of the species is 1.15–1.45 m (3.8–4.8 ft). Males typically weigh 165 to 290 kg (364 to 639 lb) and females weigh 140 to 260 kg (310 to 570 lb). A characteristic feature is the long, black tail, which is around 60–100 cm (2.0–3.3 ft) in length. All features and markings of this species are bilaterally symmetrical for both sexes. The average life span is 20 years in captivity. The oldest known captive individual lived for 24.3 years. The age that blue wildebeest live to in the wild is debatable.

Blue wildebeest have one of the most efficient locomotor muscles in terms of energy used for mechanical work and wasted as heat, with 62.6% of energy being converted into movement and the remainder in heat. They can travel up to 80 km (50 mi) in 5 days without drinking water, with average temperatures of 38 °C (100 °F) in peak times of the day.

=== Colouration ===
This broad-shouldered antelope has a muscular, front-heavy appearance, with a distinctive robust muzzle. Young are born tawny brown, and begin to take on their adult coloration at the age of 2 months. The adults' hues range from a deep slate or bluish-gray to light gray or even grayish-brown. The back and flanks are slightly lighter than the ventral surface and underparts. Dark brown, vertical stripes mark the area between the neck and the back of the ribcage, thus giving it the name "brindled gnu". The manes of both sexes appear long, stiff, thick, and jet black, the same colour as the tail and face. While the manes of the western and eastern white-bearded wildebeest are lank, those of the Nyassaland wildebeest and common wildebeest stick up. Scent glands, which secrete a clear oil, are present in the forefeet and are larger in males than females.

In terms of skull length, the smallest subspecies of the blue wildebeest is the western white-bearded wildebeest. It is also the darkest subspecies; the eastern white-bearded wildebeest is the lightest race. Both subspecies possess a creamy white beard, whereas the beard is black in both the Nyassaland wildebeest and the common wildebeest. The longest muzzles are found in the Nyassaland wildebeest, and the shortest in female western white-bearded wildebeest.

=== Horns ===
Both sexes possess a pair of large horns, which are shaped like parentheses. These extend outward to the side, and then curve upward and inward. In the males, the horns can be 83 cm (33 in) long, while the horns of the females are 30–40 cm (12–16 in) long. Despite being an antelope, the blue wildebeest possesses various bovine characteristics. For instance, the horns resemble those of the female African buffalo. Furthermore, the heavy build and disproportionately large forequarters give it a bovine appearance.

=== Interdigital glands ===
The blue wildebeest only has interdigital (hoof) glands in its fore legs. Analysis of chemical constituents from a free ranging animal in Zimbabwe (Cawston Block) showed this gland contains cyclohexanecarboxylic acid, phenol, 2-phenylethanol, methyl cyclohexanecarboxylate , and six short-chain carboxylic acids.

== Ecology and behavior ==
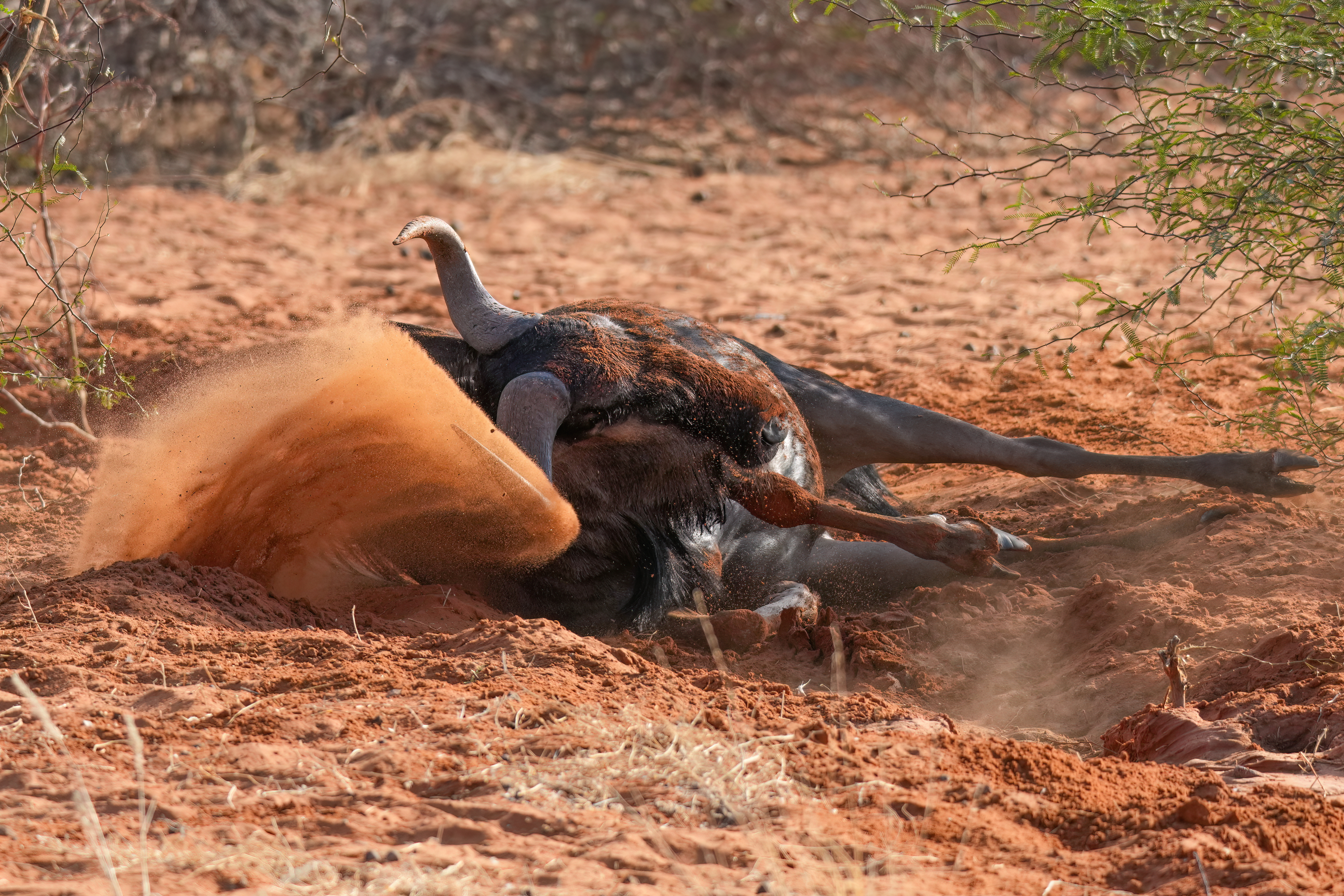
Blue wildebeest dust bathing in the Kalahari Desert of Namibia

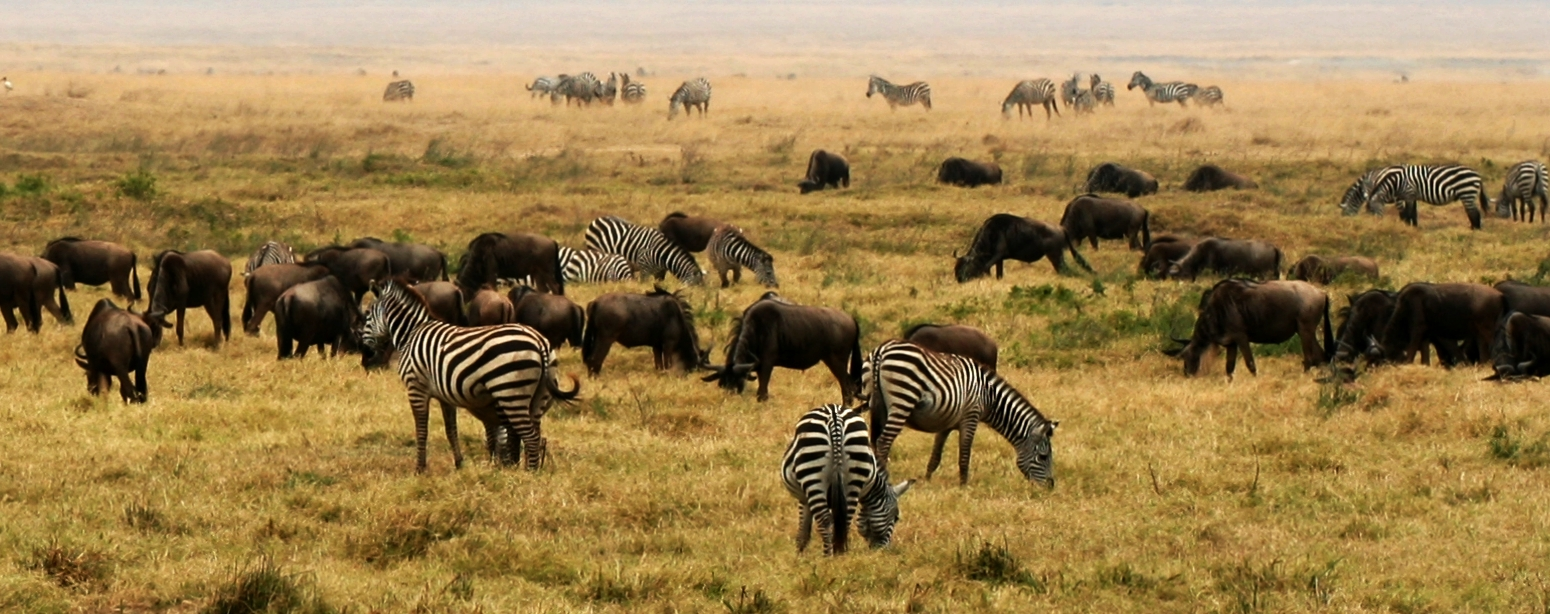
Plains zebra and blue wildebeest grazing at Ngorongoro Crater

The blue wildebeest is mostly active during the morning and the late afternoon, with the hottest hours of the day being spent in rest. These extremely agile and wary animals can run at speeds up to 80 km/h (50 mph), waving their tails and tossing their heads. An analysis of the activity of blue wildebeest at the Serengeti National Park showed that the animals devoted over half of their total time to rest, 33% to grazing, 12% to moving about (mostly walking), and a little to social interactions. However, variations existed among different age and sex groups.

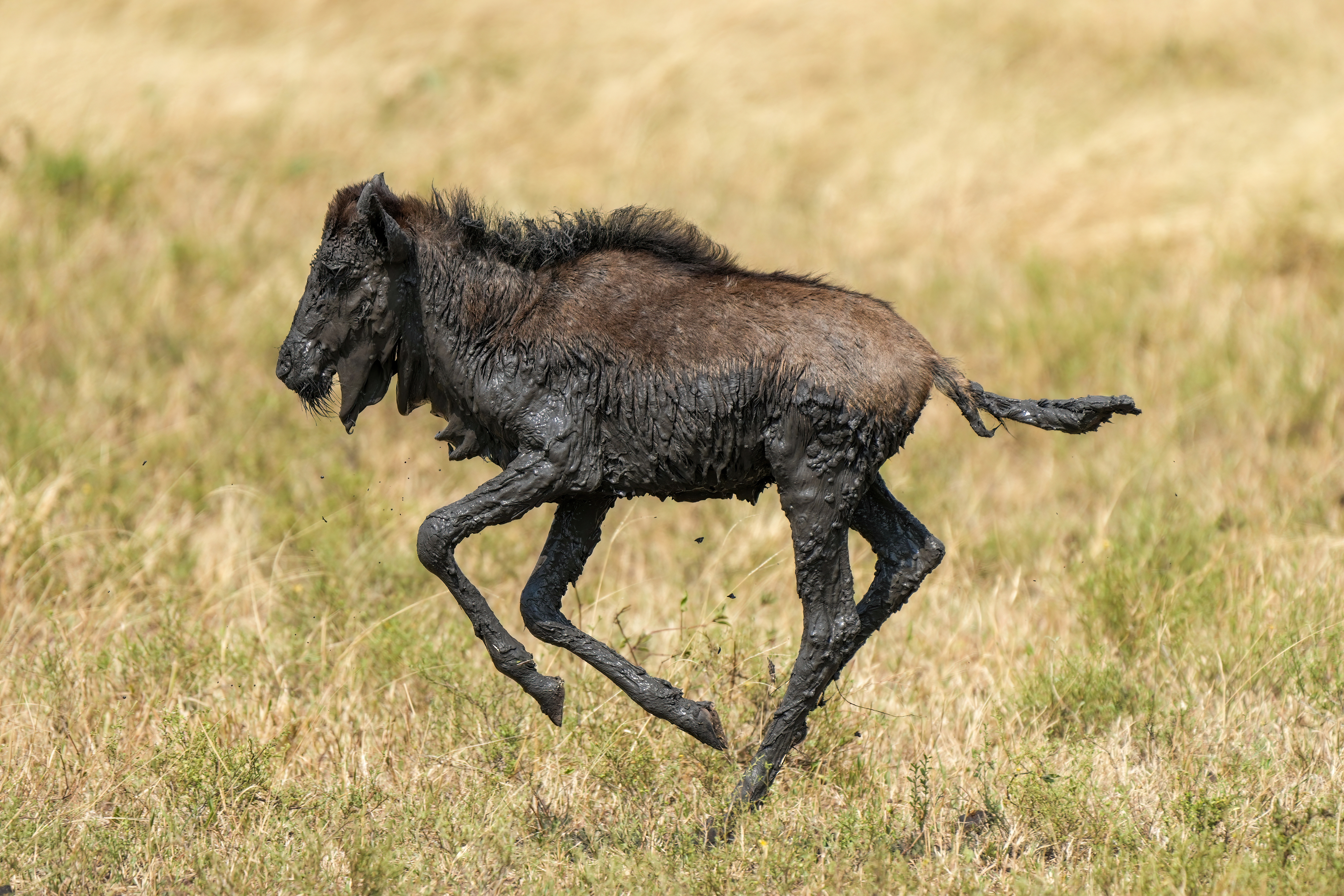
Juvenile blue wildebeest covered in mud running in Serengeti National Park

The wildebeest usually rest close to others of their kind and move about in loose aggregations. Males form bachelor herds, and these can be distinguished from juvenile groups by the lower amount of activity and the spacing between the animals. Around 90% of the male calves join the bachelor herds before the next mating season. Bulls become territorial at the age of four or five years, and become very noisy (most notably in the western white-bearded wildebeest) and active. The bulls tolerate being close to each other and 1 km^{2} (0.39 sq mi) of plain can accommodate 270 bulls. Most territories are of a temporary nature and fewer than half of the male population hold permanent territories.

In general, blue wildebeest rest in groups of a few to thousands at night, with a minimum distance of 1–2 m (3 ft 3 in – 6 ft 7 in) between individuals (though mothers and calves may remain in contact). They are a major prey item for lions, cheetahs, African leopards, African wild dogs, spotted hyenas and Nile crocodiles.

Female calves will stay with their mothers and other related females of the herd throughout their lives. Female individuals in a herd are from a wide range of ages, from yearlings to the oldest cow. During the wet season, the females generally lead the herd towards nutritious areas of grasses and areas where predators can be avoided. This is to ensure that newborn calves have the highest chance of survival as well as gaining the most nutritious milk.

Bulls mark the boundaries of their territories with heaps of dung, secretions from their scent glands, and certain behaviors. Body language used by a territorial male includes standing with an erect posture, profuse ground pawing, and horning, frequent defecation, rolling and bellowing, and the sound "ga-noo" being produced. When competing over territory, males grunt loudly, paw the ground, make thrusting motion with their horns, and perform other displays of aggression.

=== Diet ===
The blue wildebeest is a herbivore, feeding primarily on the short grasses which commonly grow on light, alkaline soils in savanna grasslands and on plains. Its broad mouth is adapted for eating large quantities of short grass, and it feeds during day and night. When grass is scarce, it also eats the foliage of shrubs and trees. Wildebeest commonly associate with plains zebras as the latter eat the upper, less nutritious grass canopy, exposing the lower, greener material which the wildebeest prefer. Whenever possible, the wildebeest likes to drink twice daily, and due to its regular requirement for water, it usually inhabits moist grasslands and areas with available water sources. The blue wildebeest drinks 9–12 L (2.0–2.6 imp gal; 2.4–3.2 US gal) of water every one to two days. Despite this, it can also survive in the arid Kalahari Desert, where it obtains sufficient water from melons and water-storing roots and tubers.

In a study of the dietary habits of the wildebeest, the animals were found to be feeding on the three dominant kinds of grass of the area, namely: Themeda triandra, Digitaria macroblephara, and Pennisetum mezianum. The time spent grazing increased by about 100% during the dry season. Though the choice of the diet remained the same in both the dry and the wet season, the animals were more selective during the latter.

=== Reproduction ===
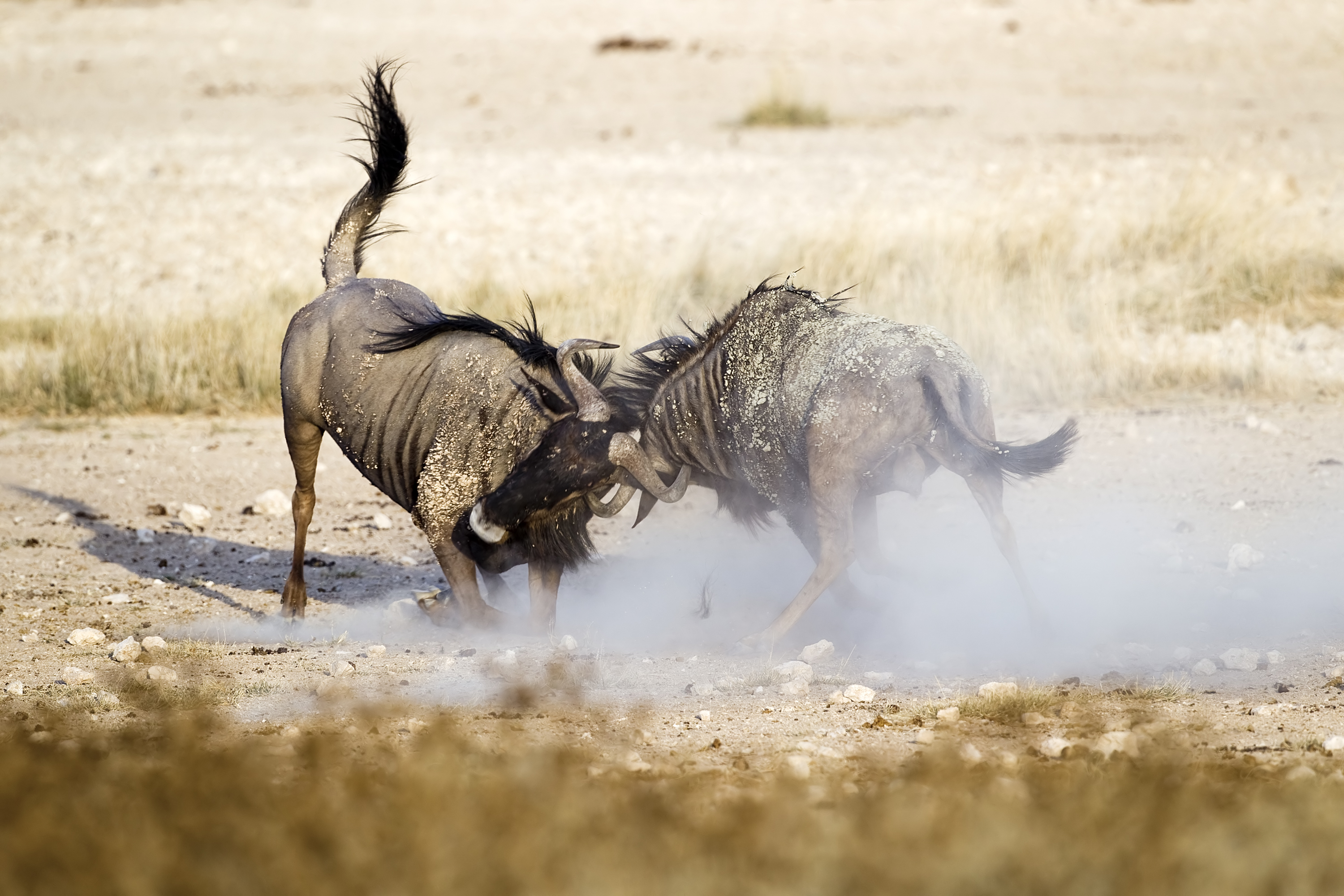
Two male blue wildebeest fighting

Male blue wildebeest become sexually mature at about 2 years of age, while females can conceive at 16 months if adequately nourished. Nevertheless, most females do not start to breed until a year later. The mating season, which lasts for about 3 weeks, coincides with the end of the rainy season. This means that the animals are in good condition, having been feeding on highly nutritious new grass growth, and the conception rate is often as high as 95%. The mating season, or rut, typically begins on the night of a full moon, suggesting that the lunar cycle influences breeding. During this time, testosterone production peaks in males, resulting in increased calling and territorial behavior. The activities of these sexually excited males may also stimulate the female to come into estrus.

As they scout out their territories and compete for females, males exhibit rivalry. When they clash, they face up to each other with bent knees and exchange horn thrusts. Elaborate individual displays are made during their rivalry, and they may bellow, snort, and dig their horns into the ground. Once dominance has been established, each male attempts to lure the female into his domain. During courtship, urination and low-stretch are common activities, and the male soon attempts to mount the female. A receptive female holds her tail to one side and stands still while copulation takes place. Matings may be repeated several times and may take place twice or more times within a minute. The male neither eats nor rests when a female is present in his territory, and during this time, the female keeps close to the male, often rubbing her head on his torso and sniffing his penis. While in season, a female may visit several territories and mate with several different males.

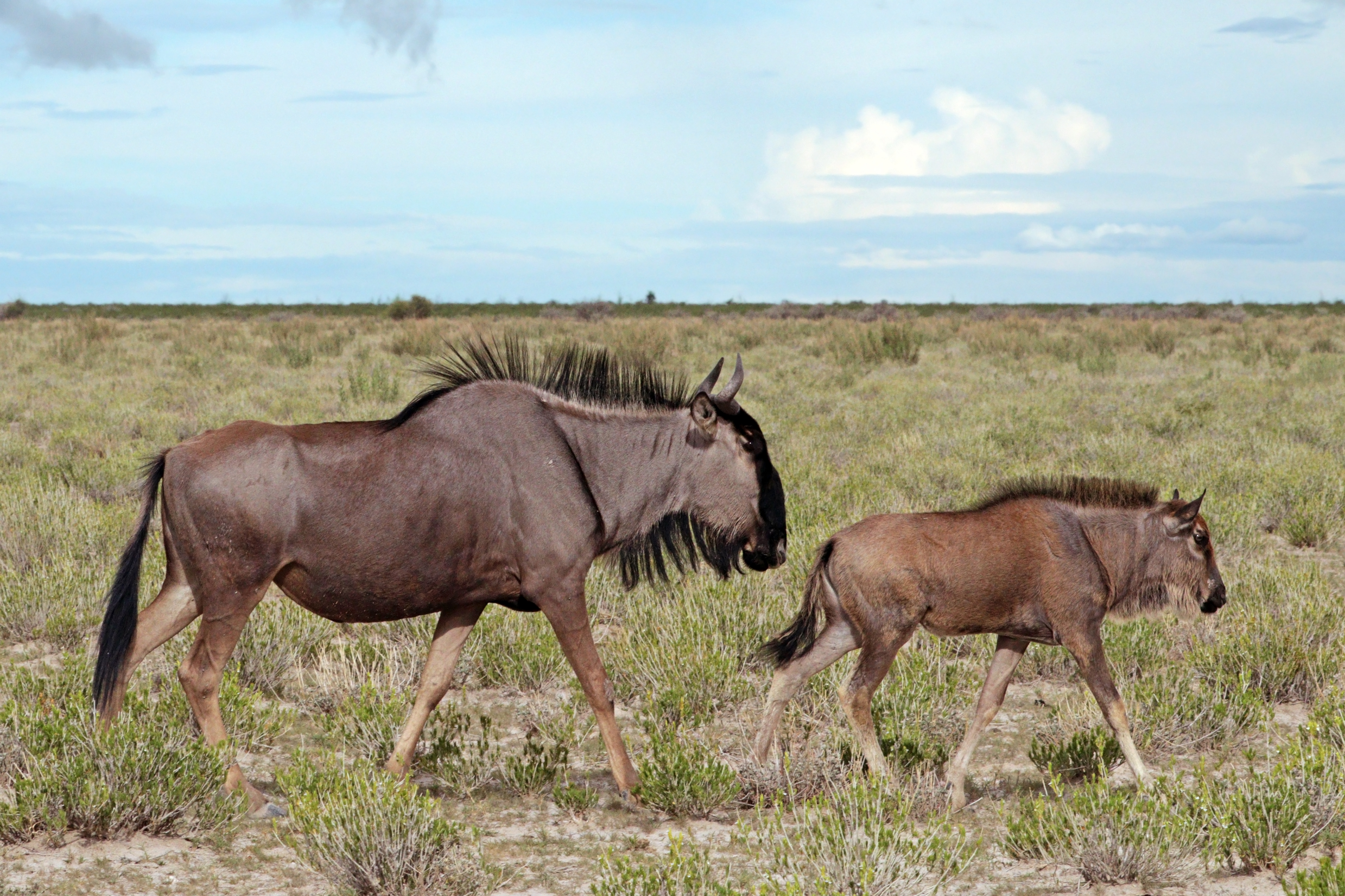
A female and her calf

The gestation period is about 8.5 months, and 80–90% of the calves are born within a 3-week time period. Female wildebeest give birth in the middle of a herd rather than alone, and typically in the middle of the day. This allows time for the newborn to become steady on its feet before night falls and the predators become more active.

Calves weigh about 19 kg (42 lb) at birth, and can usually stand on their own within a few minutes of birth. To escape predation, calves remain close to their mothers for a significant time, and may continue suckling until the next year's calf is nearly due. Male calves leave their mother at about 8 months and form herds with other male juveniles. In large female herds, 80% of the wildebeest offspring survive the first month, compared to a 50% survival rate in smaller herds.

=== Diseases and parasites ===
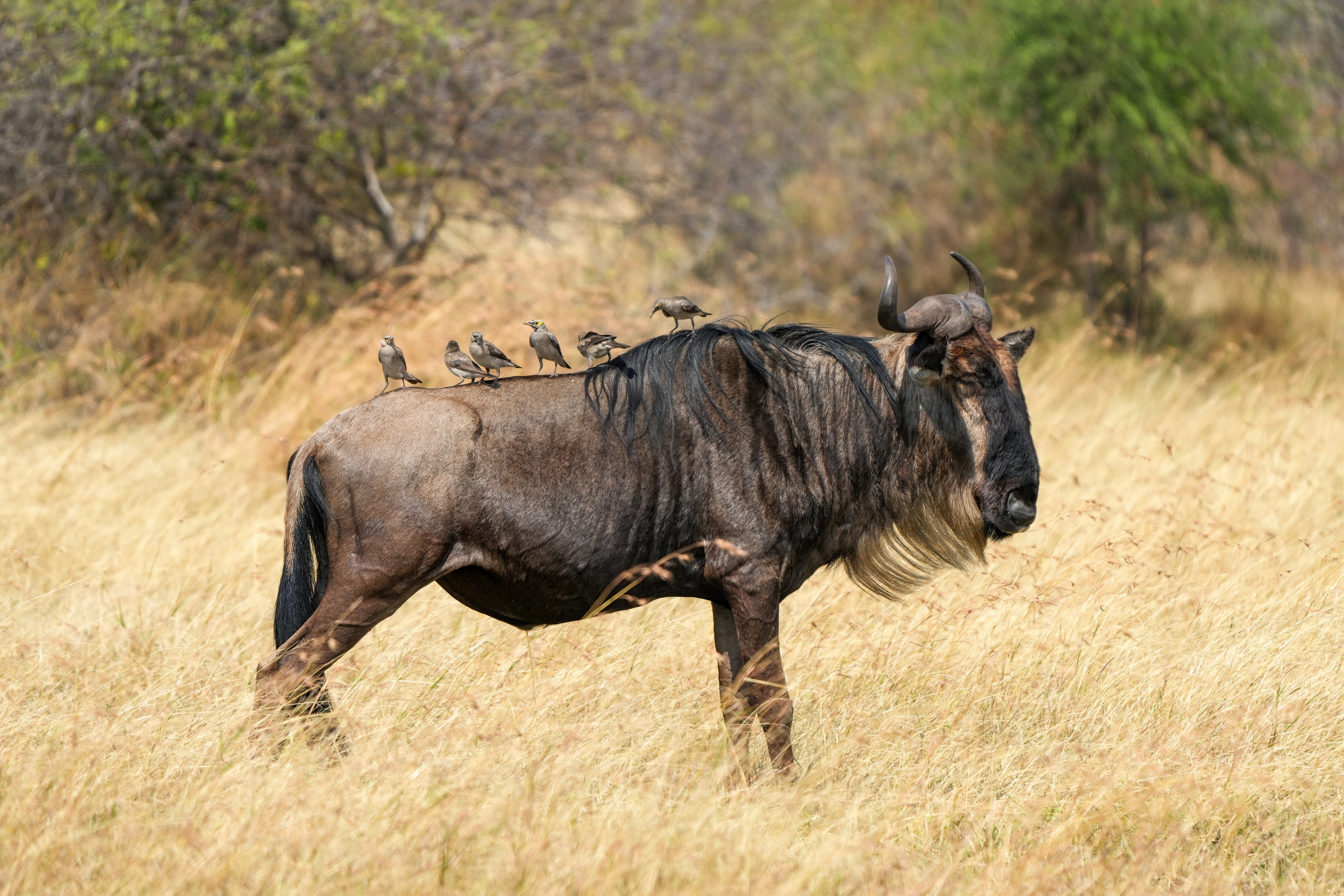
Wattled starlings eating ticks of a blue wildebeest in the Serengeti National Park

The blue wildebeest is susceptible to foot-and-mouth disease, anthrax, sarcoptic mange, and hoof gangrene. The herpesvirus was first isolated from the blue wildebeest in 1960 by veterinary scientist Walter Plowright. Although the causes of death vary from year to year, in one drought in Botswana, young calves and aged females were the most likely to die. On another occasion, an estimated 47% of deaths were caused by disease, 37% were due to predation, and the remainder were the result of accidents.

The animal can be host to a number of different parasites. In one study, blue wildebeest were found to be hosts to 13 species of nematodes, one trematode, larvae of five oestrid flies, three species of lice, seven ixodid tick species, one mite, and the larvae of a tongue worm. Of these, most were more prevalent at some times of the year than others. Generally, the larvae of Gedoelstica and Oestrus occur in the nasal passages and respiratory cavities of the blue wildebeest, and sometimes migrate to the brain. Compared to some other bovids, blue wildebeest are resistant to infestations by several species of ticks.

== Distribution and habitat ==
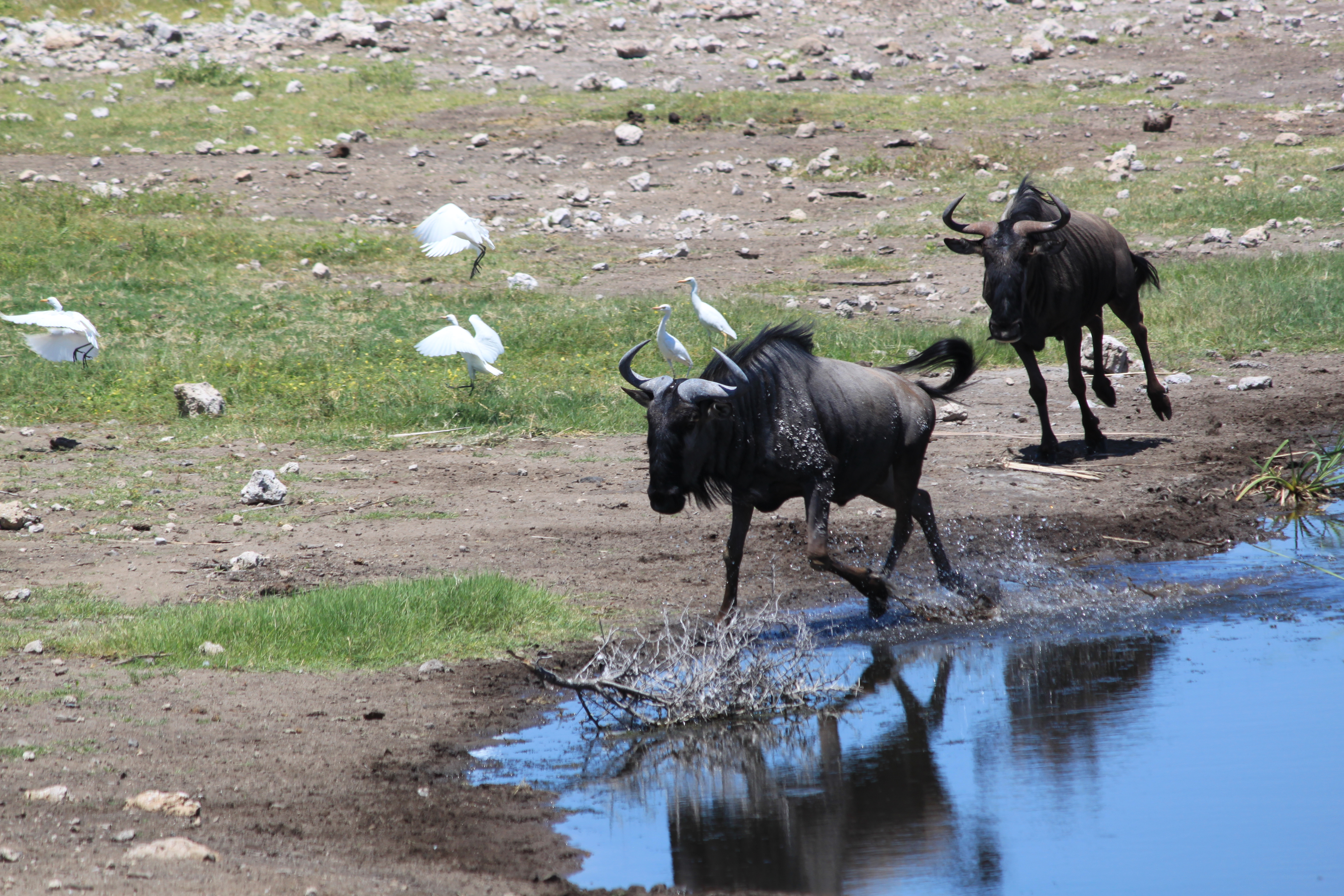
Blue wildebeest inhabit places where water is available.

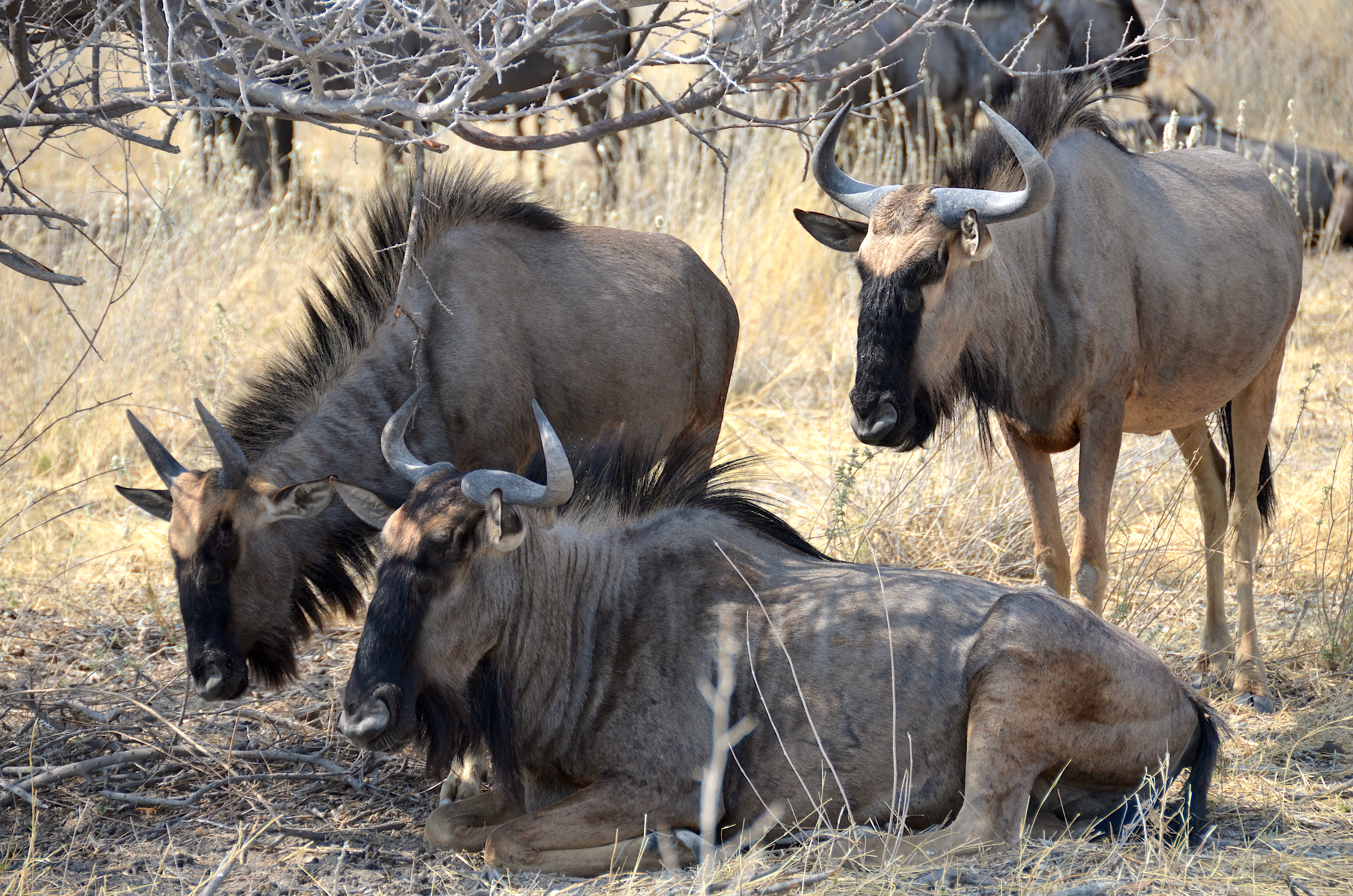
Blue wildebeest at Etosha National Park

The blue wildebeest is native to Kenya, Tanzania, Botswana, Zambia, Zimbabwe, Mozambique, South Africa, Eswatini, and Angola. Today, it is extinct in Malawi, but has been successfully reintroduced into Namibia.

Blue wildebeest are mainly found in short-grass plains bordering bush-covered acacia savannas in southern and eastern Africa, thriving in areas that are neither too wet nor too arid. They can be found in habitats that vary from overgrazed areas with dense bush to open woodland floodplains. Trees such as Brachystegia and Combretum spp. are common in these areas. Blue wildebeest can tolerate arid regions as long as a potable water supply is available, normally within about 15–25 km (9.3–15.5 mi) distance.

The southern limit of the blue wildebeest stops at the Orange River, while the western limit is bounded by Lake Victoria and Mount Kenya. The range does not include montane or temperate grasslands. These wildebeest are rarely found at altitudes over 1,800–2,100 m (5,900–6,900 ft). With the exception of a small population of Cookson's wildebeest that occurs in the Luangwa Valley (Zambia), the wildebeest is absent in the wetter parts of the southern savanna country, and particularly is not present in miombo woodlands.

Three African populations of blue wildebeest take part in long-distance migrations, timed to coincide with the annual pattern of rainfall and grass growth on the short-grass plains, where they can find the nutrient-rich forage necessary for lactation and calf growth. The timing of the migration in both directions can vary considerably from year to year. At the end of the rainy season, they migrate to dry-season areas in response to a lack of drinking water. When the rainy season begins again a few months later, the animals trek back to their wet-season range. These movements and access to nutrient-rich forage for reproduction allow migratory wildebeest populations to grow to much larger numbers than resident populations. Many long-distance migratory populations of wildebeest existed 100 years ago, but currently, all but three migrations (Serengeti, Tarangire, and Kafue) have been disrupted, cut off, and lost.

== Threats and conservation ==
Major human-related factors affecting populations include large-scale deforestation, the drying up of water sources, the expansion of settlements and poaching. Diseases of domestic cattle such as sleeping sickness can be transmitted to the animals and take their toll. The erection of fences that interrupt traditional migratory routes between wet and dry-season ranges have resulted in mass death events when the animals become cut off from water sources and the areas of better grazing they are seeking during droughts. A study of the factors influencing wildebeest populations in the Maasai Mara ecosystem revealed that the populations had undergone a drastic decline of around 80% from about 119,000 individuals in 1977 to around 22,000 twenty years later. The major cause of this was thought to be the expansion of agriculture, which led to the loss of wet-season grazing and the traditional calving and breeding ranges. Similarly, drastic declines have recently occurred in the Tarangire wildebeest migration.

The total number of blue wildebeest is estimated to be around 1,550,000. The population trend overall is unstable and the numbers in the Serengeti National Park (Tanzania) have increased to about 1,300,000. The population density ranges from 0.15/km^{2} in Hwange and Etosha National Parks to 35/km^{2} in Ngorongoro Crater and Serengeti National Park, where they are most plentiful. Blue wildebeest have also been introduced into a number of private game farms, reserves, and conservancy areas. For these reasons, the International Union for Conservation of Nature rates the blue wildebeest as being of least concern. However, the numbers of the eastern white-bearded wildebeest (C. t. albojubatus) have seen a steep decline to a current level of roughly 6,000 to 8,000 animals, which has been causing slight concern. The population of other subspecies are including; 150,000 in common wildebeest (C. t. taurinus), 5,000–75,000 in Nyassaland wildebeest (C. t. johnstoni), 5,000–10,000 in Cookson's wildebeest (C. t. cooksoni).

== Relationship with humans ==
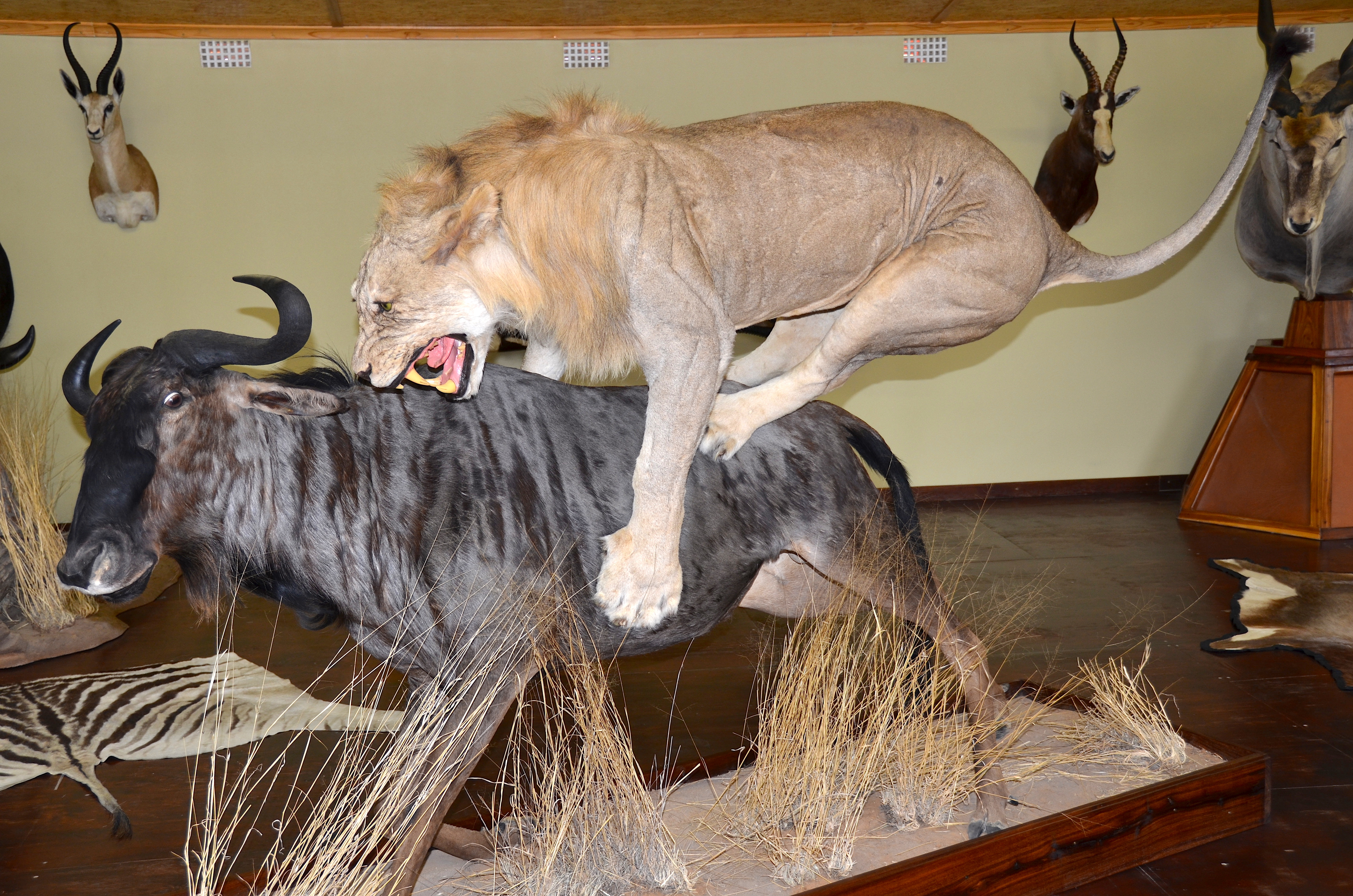
Taxidermied lion and blue wildebeest, Namibia

As one of the major herbivores of southern and eastern Africa, the blue wildebeest is one of the animals that draw tourists to the area to observe big game, and as such, it is of major economic importance to the region. Traditionally, blue wildebeest have been hunted for their hides and meat, the skin making good-quality leather, though the flesh is coarse, dry, and rather tough.

However, blue wildebeest can also affect human beings negatively. They can compete with domestic livestock for grazing and water and can transmit fatal diseases like rinderpest to cattle and cause epidemics among animals. They can also spread ticks, lungworms, tapeworms, flies, and paramphistome flukes.

An ancient carved slab of slate depicting an animal very similar to the blue wildebeest has been discovered. Dating back to around 3000 BC, it was found in Hierakonpolis (Nekhen), which used to be the religious and political capital of Upper Egypt at that time. This may be evidence that the animal used to occur in North Africa and was associated with the ancient Egyptians.
