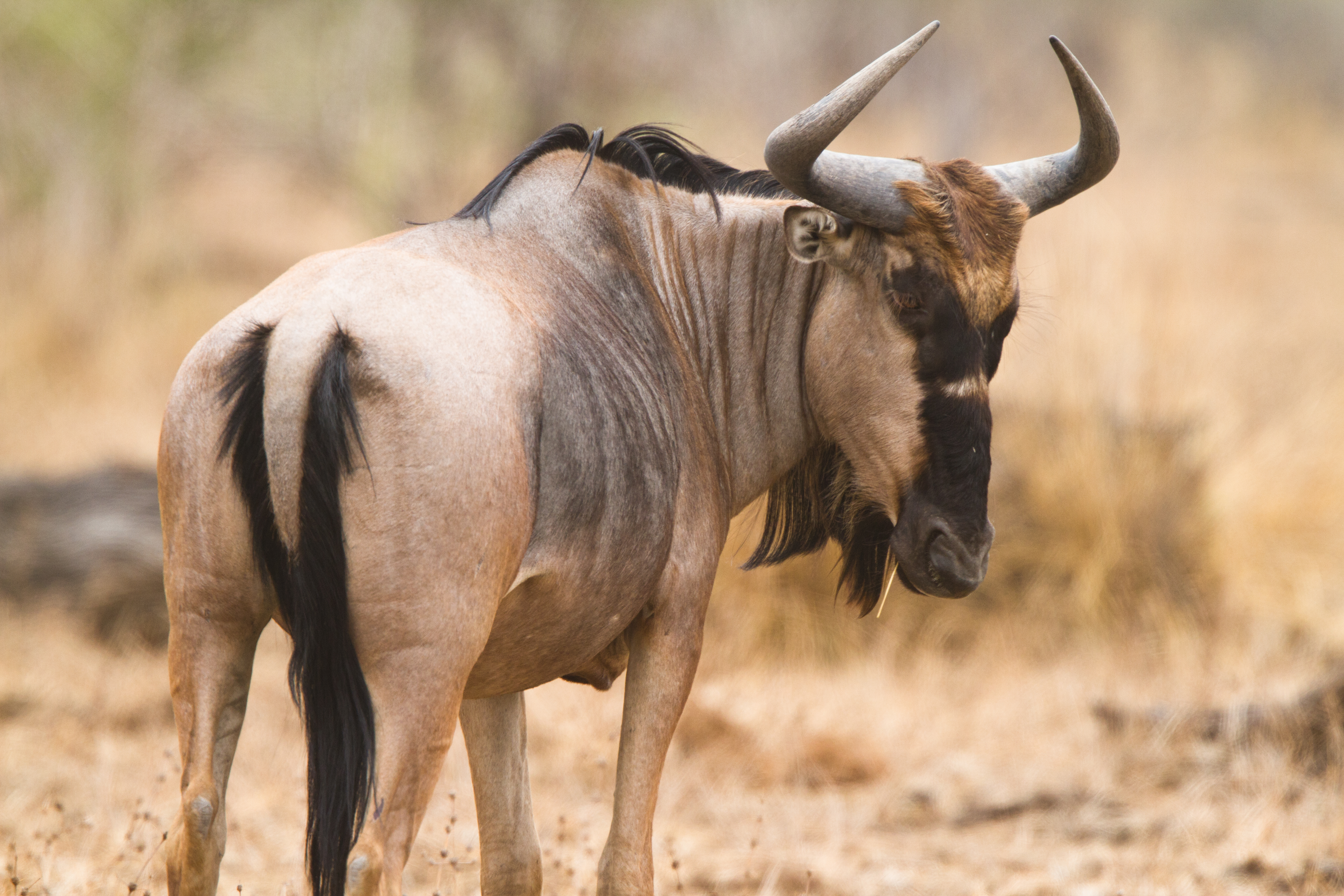
- An individual at South Luangwa National Park in Zambia

Conservation status
- Least Concern (IUCN 3.1)

Scientific classification
- Kingdom: Animalia
- Phylum: Chordata
- Class: Mammalia
- Order: Artiodactyla
- Family: Bovidae
- Subfamily: Alcelaphinae
- Genus: Connochaetes
- Species: C. taurinus
- Subspecies: C. t. cooksoni

Trinomial name
- Connochaetes taurinus cooksoni Blaine, 1914
- C. t. cooksoni range (light brown)

= Cookson's wildebeest =

Subspecies of antelope

Cookson's wildebeest (Connochaetes taurinus cooksoni) is a subspecies of the blue wildebeest that is native to the Luangwa Valley in Zambia with occasional sightings in Malawi. It is the largest subspecies amongst the blue wildebeests and has a larger body and bigger horns. It is listed as least concern in the IUCN red list.

== Taxonomy ==
Cookson's wildebeest is a subspecies of the blue wildebeest (Connochaetes taurinus). The species was first described in 1914.

== Distribution and habitat ==
The species is native to the Luangwa Valley in Zambia. Occasionally, herds of the subspecies travel into central Malawi depending on the rainfall patterns and grass available for feeding. It is listed as Least Concern by the IUCN Red List, for there are no serious threats imposed on the subspecies besides poaching.

== Morphology and behavior ==
Cookson’s wildebeest have a dark face with long hairs on the hump and tail. It has a bigger body and horns compared to other subspecies of the blue wildebeest. It also is a lighter color than the main subspecies.

The Cookson’s wildebeest is a herbivore that generally feeds on tall grasses on the African plains, although they sometimes feed on small shrubs and trees when grass is scarce. They are mostly diurnal, active during early mornings, and in the afternoons when the temperatures are lower.

The wildebeests generally breed during the rainy season. Females often give birth to a single calf after about 36 weeks of gestation. They usually give birth during the day, and the calf can stand on its foot almost as soon as it is born. Common predators of this species includes African lions, hyenas, African wild dogs, and cheetahs.
