= Vili (disambiguation) =

Vili may be:

- a Norse deity, see Vili and Ve
- a people of Gabon and Congo-Brazzaville, see Vili people
- a male first name in Finland
- a male nickname in Hungary (short for Vilmos)
- the trading name of Vili Milisits, South Australian baker, businessman and philanthropist
- '-vili' a common name ending in Georgian, see Georgian names
- the surname of the following people:
  - Tanner Vili (born 1981), Samoan rugby union player
  - Valerie Adams (formerly Valerie Vili) (born 1984), New Zealand shot putter
- ventilator-induced lung injury (VILI)

== See also ==
- Villi (disambiguation)
- Vily (disambiguation)
