= Vily =

Vily may refer to:

- Vily, Malagasy common name for species in the fish genus Eleotris
- Vily, Malagasy common name for the fish Teramulus kieneri
- Vily, a plural of vila (fairy)

== See also ==
- Vili (disambiguation)
