= Paramphistomum =

Scientific classification
- Kingdom: Animalia
- Phylum: Platyhelminthes
- Class: Trematoda
- Order: Plagiorchiida
- Family: Paramphistomidae
- Genus: Paramphistomum; Fischoeder, 1901

Type species
- Paramphistomum cervi Zeder, 1790

Genus of flukes

Paramphistomum is a genus of parasitic flatworms belonging to the digenetic trematodes. It includes flukes which are mostly parasitising livestock ruminants, as well as some wild mammals. They are responsible for the serious disease called paramphistomiasis, also known as amphistomosis, especially in cattle and sheep. Its symptoms include profuse diarrhoea, anaemia, lethargy, and often result in death if untreated. They are found throughout the world, and most abundantly in livestock farming regions such as Australia, Asia, Africa, Eastern Europe, and Russia.

The generic name was introduced by F. Fischoeder in 1901 for the replacement of the then existing genus Amphistoma (Rudolphi, 1809). Under the new genus he redescribed both Paramphistomum cervi and P. bothriophoron and designated the former as the type species.

== Species ==
Due to striking resemblance with each other and with other amphistomes, a number of described species are known to be synonymous. Some important species are:

- Paramphistomum cervi
- Paramphistomum cotylophorum
- Paramphistomum cracile
- Paramphistomum gotoi
- Paramphistomum grande
- Paramphistomum hiberniae
- Paramphistomum ichikawai
- Paramphistomum epiclitum
- Paramphistomum explanatum
- Paramphistomum leydeni
- Paramphistomum liorchis
- Paramphistomum microbothrioides
- Paramphistomum phillerouxi

== Description ==
The generic name (Greek: para meaning "similar" [to Amphistoma], amphi meaning "on both sides", and stoma for "mouth") is given due to the presence of an anterior oral sucker and a posterior larger ventral sucker in adult worms. The body is minute, measuring less than a centimetre. The body is covered with a highly folded tegument, which in turn is provided with sensory papillae. Paramphistomum are all hermaphrodite, having both male and female reproductive systems in the posterior region of the body.

== Life cycle ==
Their life cycle is indirect, requiring a definitive host such as ruminants, an intermediate host such as snail, and a free-living of external phases in water and plants. The sexually mature monoecious self-fertilises in the mammalian rumen, and release the eggs along with faeces. Eggs hatch in water into ciliated miracidia. The miracidia then enters the body of an intermediate host, which are snails belonging to the genera Bulinus, Planorbis, Physa Stagnicola and Pseudosuccinea. Then the miracidia lost their cilia to become sporocysts. After a few days they develop up to 8 rediae, which are rapidly liberated. Each redia contains about 15-30 cercariae. Mature cercariae are possess by two eyespots and a long slender tail, by which they find aquatic plants or other suitable substrata, to which they get attached and encyst to become metacercariae. The mammalian hosts ingest the infective larvae. Once inside the duodenum and jejunum, their cysts are removed. They penetrate the intestinal wall by actively destroying the mucosa, and then migrate to the rumen, where they grow into adults.

== Pathogenicity and pathology ==
Paramphistomiasis causes enteritis and anaemia in livestock mammals and result in substantial production and economic losses. Pathological symptoms are produced by immature flukes. When the young flukes start to gather in the intestine, there is a watery and fetid diarrhoea which is often associated with high mortality (even up to 80-90%) in ruminants. At a given time, as many as 30,000 flukes may accumulate, fervently attacking the duodenal mucosa to induce acute enteritis. Adult flukes are relatively harmless, but in buffaloes liver lesions have been reported. Liver tissue resulted damaged extensively, indicated by swelling, haemorrhage, discolouration, necrosis, bile duct hyperplasia, and fibrosis.

== Diagnosis and treatment ==
Symptoms are easily indicated by infected sheep and cattle as they become severely anorexic or inefficiently digest food, and become unthrifty. Fetid diarrhoea is an obvious indication so that fluid faeces are examined for immature flukes.

Paramphistomiasis is considered a neglected tropical disease, with no prescription drug for treatment and control. Thus management of infection is based mainly on control of the snail population. Drugs shown to be effective are resorantel, oxyclozanide, clorsulon, ivermectin, niclosamide, bithional and levamisole. An in vitro demonstration shows that plumbagin exhibits high efficacy on adult flukes.
