= Villus =

Villus (Latin: "shaggy hair", pl.: villi) may refer to:

- Intestinal villus, refers to any one of the small, finger-shaped outgrowths of the epithelial lining of the wall of the intestine. Clusters of projections are referred as intestinal villi.
- Chorionic villi, found on the surface of the outermost membrane (the chorion) of the fetus
- Arachnoid villi, located on the arachnoid membrane of the brain
- Villiform teeth, small, slender teeth in fish, forming velvety bands.

== See also ==
- Villi (disambiguation)
