= Christian Villi =

Italian football coach (born 1974)

Personal information
- Date of birth: 5 March 1974 (age 52)
- Place of birth: Forlì, Emilia-Romagna, Italy

Managerial career
- Years: Team
- 2018-: Columbia College Koalas

Christian Villi (born March 5, 1974) is an Italian soccer coach. He is an NAIA collegiate soccer coach who currently serves as the assistant coach at the Columbia College Koalas men's soccer program in Columbia, South Carolina. The college is a member of the National Association of Intercollegiate Athletics (NAIA), competing in the Appalachian Athletic Conference (AAC). He is the former Bahamas national beach soccer team head coach, as well as a CONCACAF and FIFA beach soccer coach and referee instructor.

== Playing career ==
Villi was born and raised in Forlì, Italy. He played locally for a.s.d Pianta and in a number of other youth programs, including U.S. Bertinoro Colonna 86 and a.s.d Tre Martiri.

After graduating from high school he moved to Nassau, Bahamas. He played between 1994 and 2000 in the now defunct NPFL first division league for Grasshoppers FC. There, he earned the Rookie of the Year award in 1994, playing as a striker and scoring 10 goals.

As a player, he won the 2005-06 Bahamas National Championship, playing as a left back for the Caledonia Celtics.

He continued playing in the BFA Senior League first division until the age of 40 as a player coach for FC Nassau Pirates. He subsequently finished his career at Baha Juniors FC.

== Coaching career ==
Villi was offered his first paid coaching position at age 16 at Calcio Forli in his hometown by the director of soccer Rino Montanari. One of his first mentors was Fulvio Zuccheri.

After moving to the Bahamas, he had a short stint coaching Bears FC, but mostly spent time developing young players from disadvantaged communities in the Nassau inner city.

In 2006, he took over the Bahamas Soccer Academy and started developing young players around Nassau. In 2007 he also took over FC Nassau Pirates and transformed it into a full club, with a new permanent location in Blair Park and teams in every competitive age group. Later, the technical director of the Bahamas national team, Neider dos Santos, offered him to guide the U17 national team and coach the National Development Academy for the 2007 season. In 2008, after taking a FIFA course with then US Beach Soccer National team coach and FIFA instructor Roberto Ceciliano, he was offered to coach the Bahamas national beach soccer team. With the team, he participated in the 2009 and 2010 CONCACAF Beach Soccer Championship, which serves as the qualifier for the FIFA Beach Soccer World Cup. Villi continued running the program until his resignation in 2012.

Afterwards, Villi became a soccer coach at Tambearly International School, where he was a sports director and led its soccer team to win the U12 BFA 2016 soccer season and cup.

In 2018, he moved to the US and worked as an assistant coach for Columbia College men's soccer team in South Carolina. He also coaches Irmo High School varsity girls soccer team and Lexington Soccer Academy U14 Girls, and ODP (Olympic Development Program) for South Carolina soccer.
