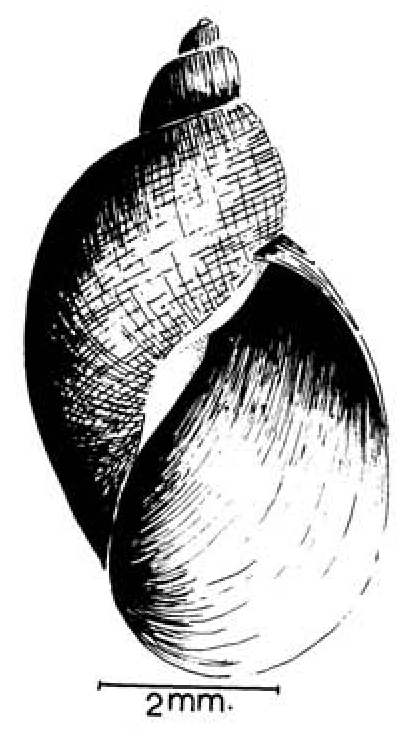
- An apertural view of a shell of Pseudosuccinea columella, scale bar, 2 mm

Scientific classification
- Kingdom: Animalia
- Phylum: Mollusca
- Class: Gastropoda
- Superorder: Hygrophila
- Family: Lymnaeidae
- Subfamily: Lymnaeinae
- Genus: Pseudosuccinea (Say, 1817)

= Pseudosuccinea =

Genus of gastropods

Pseudosuccinea is a genus of air-breathing freshwater snails, aquatic pulmonate gastropod mollusks in the family Lymnaeidae, the pond snails.

In this genus, the shells are very similar to those of the land snail genus Succinea, which belongs to a different family.

== Species ==
Species within the genus Pseudosuccinea include:

- Pseudosuccinea columella (Say, 1817)
- † Pseudosuccinea dineana (D. W. Taylor, 1957)
