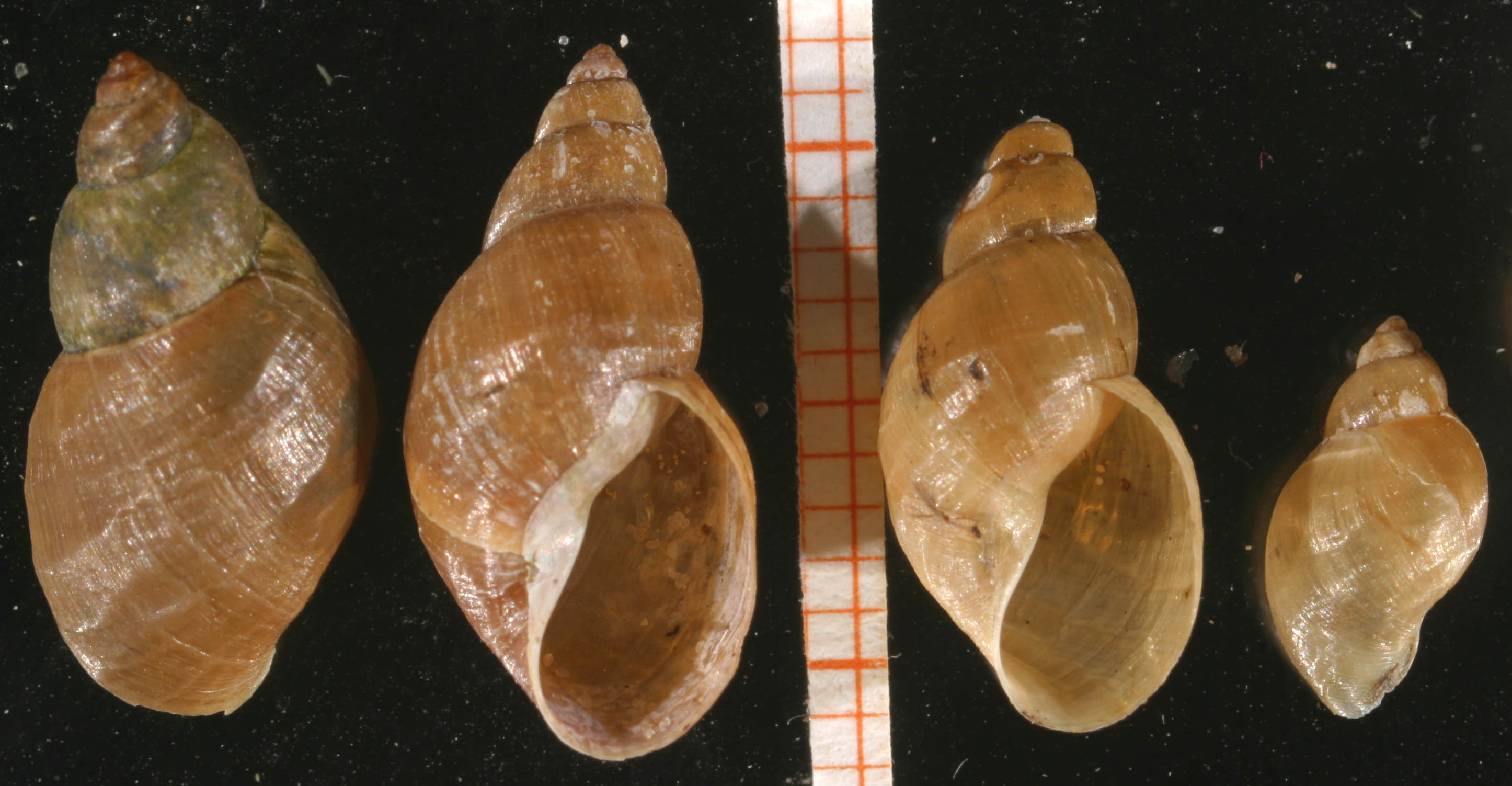
- Four shells of Stagnicola palustris

Scientific classification
- Domain: Eukaryota
- Kingdom: Animalia
- Phylum: Mollusca
- Class: Gastropoda
- Superorder: Hygrophila
- Family: Lymnaeidae
- Subfamily: Lymnaeinae
- Genus: Stagnicola; Jeffreys, 1830

Type species
- Buccinum palustre O. F. Müller, 1774

Synonyms
- Berlaniana Kruglov & Starobogatov, 1986; Corvusiana Servain, 1882; Corvusiana (Corvusiana) Servain, 1881; Costolimnaea B. Dybowski, 1913; Galba (Stagnicola) Jeffreys, 1830; Limnaea (Corvusiana) Servain, 1882; Limnaea (Fenziana) Servain, 1882; Limnaea (Limnophysa) Fitzinger, 1833; Limnaea (Palustrisiana) Servain, 1882; Limnaea (Stagnicola) Jeffreys, 1830; Limnaeus (Limnophysa) Fitzinger, 1833; Limnea (Limnophysa) Fitzinger, 1833; Limnophysa Fitzinger, 1833; Lymnaea (Corvusiana) Servain, 1882; Lymnaea (Fenziana) Servain, 1881; Lymnaea (Kuesterilymnaea) Vinarski, 2003; Lymnaea (Limnophysa) Fitzinger, 1833; Lymnaea (Palustrisiana) Servain, 1882; Lymnaea (Stagnicola) Jeffreys, 1830; Microlimnaea W. Dybowski, 1908; Palustria W. Dybowski, 1908; Stagnicola (Corvusiana) Servain, 1882; Stagnicola (Kuesterilymnaea) Vinarski, 2003; Stagnicola (Stagnicola) Jeffreys, 1830; Turrilimnaea W. Dybowski, 1908

= Stagnicola (gastropod) =

Genus of gastropods

Stagnicola is a genus of air-breathing freshwater snails, aquatic pulmonate gastropod mollusks in the family Lymnaeidae, the pond snails.

== Species ==
The genus includes the following species:

- †Stagnicola albiconicus (D. W. Taylor, 1957)
- †Stagnicola armaniacensis (Noulet, 1857)
- †Stagnicola bouilleti (Michaud, 1855)
- †Stagnicola bowmananus (Pierce, 2001)
- †Stagnicola bucciniformis (Sacco, 1886)
- Stagnicola callomphala (Servain, 1882)
- †Stagnicola compactus (Martinson, 1954)
- †Stagnicola corneus (Brongniart, 1810)
- Stagnicola corvus (Gmelin, 1791)
- †Stagnicola couleensis F. C. Baker, 1929
- †Stagnicola fabulum (Brongniart, 1810)
- †Stagnicola forbesi (Gaudry & P. Fischer, 1867)
- Stagnicola fuscus (C. Pfeiffer, 1821)
- †Stagnicola glabraeformis (Gottschick, 1911)
- Stagnicola gloeeri (Vinarski, 2011)
- Stagnicola iliensis (Lazareva, 1967)
- †Stagnicola jaccardi (Maillard, 1892)
- Stagnicola kayseris Glöer & Yıldırım, 2006
- †Stagnicola kreutzii (Łomnicki, 1886)
- †Stagnicola laurillardianus (Noulet, 1854)
- †Stagnicola limnaeiformis (Martinson, 1954)
- †Stagnicola longiscatus (Brongniart, 1810)
- †Stagnicola mammertensis (Jodot & Rey, 1956)
- †Stagnicola martinsonianus (Popova, 1964)
- Stagnicola montenegrinus Glöer & Pešić, 2009
- †Stagnicola morini (Dollfus, 1920)
- †Stagnicola orelongo (Boubée, 1831)
- †Stagnicola pachygaster (Thomä, 1845)
- †Stagnicola palustriformis (Gottschick, 1911)
- Stagnicola palustris (O. F. Müller, 1774)
- †Stagnicola praebouilleti Schlickum, 1970
- †Stagnicola reinholdkunzi Harzhauser & Neubauer, 2012
- †Stagnicola saratogensis L. S. Russell, 1956
- Stagnicola saridalensis (Mozley, 1934)
- †Stagnicola scudderi (Cockerell, 1906)
- †Stagnicola subovatus (Zieten, 1832)
- †Stagnicola subpalustris (Thomä, 1845)
- †Stagnicola syrticus (Peyrot, 1933)
- Stagnicola tekecus Glöer & Yıldırım, 2006
- †Stagnicola tokunagai K. Suzuki, 1935
- †Stagnicola tulameenensis L. S. Russell, 1957
- Stagnicola turricula (Held, 1836)
- †Stagnicola undolineata H.-J. Wang & S.-Y. Guo, 1991
- Stagnicola ventricosella (B. Dybowski, 1913)
- †Stagnicola vetustus (Meek, 1860)
- Stagnicola zebrella (B. Dybowski, 1913)

Synonyms

- Stagnicola (Bakerilymnaea) Weyrauch, 1964: synonym of Galba Schrank, 1803
- Stagnicola (Hinkleyia) F. C. Baker, 1928: synonym of Hinkleyia F. C. Baker, 1928
- Stagnicola (Nasonia) F. C. Baker, 1928: synonym of Galba Schrank, 1803
- Stagnicola (Omphiscola) Rafinesque, 1819: synonym of Omphiscola Rafinesque, 1819
- Stagnicola apicina: synonym of Ladislavella apicina
- Stagnicola archangelica: synonym of Stagnicola palustris
- Stagnicola arctica: synonym of Ladislavella arctica
- Stagnicola atra: synonym of Stagnicola palustris
- Stagnicola bonnevillensis: synonym of Ladislavella bonnevillensis
- Stagnicola bulimoides: synonym of Galba bulimoides
- Stagnicola caperata: synonym of Hinkleyia caperata
- Stagnicola catascopium: synonym of Ladislavella catascopium
- Stagnicola contracta: synonym of Ladislavella contracta
- Stagnicola cubensis: synonym of Galba cubensis
- Stagnicola decollata: synonym of Ladislavella catascopium
- Stagnicola elegans: synonym of Lymnaea stagnalis
- Stagnicola elodes: synonym of Ladislavella elodes
- Stagnicola elrodi: synonym of Ladislavella elrodi
- Stagnicola elrodiana: synonym of Ladislavella elrodiana
- Stagnicola emarginata: synonym of Ladislavella emarginata
- Stagnicola exilis: synonym of Ladislavella exilis
- Stagnicola gabbi: synonym of Ladislavella gabbii
- †Stagnicola gracilenta: synonym of †Galba gracilenta
- Stagnicola hemphilli: synonym of Ladislavella elodes
- Stagnicola hinkleyi: synonym of Ladislavella hinkleyi
- Stagnicola idahoense: synonym of Ladislavella idahoensis
- Stagnicola impedita: synonym of Ladislavella elodes
- Stagnicola johnsoni: synonym of Ladislavella traskii
- Stagnicola kennicotti: synonym of Ladislavella kennicotti
- †Stagnicola kingi: synonym of †Polyrhytis kingi
- †Stagnicola laurillardi: synonym of †Stagnicola laurillardianus
- Stagnicola magister: synonym of Ladislavella elodes
- Stagnicola mighelsi: synonym of Ladislavella mighelsi
- Stagnicola minuta: synonym of Galba truncatula
- Stagnicola montanensis: synonym of Walterigalba montanensis
- Stagnicola neopalustris: synonym of Ladislavella neopalustris
- Stagnicola newfoundlandensis: synonym of Ladislavella elodes
- Stagnicola newmarchi: synonym of Ladislavella newmarchi
- Stagnicola octanfracta: synonym of Omphiscola glabra
- Stagnicola petoskeyensis: synonym of Ladislavella petoskeyensi
- Stagnicola pilsbryi: synonym of Hinkleyia pilsbryi
- Stagnicola praebouiletti: synonym of Stagnicola praebouilleti
- Stagnicola reflexa: synonym of Ladislavella elodes
- Stagnicola traskii: synonym of Ladislavella traskii
- Stagnicola umbrosa: synonym of Ladislavella elodes
- Stagnicola utahensis: synonym of Ladislavella utahensis
- Stagnicola vulgaris: synonym of Lymnaea stagnalis
- Stagnicola walkeriana: synonym of Ladislavella walkeriana
- Stagnicola woodruffi: synonym of Ladislavella woodruffi
- Stagnicola yukonensis: synonym of Ladislavella catascopium

Species inquirenda

- Stagnicola tungabhadraensis Ray, 1967

== See also ==
- Catascopia occulta (Jackiewicz, 1959) - synonym: Stagnicola occultus (Jackiewicz, 1959)
