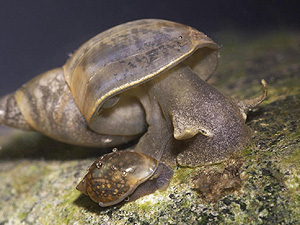
- The large snail is Lymnaea stagnalis

Scientific classification
- Kingdom: Animalia
- Phylum: Mollusca
- Class: Gastropoda
- Superorder: Hygrophila
- Family: Lymnaeidae
- Genus: Lymnaea; Lamarck, 1799

Type species
- Helix stagnalis Linnaeus, 1758

Synonyms
- Limneus Sandberger, 1875 (invalid: unjustified emendation of Lymnaea); Lymnaea (Kazakhlymnaea) Kruglov & Starobogatov, 1984; Lymnaea (Lymnaea) Lamarck, 1799; Lymnaeus (incorrect subsequent spelling)

= Lymnaea =

Lymnaea Temporal range: Paleocene–Recent

Genus of gastropods

Lymnaea is a genus of small to large-sized air-breathing freshwater snails, aquatic pulmonate gastropod mollusks in the subfamily Lymnaeinae of the family Lymnaeidae, the pond snails.

Some species are used in aquaculture under the name Melantho snails.

Numerous Lymnaea species serve as intermediate hosts for trematodes.

Lymnaea is the type genus of the family Lymnaeidae.

== Species ==
Species within the genus Lymnaea include:

- † Lymnaea acuminata Brongniart, 1810
- † Lymnaea acuta Repelin, 1902
- † Lymnaea aequalis Serres, 1818
- † Lymnaea alamosensis Arnold, 1908
- † Lymnaea antiqua Brongniart, 1810
- † Lymnaea aptensis Matheron, 1861
- † Lymnaea ativuncula White, 1886
- † Lymnaea bertschingeri Maillard, 1892
- † Lymnaea bervillii Deshayes, 1863
- † Lymnaea binxianensis Youluo, 1978
- † Lymnaea bogatschevi Vinarski & Frolov, 2017
- † Lymnaea boreliana Noulet, 1857
- † Lymnaea brardi Deshayes, 1863
- † Lymnaea cadurcensis Noulet, 1854
- † Lymnaea caudata F. E. Edwards, 1852
- † Lymnaea cirtana Pallary, 1901
- † Lymnaea compactilis Meek, 1873
- † Lymnaea conica Repelin, 1902
- † Lymnaea consortis White, 1886
- † Lymnaea contracosta Cooper, 1894
- † Lymnaea cosensis Tournouër, 1875
- † Lymnaea crassula Deshayes, 1863
- † Lymnaea cretacea Thomä, 1845
- † Lymnaea dalangshanensis Yü & Zhang, 1982
- † Lymnaea depereti Caziot, 1905
- † Lymnaea diaphana Evans & Shumard, 1856
- † Lymnaea dubrueili Fontannes, 1879
- † Lymnaea fabrei Noulet, 1867
- † Lymnaea filholi Bourguignat in Filhol, 1877
- † Lymnaea filicosta Hanna, 1923
- † Lymnaea fluminicoloides Yen, 1946
- Lymnaea fragilis (Linnaeus, 1758)
- † Lymnaea fusiformis J. Sowerby, 1817
- † Lymnaea gargasensis Matheron in Heer, 1861
- † Lymnaea gracilis (Jooss, 1912)
- † Lymnaea headonensis Newton & G. F. Harris, 1894
- † Lymnaea hennei Dunker, 1846
- † Lymnaea hopii Robinson, 1915
- † Lymnaea jobae (Bourguignat, 1862)
- † Lymnaea kashmiriensis Prashad, 1925
- † Lymnaea klaici Brusina, 1884
- † Lymnaea kuanchuangensis Yen, 1969
- † Lymnaea lawsoni (Hannibal, 1912)
- † Lymnaea limatula Hanna, 1923
- † Lymnaea longissima Matheron, 1843
- † Lymnaea mascallica Cossmann, 1907
- † Lymnaea megarensis Gaudry in Gaudry & Fischer, 1867
- † Lymnaea metochiana Pavlović, 1933
- † Lymnaea milneedwardsiana Bourguignat in Filhol, 1877
- † Lymnaea minuscul White, 1880
- † Lymnaea morrisonensis Yen, 1952
- † Lymnaea munieri Repelin, 1902
- † Lymnaea nebrascensis Evans & Shumard, 1856
- † Lymnaea nitidula (Meek, 1860)
- † Lymnaea nogradensis Csepreghy-Meznerics, 1954
- † Lymnaea obesa Förster, 1892
- † Lymnaea otiformis (Stache in F. Sandberger, 1871)
- † Lymnaea ovum Brongniart, 1810 †* † Lymnaea paotehensis Yen, 1969 †
- † Lymnaea parvula Deshayes, 1863
- † Lymnaea pavlovici Milošević, 1981
- † Lymnaea peregrina Deshayes, 1838
- † Lymnaea permanenta Milošević, 1981
- † Lymnaea physoides de Loriol in de Loriol & Jaccard, 1865
- † Lymnaea procera Förster, 1892
- † Lymnaea pygmaea Serres, 1818
- † Lymnaea raphidia (Bourguignat, 1859)
- † Lymnaea rivalis A. Férussac, 1812
- † Lymnaea rollandi Noulet, 1854
- † Lymnaea sagensis Yen, 1946
- † Lymnaea saportae Matheron, 1861
- † Lymnaea shargainense Popova, 1981
- † Lymnaea sieverti Cockerell, 1906
- † Lymnaea similis Meek, 1860
- Lymnaea stagnalis (Linnaeus, 1758) - great pond snail, type species
- † Lymnaea stojadinovici Milošević, 1981
- † Lymnaea stoppaniana Coppi, 1876
- † Lymnaea striatella Grateloup, 1828
- † Lymnaea subangulata Roffiaen, 1868
- † Lymnaea subfragilis d'Orbigny, 1852
- † Lymnaea succinoides Serres, 1853
- Lymnaea taurica (Clessin, 1880)
  - Lymnaea taurica kazakensis Mozley, 1934
- † Lymnaea tchihatcheffi P. Fischer in Tchihatcheff, 1866
- † Lymnaea tengchieni Kadolsky, 1995
- † Lymnaea tombecki Deshayes, 1863 †
- Lymnaea tomentosa Pfeiffer, 1855
  - Lymnaea tomentosa hamiltoni Dell, 1956
- † Lymnaea truci Schlickum & Strauch, 1979
- † Lymnaea tumere Pierce, 1993
- † Lymnaea turrita Klein, 1853
- † Lymnaea umbilicalis Yen, 1946
- † Lymnaea urceolata A. Braun in Walchner, 1851
- † Lymnaea ventricosa Brongniart, 1810
- † Lymnaea vidali Hermite, 1879
- Lymnaea vulnerata Küster, 1862
- † Lymnaea weberi Pohlig, 1883
- † Lymnaea websteri Arkell, 1941
- † Lymnaea zlatarskii Toula, 1892

Synonyms

- Lymnaea (Stagnicola): synonym of Stagnicola Jeffreys, 1830
- Lymnaea arctica Lea, 1864: synonym of Stagnicola arctica (Lea, 1864)
- Lymnaea aruntalis Cotton & Godfrey, 1938: synonym of Austropeplea tomentosa (L. Pfeiffer, 1855)
- Lymnaea atkaensis Dall, 1884 - frigid lymnaea: synonym of Ladislavella atkaensis (Dall, 1884) (new combination)
- Lymnaea auricularia (Linnaeus, 1758): synonym of Radix auricularia (Linnaeus, 1758)
- Limnaea brevispira Martens, 1897: synonym of Bullastra brevispira (Martens, 1897)
- Lymnaea bulimoides Lea, 1841: synonym of Sphaerogalba bulimoides (Lea, 1841)
- Lymnaea bulla Kobelt, 1881: synonym of Cerasina bulla (Kobelt, 1881)
- Lymnaea cailliaudi (Bourguignat, 1883): synonym of Radix natalensis (F. Krauss, 1848) (junior synonym)
- Lymnaea catascopium Say, 1817: synonym of Ladislavella catascopium (Say, 1817)
- Lymnaea chereshnevi Kruglov & Starobogatov, 1989 : synonym of Radix chereshnevi (Kruglov & Starobogatov, 1989)
- Lymnaea columella: synonym of Pseudosuccinea columella
- Lymnaea cousini: synonym of Galba cousini
- Lymnaea cubensis is a synonyms of Galba cubensis
- Lymnaea diaphana King [in King & Broderip], 1832: synonym of Pectinidens diaphanus (King [in King & Broderip], 1832)
- Lymnaea elodes Say, 1821: synonym of Ladislavella elodes (Say, 1821)
- Lymnaea emarginata Say, 1821: synonym of Ladislavella emarginata (Say, 1821)
- Lymnaea fusca (C. Pfeiffer, 1821): synonym of Stagnicola fuscus (C. Pfeiffer, 1821
- Lymnaea gebleri Middendorff, 1851: synonym of Radix gebleri (Middendorff, 1851)
- Lymnaea gracilis Jay, 1839: synonym of Acella haldemani (Binney, 1867)
- Lymnaea hadutkae Kruglov & Starobogatov, 1989: synonym of Radix auricularia (Linnaeus, 1758)
- Lymnaea haldemani Binney, 1867: synonym of Acella haldemani (Binney, 1867)
- Lymnaea heptapotamica Lazareva, 1967: synonym of Orientogalba hookeri (Reeve, 1850)
- Lymnaea hookeri Reeve, 1850: synonym of Orientogalba hookeri (Reeve, 1850)
- Lymnaea involuta Thompson, 1840: synonym of Myxas glutinosa (O. F. Müller, 1774)
- Lymnaea luteola: synonym of Radix luteola
- Lymnaea magadanensis Kruglov & Starobogatov, 1985: synonym of Pacifimyxas magadanensis (Kruglov & Starobogatov, 1985)
- Lymnaea megasoma Say, 1824: synonym of Bulimnea megasoma (Say, 1824)
- Lymnaea meridensis Bargues, Artigas & Mas-Coma, 2011: synonym of Galba meridensis (Bargues, Artigas, Khoubbane & Mas-Coma, 2011)
- Lymnaea natalensis: synonym of Radix natalensis
- Lymnaea neotropica Bargues et al., 2007: synonym of Galba neotropica
- Lymnaea oahouensis Souleyet, 1852: synonym of Pseudisidora rubella (I. Lea, 1841)
- Lymnaea ovata: synonym of Radix balthica (Linnaeus, 1758)
  - Lymnaea ovata var. amnicola Westerlund, 1890: synonym of Radix balthica (Linnaeus, 1758)
- Lymnaea palustris (O. F. Müller, 1774): synonym of Stagnicola palustris (O. F. Müller, 1774)
- Lymnaea parva I. Lea, 1841: synonym of Fossaria parva (I. Lea, 1841)
- Lymnaea peculiaris Hubendick, 1951: synonym of Limnobulla peculiaris (Hubendick, 1951)
- Lymnaea peregra (O. F. Müller, 1774): synonym of Radix peregra (O. F. Müller, 1774) - wandering snail
- Lymnaea producta (Mighels, 1845): synonym of Pseudisidora producta (Mighels, 1845)
- Lymnaea rubella Lea, 1841: synonym of Pseudisidora rubella (Lea, 1841)
- Lymnaea rubiginosa Michelin, 1831: synonym of Radix rubiginosa (Michelin, 1831)
- Lymnaea rufescens Gray, 1822: synonym of Radix rufescens (Gray, 1822)
- Lymnaea schelechovi Kruglov & Starobogatov, 1989: synonym of Radix schelechovi (Kruglov & Starobogatov, 1989)
- Lymnaea thermokamtschatica Kruglov & Starobogatov, 1989: synonym of Radix auricularia (Linnaeus, 1758)
- Lymnaea truncatula (O. F. Müller, 1774): synonym of Galba truncatula (O. F. Müller, 1774)
- Lymnaea vahlii Möller, 1842: synonym of Walhiana vahlii (Möller, 1842)
- Limnaea viatrix: synonym of Galba viatrix
- † Lymnaea (Galba) kreutzii var. subfusca Łomnicki, 1886 : synonym of † Stagnicola kreutzii (Łomnicki, 1886)
- Limneus kamtschaticus Middendorff, 1851 : synonym of Radix kamtschatica (Middendorff, 1851)
- Limneus minutus Draparnaud, 1805 : synonym of Galba truncatula (O. F. Müller, 1774)
- Limneus ovatus Draparnaud, 1805 : synonym of Radix balthica (Linnaeus, 1758)
- Limneus parchappii d'Orbigny, 1835 : synonym of Chilina parchappii (d'Orbigny, 1835)
- Limnaeus amygdalum Troschel, 1837: synonym of Radix rufescens (Gray, 1822)
