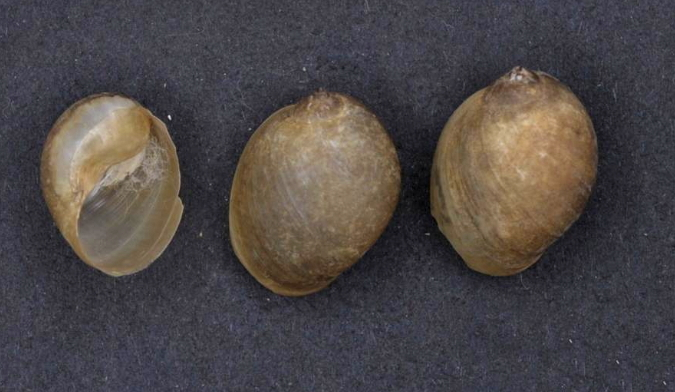
- Shell of Bullastra lessoni (specimen at Naturalis Biodiversity Center)

Scientific classification
- Kingdom: Animalia
- Phylum: Mollusca
- Class: Gastropoda
- Superorder: Hygrophila
- Family: Lymnaeidae
- Genus: Bullastra
- Species: B. lessoni

Binomial name
- Bullastra lessoni Deshayes, 1831

Synonyms
- Amphipeplea iuvoluta Schmeltz, 1869; Amphipeplea melbournensis L.Pfeiffer, 1856; Amphipeplea strangei L.Pfeiffer, 1854; Austropeplea lessoni (Deshayes, 1831); Limnaea affinis Küster, 1862; Limnaea cumingii G.B.Sowerby II, 1872; Limnaea lessoni Deshayes, 1830; Limnaea perlevis Conrad, 1850; Limnaea spirulata G.B.Sowerby II, 1872; Limnaeus affinis Küster, 1862; Limnea lessoni Deshayes, 1831; Lymnaea lessoni Deshayes, 1831; Lymnea perlevis Conrad, 1850; Peplimnea lessoni (Deshayes, 1830); Peplimnea lessoni subsp. thema Iredale, 1944; Peplimnea opima Iredale, 1944; Peplimnea spiriger Iredale, 1944

= Bullastra lessoni =

southern bubble pond snail

Species of freshwater snail

Bullastra lessoni, the southern bubble pond snail, is a species of gastropod belonging to the family Lymnaeidae.

== Description ==
The length of the shell attains 27 mm, its diameter 20 mm.

(Original description) The shell has an ovate-ventricose shape. It is globose, translucent, exceedingly fragile, somewhat striated, greenish.The spire is short and acute. The large aperture is oval. The outer lip is simple and acute. The columella is twisted.

== Distribution ==
It is found in Australia amongst aquatic plants in slow flowing rivers, ponds, dams and billabongs. A globose, thin shelled snail, sometimes seeing floating foot-uppermost on the surface of freshwater. Its food is algae and detritus.
