= Acella =

Scientific classification
- Kingdom: Animalia
- Phylum: Mollusca
- Class: Gastropoda
- Superorder: Hygrophila
- Family: Lymnaeidae
- Genus: Acella; Haldeman, 1841

Genus of snails

Acella is a genus of gastropods belonging to the family Lymnaeidae.

The species of this genus are found in Eurasia and Northern America.

Species:

- Acella gracillima (Bittner, 1884)
- Acella haldemani (Deshayes, 1867)
- Acella lixianensis Zhu, 1985
- Acella sibirica Bogachev, 1924
- Acella subsimilis Stache, 1889
- Acella suptilis (Pavlović, 1931)
- Acella transsilvanica (L.Roth, 1881)
