= Galba humilis =

Scientific classification
- Kingdom: Animalia
- Phylum: Mollusca
- Class: Gastropoda
- Superorder: Hygrophila
- Family: Lymnaeidae
- Genus: Galba
- Species: G. humilis

Binomial name
- Galba humilis (Say, 1822)

Species of gastropod

Galba humilis is a species of gastropods belonging to the family Lymnaeidae.

The species is found in Northern America.
