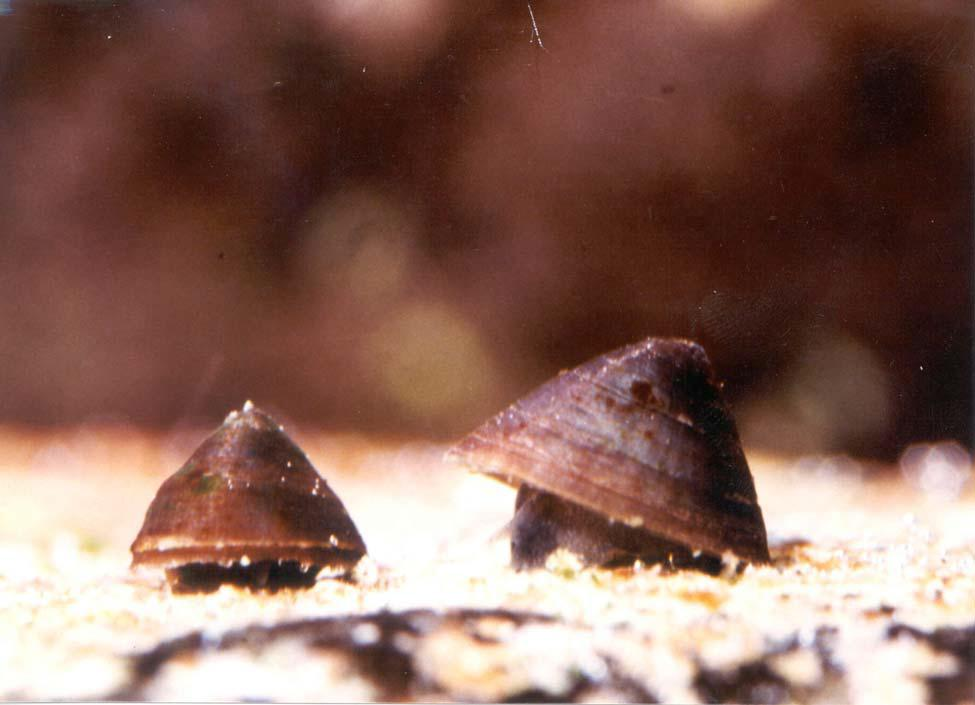
- Two active individuals of the Banbury Springs limpet. The one on the right is grazing.

Conservation status
- Critically Imperiled (NatureServe)

- Endangered (ESA)

Scientific classification
- Kingdom: Animalia
- Phylum: Mollusca
- Class: Gastropoda
- Superorder: Hygrophila
- Family: Lymnaeidae
- Subfamily: Lancinae
- Genus: Idaholanx; Clark, Campbell & Lydeard, 2017
- Species: I. fresti

Binomial name
- Idaholanx fresti Clark, Campbell & Lydeard, 2017

= Idaholanx =

Species of gastropod

Idaholanx fresti, the Banbury Springs limpet or Banbury Springs lanx, is a rare species of freshwater snail, an aquatic gastropod mollusc in the family Lymnaeidae. It is the only species in the genus Idaholanx. First discovered in 1988, the species was formally described and named in 2017.

== Distribution ==
This freshwater limpet is endemic to the US State of Idaho, where it is known from a 10-kilometer stretch of the Snake River. It is found in four complexes of springs along the Snake River in south-central Idaho: Thousand Springs, Box Canyon Springs, Banbury Hot Springs, and Briggs Springs.

== Description ==
This snail is cinnamon red in color. The shell is conical in shape. It is up to 7.1 millimeters long by 6 wide and up to 4.3 millimeters tall.

This snail is similar in its morphology to species in the genus Lanx, but genetic analysis reveals that it is genetically more similar to the genus Fisherola.

== Habitat ==
Idaholanx fresti lives in fast flowing, clean, cold water springs. It needs highly oxygenated water.

== Conservation ==
In 1992 it was federally listed as an endangered species of the United States. This species is endemic to Idaho. It only exists at four places: Thousand Springs, Box Canyon Springs, Briggs Springs and Banbury Springs. It is threatened by habitat modification, spring flow reduction, groundwater quality, and invasive species.

== Diet ==
Dead plants and diatoms.
