= Lantzia =

Lantzia carinata

Conservation status
- Critically endangered, possibly extinct (IUCN 3.1)

Scientific classification
- Kingdom: Animalia
- Phylum: Mollusca
- Class: Gastropoda
- Superorder: Hygrophila
- Family: Lymnaeidae
- Genus: Lantzia; Jousseaume, 1872
- Species: L. carinata

Binomial name
- Lantzia carinata Jousseaume, 1872

Species of gastropod

Lantzia is a genus of amphibious pulmonate gastropods in the family Lymnaeidae. It is monotypic, being represented by the single species Lantzia carinata. It is endemic to montane streams on the Indian Ocean island of Réunion.

== Habitat and ecology ==
Lantzia carinata is a small, limpet-like lymnaeid endemic to mountain streams and waterfalls at an altitude of 1200–1300 meters asl on the island of Réunion, where it clings to mosses and stones- similarly to the Hawaiian Erinna species. Despite a similarity in habitat choice and morphology, this is assumed to be a case of convergence rather than one originating from evolutionary radiation (although this genus has occasionally been synonymized with Erinna).

== Threats ==
Lantzia carinata, despite being rediscovered in 1992, continues to occur in an extremely limited area, also possessing an extremely vulnerable and specialized habitat within native mosses. Threats posed by declines in habitat quality as a result of invasive species have caused the species to, under IUCN criteria B2ab(iii), be assessed as Critically Endangered. In addition, a lack of recorded occurrences in modern endemic malacofaunal surveys has presented the caveat 'Possibly Extinct' to this species' status. Along with Madagasikara zazavavindrano and Pisidium betafoense, this species is one of the only three Critically Endangered freshwater mollusk species recorded from the Madagascar and the Indian Ocean islands hotspot.
