= Bullastra =

Scientific classification
- Kingdom: Animalia
- Phylum: Mollusca
- Class: Gastropoda
- Superorder: Hygrophila
- Family: Lymnaeidae
- Genus: Bullastra; Bergh, 1901

Genus of gastropods

Bullastra is a genus of large-sized, globose snails in the family Lymnaeidae. Snails in this genus have large apertures and fleshy, triangular tentacles. This genus is similar to Austropeplea but differs in generally being larger and having a distinctive twist in the columella.

== Distribution and habitat ==
Bullastra are found in the Philippines and on mainland Australia. They are fully aquatic, living in smaller bodies of water, such as ponds and streams.

== Species ==
The genus Bullastra contains the following 4 species:

- Bullastra brevispira (Martens, 1897)
- Bullastra cumingiana (Pfeiffer, 1855)
- Bullastra vinosa (Adams and Angas, 1864)
- Bullastra lessoni (Deshayes, 1830)

Type species: Bullastra velutinoides Bergh, 1901 (=Bullastra cumingiana (Pfeiffer, 1855))
