= Bulimnea =

Scientific classification
- Domain: Eukaryota
- Kingdom: Animalia
- Phylum: Mollusca
- Class: Gastropoda
- Superorder: Hygrophila
- Family: Lymnaeidae
- Genus: Bulimnea; Haldeman, 1841

Genus of freshwater snails

Bulimnea is a genus of gastropods belonging to the family Lymnaeidae.

The species of this genus are found in Northern America.

Species:

- Bulimnea megasoma (Say, 1824)
- Bulimnea petaluma (Hanna, 1923)
- Bulimnea webbi Firby, 1966
