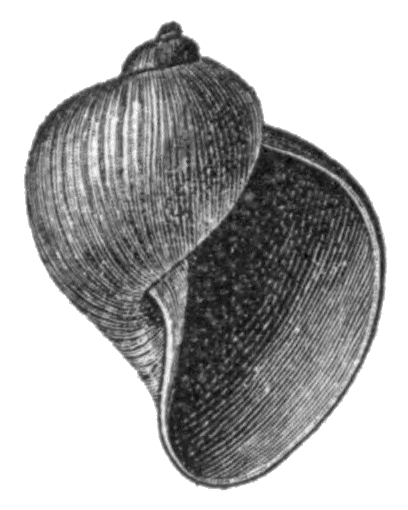
- Drawing of apertural view of the shell of Ladislavella utahensis.

Conservation status
- Critically endangered, possibly extinct (IUCN 3.1)

- Presumed Extinct (NatureServe)

Scientific classification
- Kingdom: Animalia
- Phylum: Mollusca
- Class: Gastropoda
- Superorder: Hygrophila
- Family: Lymnaeidae
- Genus: Ladislavella
- Species: L. utahensis

Binomial name
- Ladislavella utahensis (Call, 1884)

Synonyms
- Radix ampla var. utahensis Call, 1884; Radix utahensis (Call, 1884); Galba utahensis (Call, 1884); Polyrhytis utahensis (Call, 1884); Stagnicola utahensis (Call, 1884)

= Thickshell pondsnail =

Species of gastropod

Ladislavella utahensis, common name the thickshell pondsnail, is a species of air-breathing freshwater snail, an aquatic pulmonate gastropod mollusc in the family Lymnaeidae, the pond snails. This species is endemic to Utah Lake in the United States. The last living snails were found in the early 1930s.

== Shell description ==
The shell is globose, somewhat umbilicated and irregularly costate. The color of the shell is light horn and nearly pellucid. The spire is rather small and conical. The shell has from 4 to 4 and half convex whorls, that are somewhat flattened above, giving rather a shouldered appearance to the whorls. Whorls are rapidly increasing in size. The last whorl is inflated, with numerous rather marked transverse costae and minutely wrinkled. The suture is somewhat deep, regularly impressed.

The aperture is elongately ovate, effuse, approaching patulous and pearly white within. The outer lip is simple and its margin is connected by a slight calcareous deposit. The columella is somewhat twisted, but straight in front.

The average width of the shell of Ladislavella utahensis is 7.10 mm. The average height of the shell is 13.40 mm. The maximum width of the shell is 8.88 mm. The height of the shell is 16.82 mm. The width of the aperture is 5.90 mm. The height of the apeture is 9.00 mm.

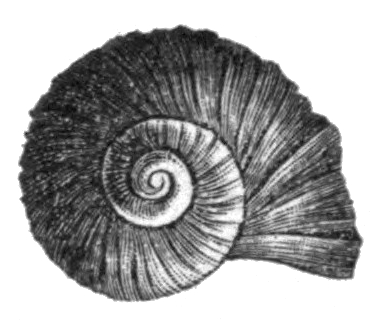
Drawing of apical view of the shell

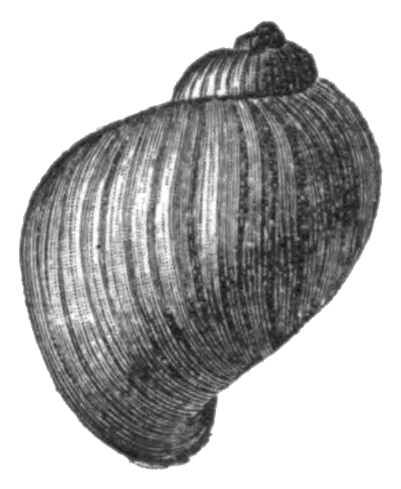
Drawing of lateral view of the shell

== Anatomy ==
The anatomy of the radula was not published. (cf.)

== Distribution ==
This species is endemic to Utah and it is known only from Utah Lake. The type locality is Lake Utah, Lehi, Utah.

The species was already considered "rare" in Utah Lake in the 1880s.

The most recent living examples were found in 1933.

== Ecology ==
This species was associated with abundant individuals of the snails Valvata utahensis and Fluminicola fusca and with the bivalve Sphaerium dentatum.
