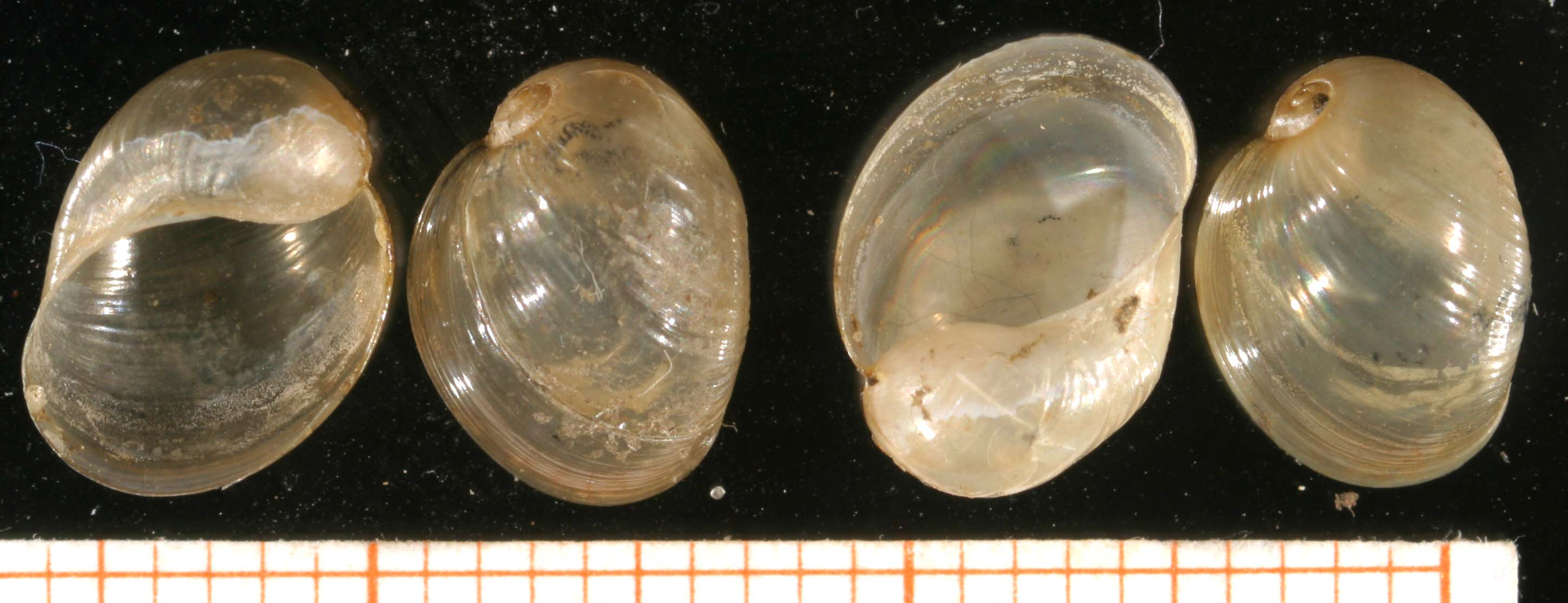
- Shells of Myxas glutinosa

Scientific classification
- Kingdom: Animalia
- Phylum: Mollusca
- Class: Gastropoda
- Superorder: Hygrophila
- Family: Lymnaeidae
- Genus: Myxas (G. B. Sowerby I, 1822)

Species
- See text

= Myxas =

Genus of gastropods

Myxas is a genus of small air-breathing freshwater snails, aquatic gastropod mollusks in the family Lymnaeidae, the pond snails.

== Distribution ==
This genus is European.

== Species ==
Species within this genus include:

- Myxas glutinosa (O. F. Müller, 1774) - type species
