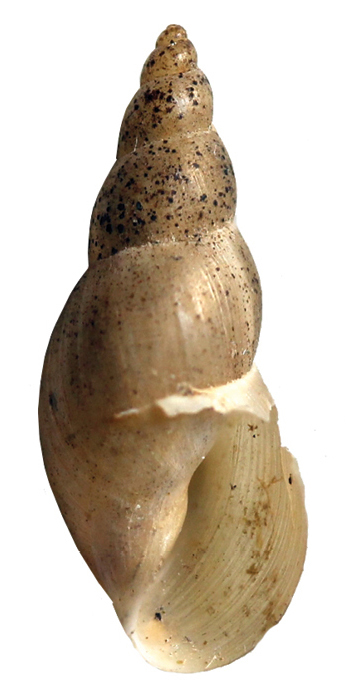
- Ladislavella elodes

Scientific classification
- Domain: Eukaryota
- Kingdom: Animalia
- Phylum: Mollusca
- Class: Gastropoda
- Superorder: Hygrophila
- Family: Lymnaeidae
- Subfamily: Lymnaeinae
- Genus: Ladislavella; Dybowski, 1913

= Ladislavella =

Genus of pond snails

Ladislavella is a genus of gastropods belonging to the family Lymnaeidae.

The species of this genus are found in Eurasia and America.

Species:

- Ladislavella apicina (I.Lea, 1838)
- Ladislavella arctica (I.Lea, 1864)
- Ladislavella atkaensis (Dall, 1884)
- Ladislavella bonnevillensis (Call, 1884)
- Ladislavella catascopium (Say, 1817)
- Ladislavella contracta (Currier, 1868)
- Ladislavella elodes (Say, 1821)
- Ladislavella elrodi (F.C.Baker & Henderson, 1933)
- Ladislavella elrodiana (F.C.Baker, 1935)
- Ladislavella emarginata (Say, 1821)
- Ladislavella exilis (I.Lea, 1834)
- Ladislavella gabbii (Tryon, 1865)
- Ladislavella hinkleyi (F.C.Baker, 1906)
- Ladislavella idahoensis (Henderson, 1931)
- Ladislavella kennicotti (F.C.Baker, 1933)
- Ladislavella liogyra (Westerlund, 1897)
- Ladislavella meekiana (Meek, 1876)
- Ladislavella mighelsi (Binney, 1865)
- Ladislavella neopalustris (F.C.Baker, 1911)
- Ladislavella newmarchi (Russell, 1952)
- Ladislavella occulta (Jackiewicz, 1959)
- Ladislavella oronoensis (F.C.Baker, 1904)
- Ladislavella petoskeyensis (B.Walker, 1908)
- Ladislavella shumardi (Meek, 1876)
- Ladislavella terebra (Westerlund, 1885)
- Ladislavella traskii (Tryon, 1863)
- Ladislavella utahensis (Call, 1884)
- Ladislavella walkeriana (F.C.Baker, 1926)
- Ladislavella woodruffi (F.C.Baker, 1901)
