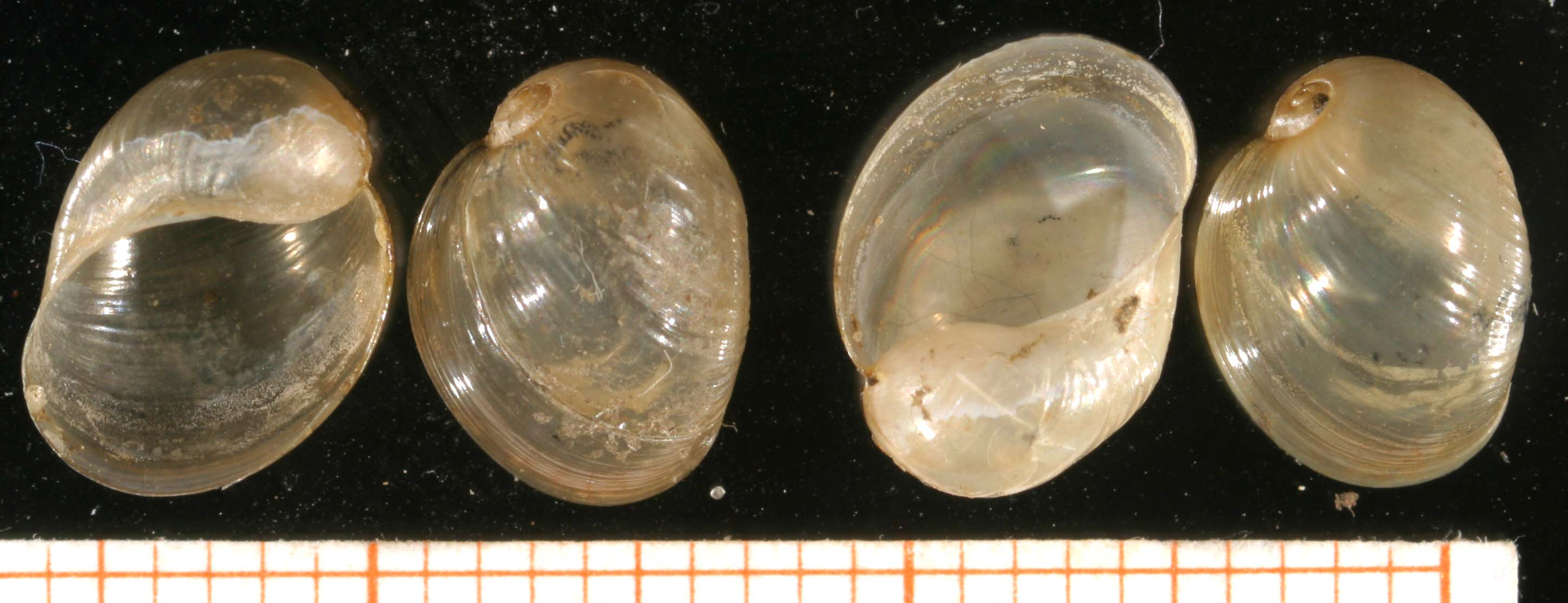
- Four shells of Myxas glutinosa, scale bar in cm & mm

Conservation status
- Data Deficient (IUCN 2.3)

Scientific classification
- Kingdom: Animalia
- Phylum: Mollusca
- Class: Gastropoda
- Superorder: Hygrophila
- Family: Lymnaeidae
- Genus: Myxas
- Species: M. glutinosa

Binomial name
- Myxas glutinosa (O. F. Müller, 1774)

= Myxas glutinosa =

Species of gastropod

Myxas glutinosa (glutinous snail) is a species of small air-breathing freshwater snail, an aquatic gastropod mollusc in the family Lymnaeidae, the pond snails.

== Anatomy ==
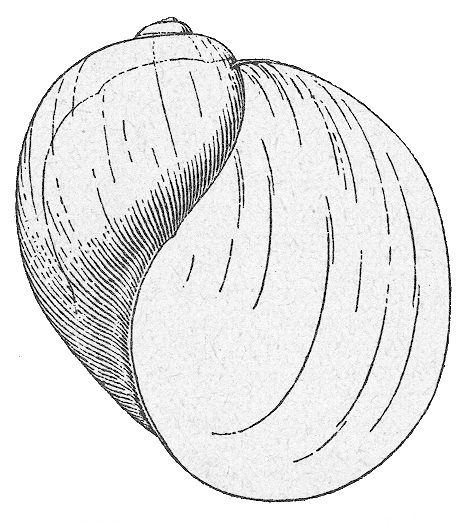
drawing of apertural view of the shell of Myxas glutinosa

This snail is unusual in that it extends its almost transparent mantle to completely cover the shell when it is in motion, giving the very small animal a glass-like appearance. It also makes the animal sticky to the touch, hence its common name.

== Shell description ==
The shell is 13 to 16 mm in height and 11 mm to 15 mm in width in the adult. The upper whorls are almost flat so that the shell has a short blunt spire, the last whorl is inflated and predominating. The aperture is more than 90% of the shell height. The umbilicus is closed. The shell colour is brown or green, extremely thin and very transparent and shiny.

== Distribution ==
This species is European: it is now rare in western Europe, and even rarer in eastern Europe.

- British Isles - listed in List of endangered species in the British Isles
  - This species is fully protected in the United Kingdom under the Wildlife and Countryside Act 1981 since 1981.
  - Great Britain - in one locality in Wales
  - Ireland - extinct in Northern Ireland, still common in the Royal Canal and Grand Canal in central Ireland
- Czech Republic - extinct in Bohemia
- Germany - critically endangered (vom Aussterben bedroht)
- Netherlands
- Poland

According to the IUCN red list it is also native to Austria, Belarus, Belgium, Estonia, Finland, Germany, Kazakhstan, Latvia, Lithuania, Moldova, Norway, Russian Federation, Sweden and Ukraine.

== Habitat ==
This species requires pollution-free, extremely clear, calm water, in calcium-rich canals, streams and lakes.

It is rapidly declining or already extinct in many European countries, because of the loss of good habitat. Since 2014 there has been a captive breeding programme in Wales to build up knowledge about the species' habitat requirements as well as numbers, with the aim to release snails back into suitable locations. In 2026 several members of the British and Irish Association of Zoos and Aquariums joined the programme.
