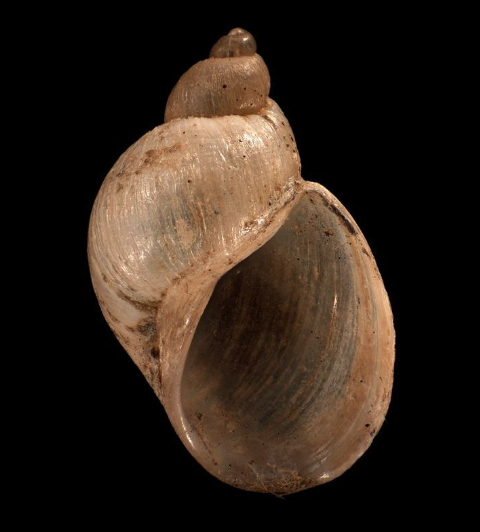
- Shell of Austropeplea tomentosa (specimen at the Museum of New Zealand Te Papa Tongarewa)

Conservation status
- Data Deficit (NZ TCS)

Scientific classification
- Kingdom: Animalia
- Phylum: Mollusca
- Class: Gastropoda
- Superorder: Hygrophila
- Family: Lymnaeidae
- Genus: Austropeplea
- Species: A. tomentosa

Binomial name
- Austropeplea tomentosa (L. Pfeiffer, 1855)

Synonyms
- Amphipeplea ampulla (F. W. Hutton, 1884) (junior subjective synonym); Amphipeplea ampulla var. globosa Suter, 1891 (junior subjective synonym); Austropeplea (Austropeplea) tomentosa (L. Pfeiffer, 1855) · alternative representation (superseded combination); Limnaea (Amphipeplea) ampulla F. W. Hutton, 1884 (junior subjective synonym); Limnaea (Amphipeplea) arguta F. W. Hutton, 1884 (junior subjective synonym); Limnaea ampulla F. W. Hutton, 1884 (junior subjective synonym); Limnaea leptosoma F. W. Hutton, 1884 (junior subjective synonym); † Lymnaea subscalariformis Suter, 1917 (junior subjective synonym); Lymnaea tomentosa (L. Pfeiffer, 1855) (superseded combination); † Lymnoea subscalariformis Suter, 1917 (superseded combination); † Myxas ampulla (F. W. Hutton, 1884) junior subjective synonym; † Myxas ampulla waikariensis Cumber, 1941 junior subjective synonym; Succinea tomentosa L. Pfeiffer, 1855 superseded combination

= Austropeplea tomentosa =

Species of gastropod

Austropeplea tomentosa, commonly known as the New Zealand fluke pond snail, is a species of air-breathing freshwater snail in the family Lymnaeidae.

Subspecies

- Austropeplea tomentosa hamiltoni (Dell, 1956)
- Austropeplea tomentosa tomentosa (L. Pfeiffer, 1855)

The species was thought to be widely distributed across Australia and New Zealand. However, molecular research published in 2009 suggests that A. tomentosa is endemic to New Zealand, while Australian populations previously assigned to this species are distinct taxa, such as Austropeplea brazieri.

== Description ==
The length of the shell attains 13 mm, its diameter 9 mm.

(Original description in Latin) The shell is oblong-conical in shape and thin in substance. It is covered in a fine, short-haired down (tomentose), which gives it a dull, non-shining appearance. The material is translucent and displays a pale horn-colored hue.

The spire is conical and terminates in a sharp apex. There are three whorls in total: the second whorl is convex, while the body whorl is quite large, forming three-quarters of the total length and becoming narrower at the base. The columella appears slightly thickened with a callus; it is very lightly folded and follows a curved, arcuate path.

The aperture is slightly oblique and takes an acuminated-oval shape, appearing somewhat leaned over. Finally, the peristome (the lip of the aperture) is simple and slightly flared outward.

== Ecology and Distribution ==
The species is found throughout the North and South Islands of New Zealand. It typically inhabits slow-moving or standing waters, including swamps, ponds, and the edges of streams. It is semi-amphibious and can often be found on damp mud or trailing aquatic vegetation near the water's surface.

== Parasitology ==
A. tomentosa is a significant intermediate host for the liver fluke (Fasciola hepatica). Because it acts as a vector for this parasite, it has caused concern in agricultural areas where it can facilitate the infection of sheep and cattle.
