= Galba viatrix =

Scientific classification
- Kingdom: Animalia
- Phylum: Mollusca
- Class: Gastropoda
- Superorder: Hygrophila
- Family: Lymnaeidae
- Genus: Galba
- Species: G. viatrix

Binomial name
- Galba viatrix (d'Orbigny, 1835)

Synonyms
- Lymnaea viatrix d'Orbigny, 1835

Species of gastropod

Galba viatrix is a species of air-breathing freshwater snail, an aquatic pulmonate gastropod mollusk in the family Lymnaeidae, the pond snails.
