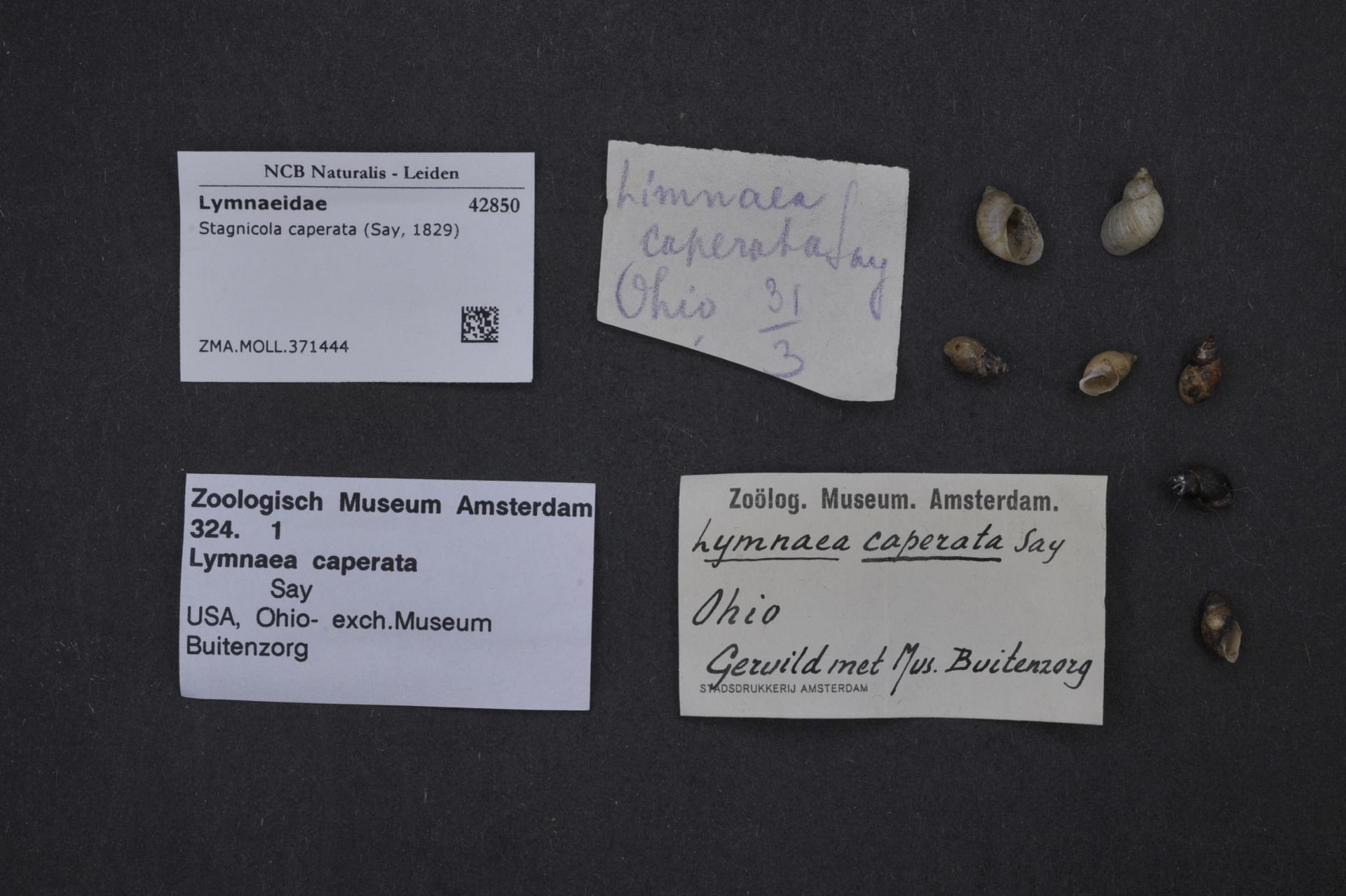

Conservation status
- Least Concern (IUCN 3.1)

- Secure (NatureServe)

Scientific classification
- Kingdom: Animalia
- Phylum: Mollusca
- Class: Gastropoda
- Superorder: Hygrophila
- Family: Lymnaeidae
- Genus: Hinkleyia
- Species: H. caperata

Binomial name
- Hinkleyia caperata (Say, 1829)

Synonyms
- Galba caperata (Say, 1829); Limnaea caperata Say, 1829; Limnaea caperata var. umbilicata Adams, 1840; Limnaea ferrissi Baker, 1902; Limnaeus caperatus Say, 1829; Limnophysa caperata (Say, 1829); Limnophysa smithsoniana (Lea, 1864); Lymnaea caperata Say, 1829; Lymnaea smithsoniana Lea, 1864; Lymnaeus caperatus Say, 1829; Lymneus caperatus Say, 1829; Stagnicola (Hinkleyia) caperata (Say, 1829); Stagnicola caperata (Say, 1829)

= Hinkleyia caperata =

Species of freshwater snail native to North America

Hinkleyia caperata, commonly known as the wrinkled marshsnail, is a species of freshwater snail in the family Lymnaeidae. It is native to North America.
