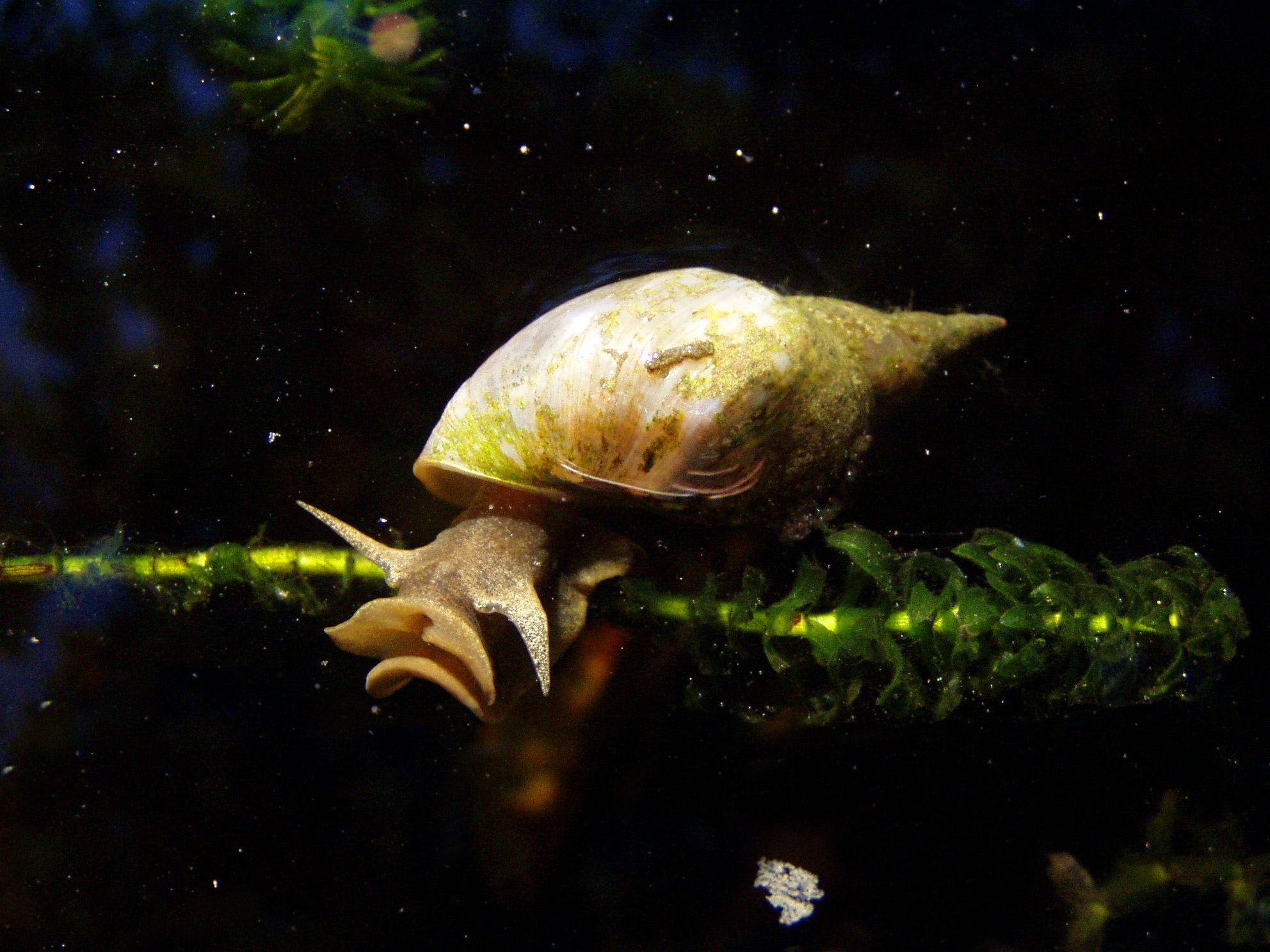

Conservation status
- Least Concern (IUCN 3.1)

- Secure (NatureServe)

Scientific classification
- Kingdom: Animalia
- Phylum: Mollusca
- Class: Gastropoda
- Superorder: Hygrophila
- Family: Lymnaeidae
- Genus: Lymnaea
- Species: L. stagnalis

Binomial name
- Lymnaea stagnalis (Linnaeus, 1758)

= Lymnaea stagnalis =

Great pond snail Lymnaea stagnalis

Species of gastropod

Lymnaea stagnalis, better known as the great pond snail, is a species of large air-breathing freshwater snail, an aquatic pulmonate gastropod mollusk in the family Lymnaeidae. The great pond snail is a model organism to study parasitology, neurology, embryonal development and genetic regulation.

Limnaea stagnalis var. baltica Lindström, 1868: synonym of Lymnaea stagnalis (Linnaeus, 1758)

== Distribution ==
The distribution of this species is holarctic, mainly the temperate zones of Northern America, Europe and Asia. The snail can be found in many ponds, lakes and very slow-moving rivers with a rich underwater vegetation. The northernmost populations exist in northern Norway, and in Central Europe, it inhabits even montane ecosystems at 1700 meters above sea level. In the Saprobic system used in Germany to judge the quality of freshwater biotopes, the species has a value of 1.9 and indicates a biotope with a water quality class II, the second-highest.

== Shell ==
For the terms used in this section, see gastropod shell. The shells vary from light brown to dark brown, and the height of an adult shell ranges from 45 to 60 millimeters. Rarely, snails with a 70 mm shell can be found. The width of an adult shell ranges from 20 to 30 mm.

The shell has 4.5 to 6 weakly convex whorls. The upper whorls are pointed, while the last whorl is suddenly inflated. Young great pond snails can be confused with those of the genus Physa, and rarely, in cases of irregularly grown shells, with Radix peregra—though adults of the latter species are a lot smaller, with shell heights of only 12 to 20 millimeters.

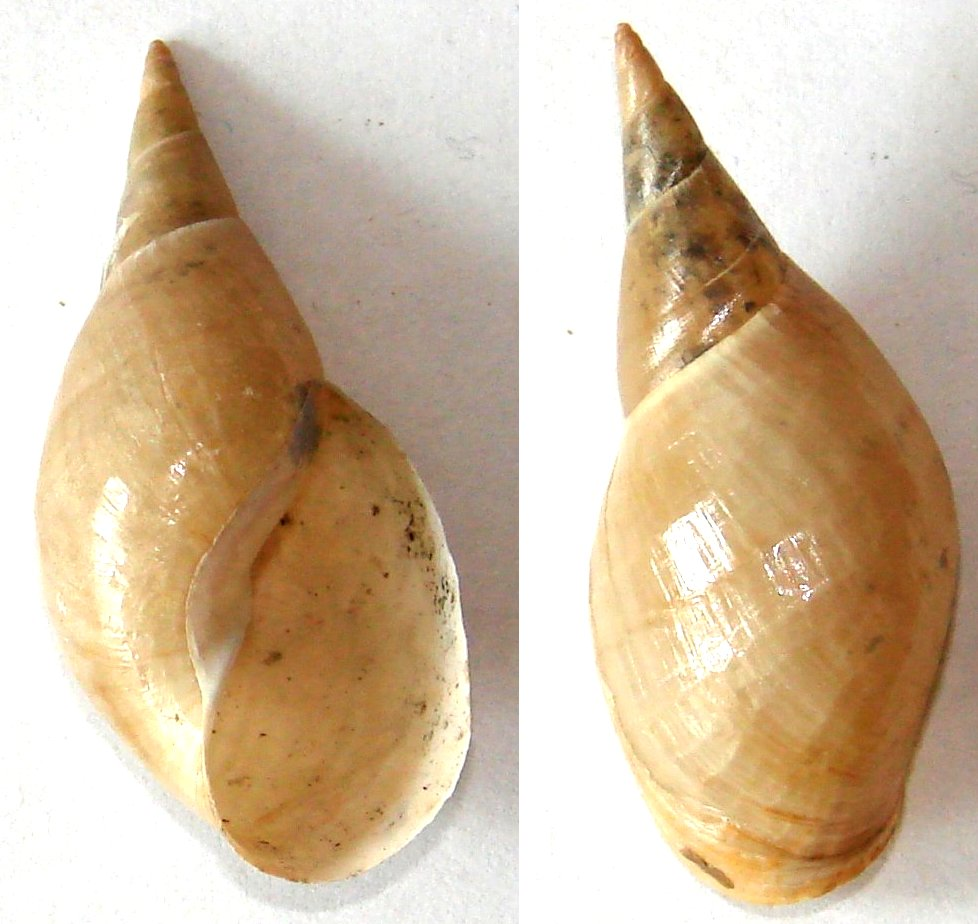
Typical shell

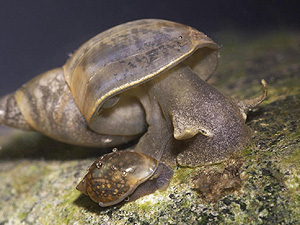
Great pond snail with an adult Physa sp. snail

== Nervous system ==
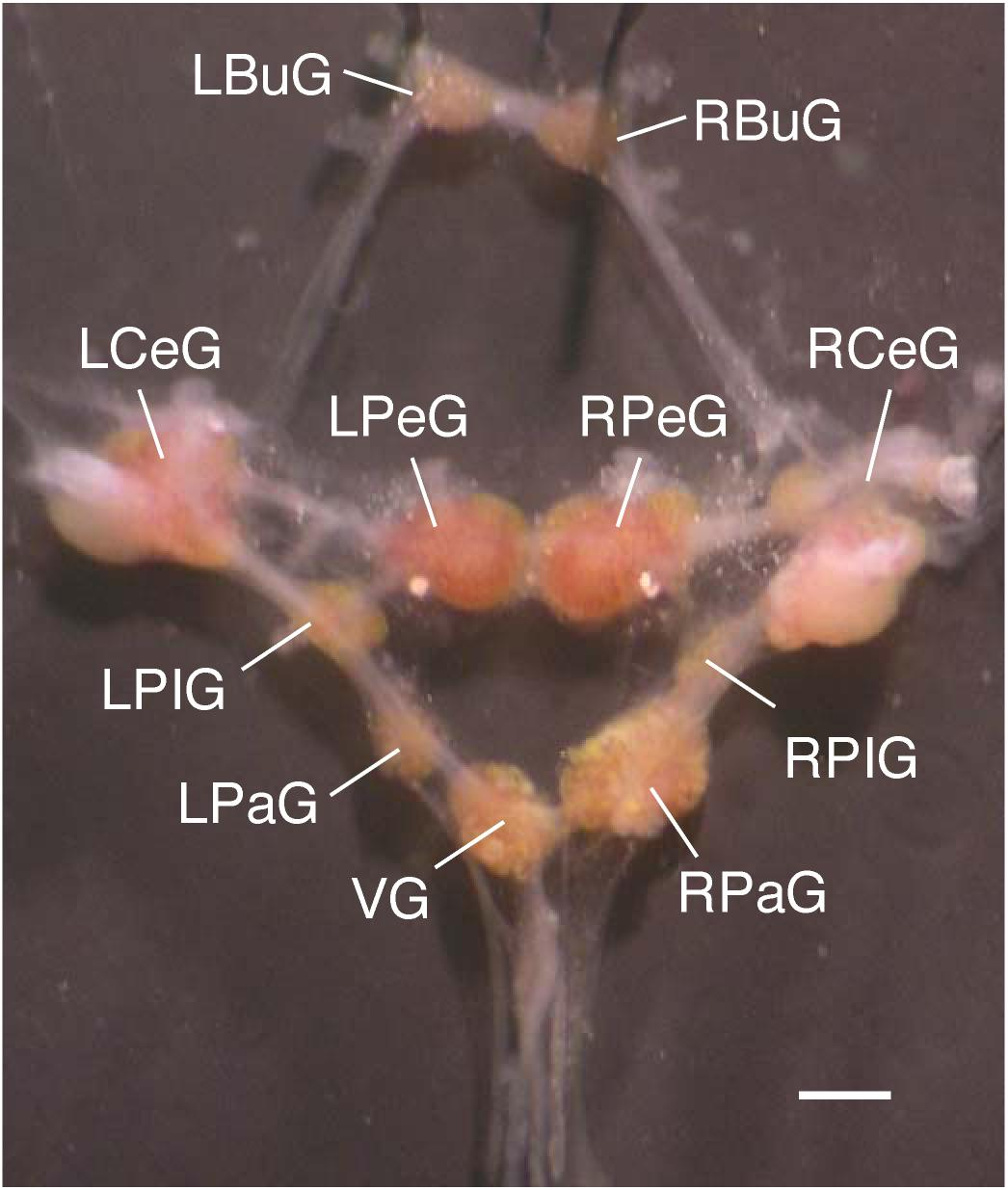
The dissected central ring ganglia of Lymnaea stagnalis. Scale bar is 1 mm. LBuG and RBuG: left and right buccal ganglia LCeG and RCeG: left and right cerebral ganglia LPeG and RPeG: left and right pedal ganglia LPIG and RPIG: left and right pleural ganglia LPaG and RPaG: left and right parietal ganglia VG: visceral ganglion.

Lymnaea stagnalis is widely used for the study of learning, memory and neurobiology.

Lymnaea stagnalis has a relatively simple central nervous system (CNS) consisting of a total of ~20,000 neurons, many of them individually identifiable, organized in a ring of interconnected ganglia. Most neurons of the Lymnaea stagnalis central nervous system are large in size (diameter: up to ~100 μm), thus allowing electrophysiological dissection of neuronal networks that has yielded profound insights in the working mechanisms of neuronal networks controlling relatively simple behaviors such as feeding, respiration, locomotion, and reproduction. Studies using the central nervous system of Lymnaea stagnalis as a model organism have also identified novel cellular and molecular mechanisms in neuronal regeneration, synapse formation, synaptic plasticity, learning and memory formation, the neurobiology of development and aging, the modulatory role of neuropeptides, and adaptive responses to hypoxic stress.

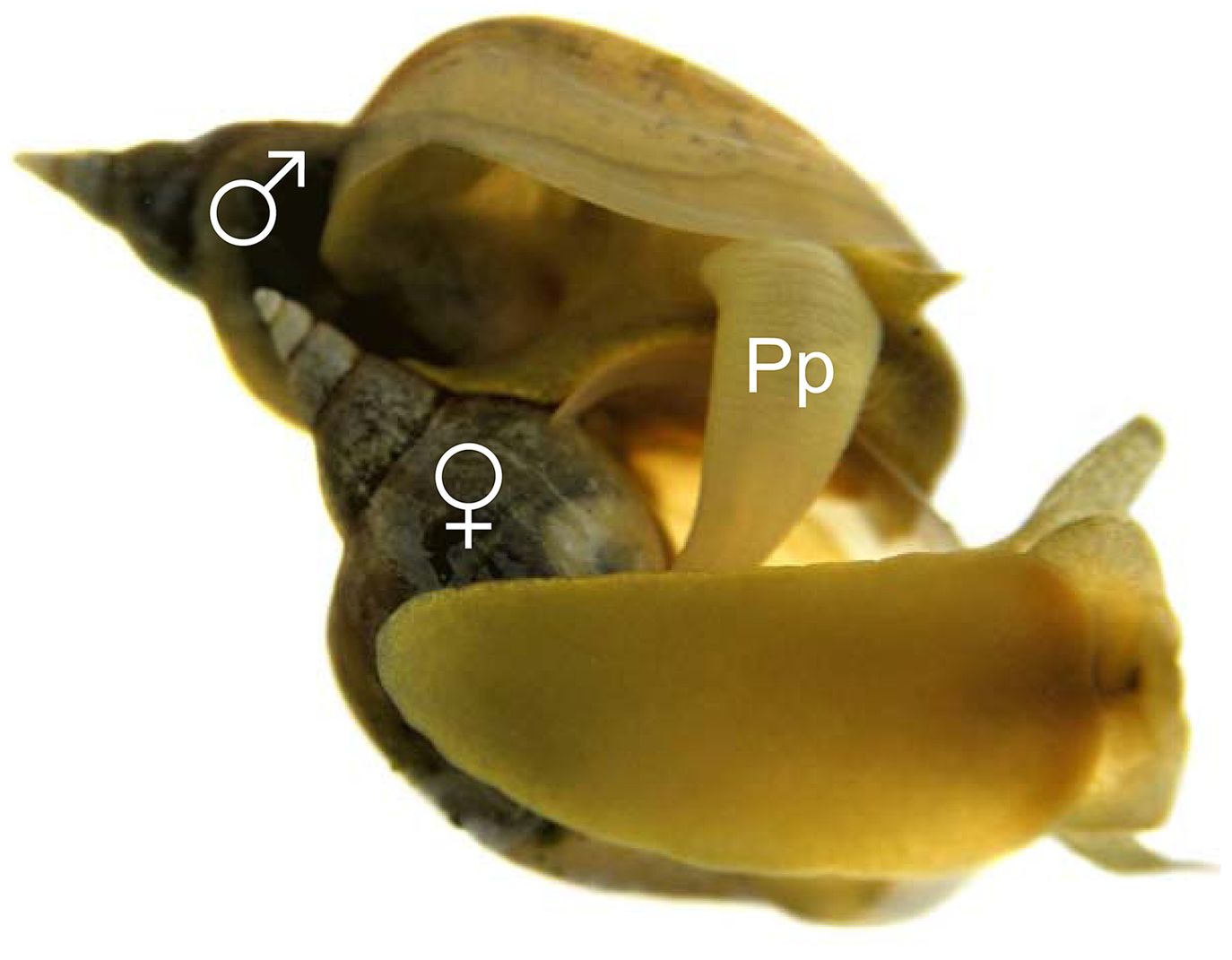
Lymnaea stagnalis in typical mating position of this species. The top snail is performing the male role (sperm donor), its white preputium (penis-carrying organ, Pp) can be seen inserted under the shell of the sperm recipient, where the female opening is located. During insemination, sperm (from the seminal vesicles) and seminal fluids (from the prostate gland) are transferred. Since these are simultaneous hermaphrodites, sexual roles can be swapped immediately afterwards.

== Life cycle ==
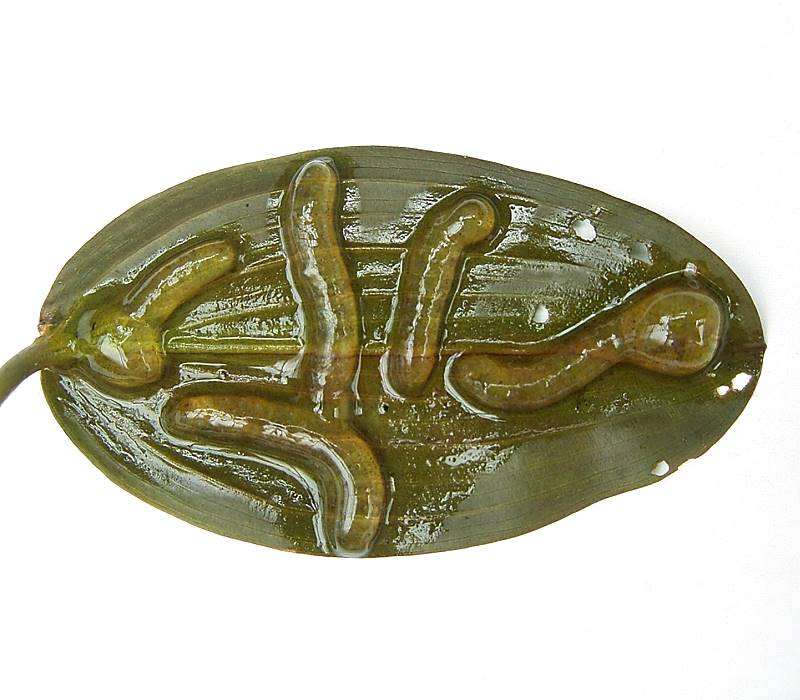
Eggs of Lymnaea stagnalis

Lymnaea stagnalis is a simultaneously hermaphroditic species and can mate in the male and female role, but within one copulation only one sexual role is performed at a time. Lymnaea stagnalis perform more inseminations in larger groups and prefer to inseminate novel over familiar partners. Such higher motivation to copulate when a new partner is encountered is known as the Coolidge effect and has been demonstrated in hermaphrodites firstly in 2007.

== Parasites ==
Lymnaea stagnalis is an intermediate host for:

- Moliniella anceps (Molin, 1859) Hubner, 1939

Other parasites of Lymnaea stagnalis include:

- Echinoparyphium aconiatum
- Echinoparyphium recurvatum
- Opisthioglyphe ranae
- Plagiorchis elegans
- Diplostomum pseudospathaceum
- Echinostoma revolutum
- Trichobilharzia szidati

Lymnaea stagnalis has been experimentally infected with Elaphostrongylus rangiferi.

== As aquarium pets ==
Lymnaea stagnalis snails can be easily kept in a freshwater aquarium at room temperature, and fed with various sorts of vegetables, salad, cabbage, fallen maple or oak leaves, cucumber slices and dandelion leaves. Fish food will also be eaten, as well as aquarium pests like algae, the Hydra viridissima polyp, and the eggs of other water snails.
