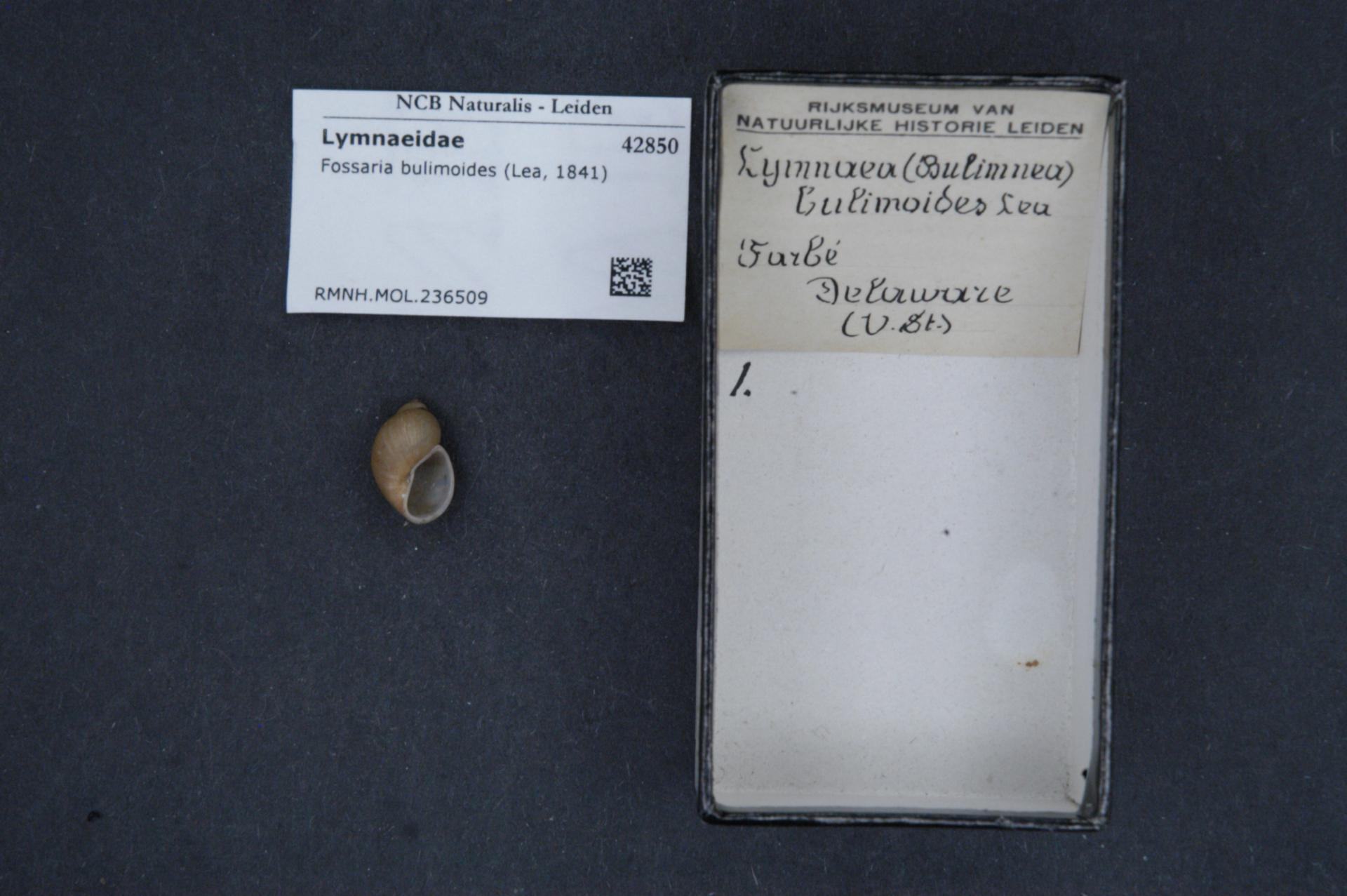

Conservation status
- Least Concern (IUCN 3.1)

- Secure (NatureServe)

Scientific classification
- Kingdom: Animalia
- Phylum: Mollusca
- Class: Gastropoda
- Superorder: Hygrophila
- Family: Lymnaeidae
- Genus: Galba
- Species: G. bulimoides

Binomial name
- Galba bulimoides (Lea, 1841)

Synonyms
- List: Fossaria (Bakerilymnaea) bulimoides (Lea, 1841); Fossaria (Bakerilymnaea) bulimoides bulimoides Lea, 1841; Fossaria bulimoides (Lea, 1841); Galba (Bakerilymnaea) bulimoides (Lea, 1841); Galba (Bakerilymnaea) bulimoides bulimoides Lea, 1841; Galba (Galba) bulimoides cassi Baker, 1911; Galba bulimoides bulimoides (Lea, 1841); Galba bulimoides cassi Baker, 1911; Galba hendersoni (Baker, 1909); Limnaea (Limnophysa) bulimoides Lea, 1841; Limnaea adelinae Tryon, 1863; Limnaea bulimoides (Lea, 1841); Limnaea cubensis var. bulimoides (Lea, 1841); Limnaea techella Haldeman, 1867; Limnaeus adelinae (Tryon, 1863); Limnaeus adelinae Tryon, 1863; Limnaeus bulimoides (Lea, 1841); Limnophysa adelinae (Tryon, 1863); Limnophysa bulimoides (Lea, 1841); Limnophysa gabbi var. adelinae (Tryon, 1863); Lymnaea (Stagnicola) bulimoides (Lea, 1841); Lymnaea bryanti Baker, 1905; Lymnaea bulimoides (Lea, 1841); Lymnaea hendersoni Baker, 1909; Lymnea bulimoides Lea, 1841; Sphaerogalba bulimoides (Lea, 1841); Stagnicola bulimoides (Lea, 1841)

= Galba bulimoides =

Species of freshwater snail native to North America

Galba bulimoides, commonly known as the prairie fossaria, is a species of freshwater snail in the family Lymnaeidae. It is native to North America.
