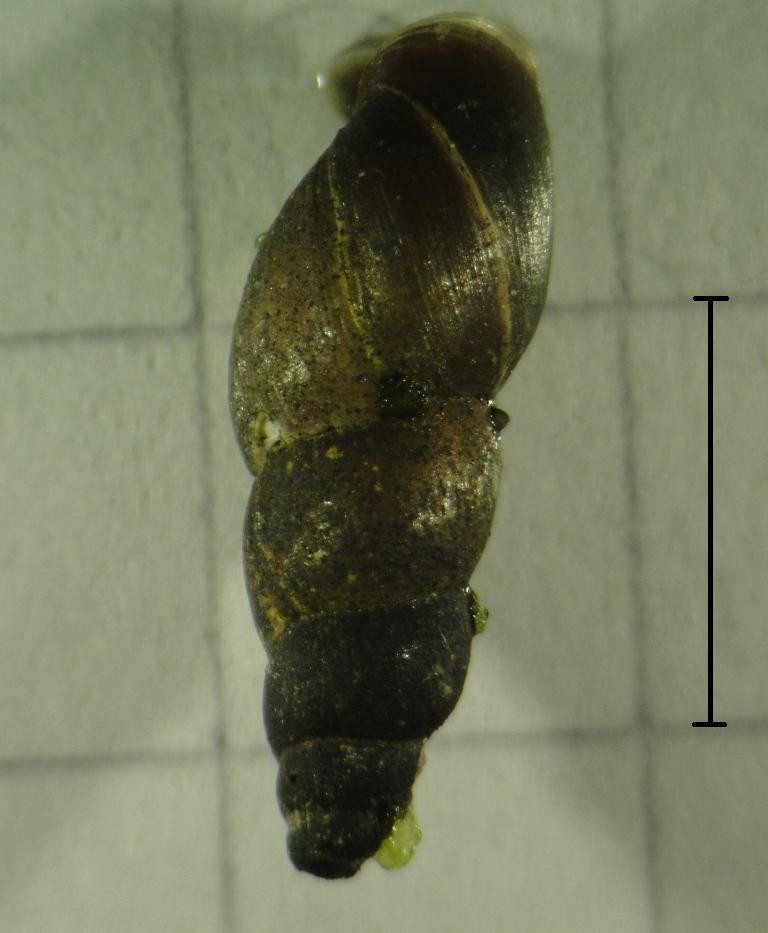
- Omphiscola glabra

Scientific classification
- Domain: Eukaryota
- Kingdom: Animalia
- Phylum: Mollusca
- Class: Gastropoda
- Superorder: Hygrophila
- Family: Lymnaeidae
- Subfamily: Lymnaeinae
- Genus: Omphiscola; Rafinesque, 1819

= Omphiscola =

Genus of gastropods

Omphiscola is a genus of small to medium-sized, air-breathing, freshwater snails, aquatic pulmonate gastropod mollusks in the family Lymnaeidae.

== Distribution ==
This is a European genus.

== Species ==
Species within the genus include:

- Omphiscola glabra (Müller, 1774) - type species

Nomen nudum

- Omphiscola pugio Beck, 1838

Species inquirenda

- Omphiscola reticulata (Gassies, 1867)
