= Ladislavella terebra =

Conservation status
- Least Concern (IUCN 3.1)

Scientific classification
- Kingdom: Animalia
- Phylum: Mollusca
- Class: Gastropoda
- Superorder: Hygrophila
- Family: Lymnaeidae
- Subfamily: Lymnaeinae
- Genus: Ladislavella
- Species: L. terebra

Binomial name
- Ladislavella terebra (Westerlund, 1885)

Synonyms
- Fossaria kultukiana B. Dybowski, 1913; Fossaria lindholmi W. Dybowski, 1913; Fossaria pulchelletta B. Dybowski, 1913; Ladislavella (Ladislavella) terebra (Westerlund, 1885); Ladislavella sorensiana B. Dybowski, 1913; Ladislavella sorensiana var. pulla B. Dybowski, 1912; Ladislavella sorensis B. Dybowski, 1913; Ladislavella sorica B. Dybowski, 1912; Leptolimnaea liogyra var. sorensis W. Dybowski, 1912; Leptolimnaea terebra (Westerlund, 1885); Leptolimnaea terebra var. sorensiana W. Dybowski, 1913; Leptolimnaea terebra var. sorensis W. Dybowski, 1912; Limnaea palustris var. terebra Westerlund, 1885; Lymnaea (Stagnicola) terebra (Westerlund, 1885); Lymnaea palustris bolotensis Mozley, 1934; Lymnaea palustris var. terebra Westerlund, 1885

Species of gastropod

Ladislavella terebra (Westerlund, 1885) (formerly known as Catascopia occulta) is a species of air-breathing freshwater snail, an aquatic pulmonate gastropod mollusc in the family Lymnaeidae, the pond snails.

== Taxonomy ==
Some authors classify this species as Stagnicola terebra, because the genus Catascopia Meier-Brook & Bargues, 2002 should not be distinguished based on DNA analysis only (genera should be distinguished morphologically and anatomically).

== Distribution ==
This species of snail is found in the Czech Republic in two localities only: in a small temporary pool near Kladruby nad Labem in the Eastern Bohemia and in temporary pool near the inflow of the Dyje River into the Morava river in Moravia, Germany, Poland and other areas.

== Habitat ==
It inhabits freshwater bodies.
