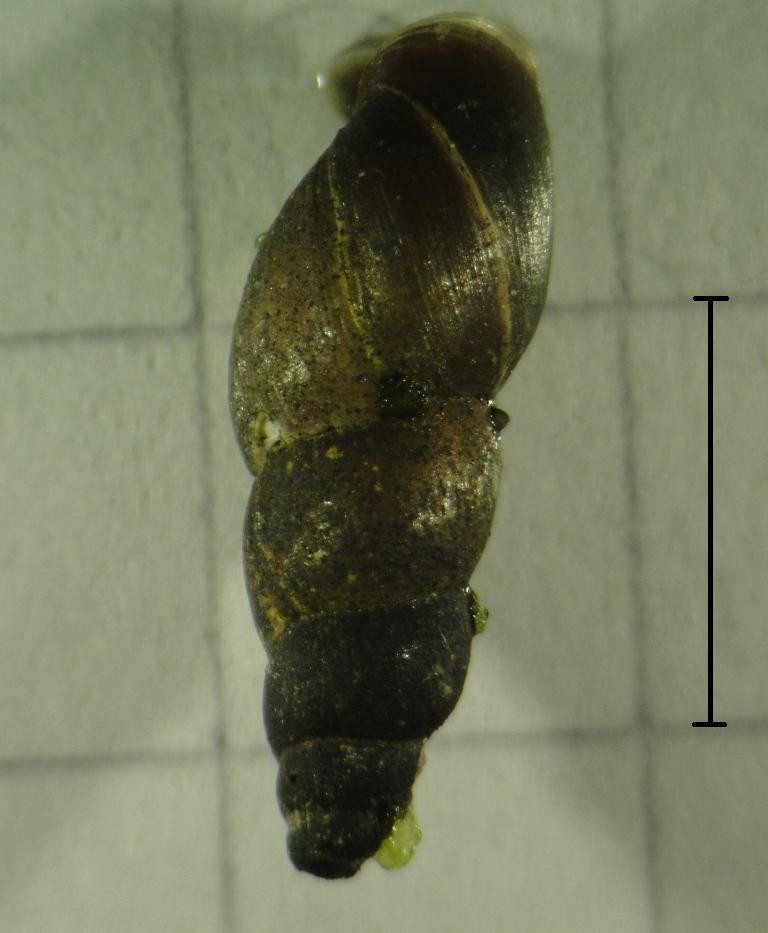
- A live individual of Omphiscola glabra on a paper grid, scale bar 1 cm

Scientific classification
- Kingdom: Animalia
- Phylum: Mollusca
- Class: Gastropoda
- Superorder: Hygrophila
- Family: Lymnaeidae
- Genus: Omphiscola
- Species: O. glabra

Binomial name
- Omphiscola glabra (Müller, 1774)
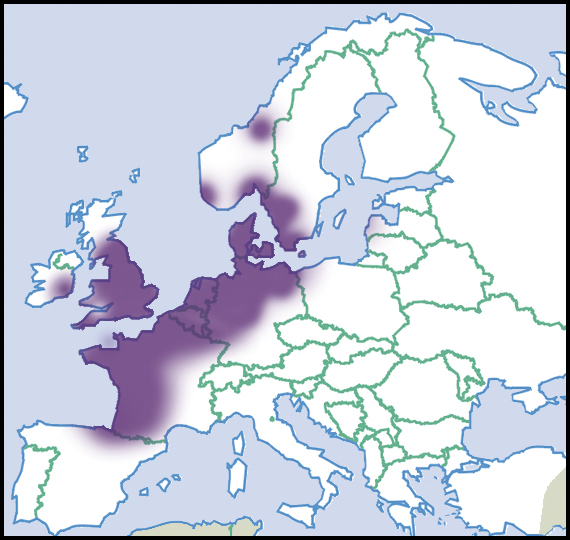
- Distribution in 2012, according to a paper by Francisco Welter-Schultes

Synonyms
- Buccinum glabrum; Lymnaea glabra; Stagnicola glaber

= Omphiscola glabra =

Species of gastropod

Omphiscola glabra, commonly known as the pond mud snail or mud pond snail, is a species of small to medium-size, air-breathing, freshwater snail, an aquatic pulmonate gastropod mollusk in the family Lymnaeidae. Omphiscola glabra is the type species of the genus Omphiscola.

== Distribution ==
This European snail can be found from southern Scandinavia (61° N) to southern Spain.

- endangered in Germany. Critically endangered in Western Germany (Rheinland-Pfalz, Saarland, Nordrhein-Westfalen, Hessen). Extinct in Bavaria.
- Netherlands
- one site in the south east of Ireland was found in 2009, but it is listed as extinct on the local Red List (2009).
- vulnerable in Great Britain

The distribution of Omphiscola glabra is very scattered and rare. It is seriously threatened, and has become locally extinct in many places. It is threatened by continuing habitat destruction because of drainage and intensive farming. Acriculturally induced eutrophication is also a threat. Omphiscola glabra has disappeared widely from urbanized areas such as London.

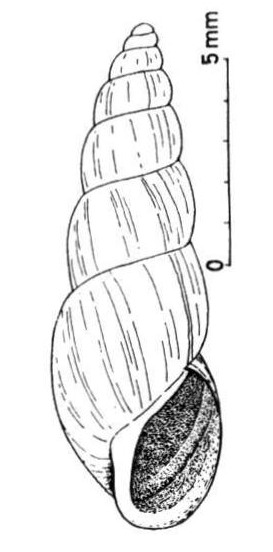
Drawing of the shell.

== Shell description ==
The shell is strongly cylindrical, horny, often with a brownish or blackish surface, the apex is blunt, 7–8 moderately convex whorls, with last whorl being twice as high as the narrow aperture, and with aperture often with white lip.

The height of the shell is 9–12 mm, up to 15 mm or up to 20 mm. The width of the shell is 3–4 mm, up to 5.5 mm.

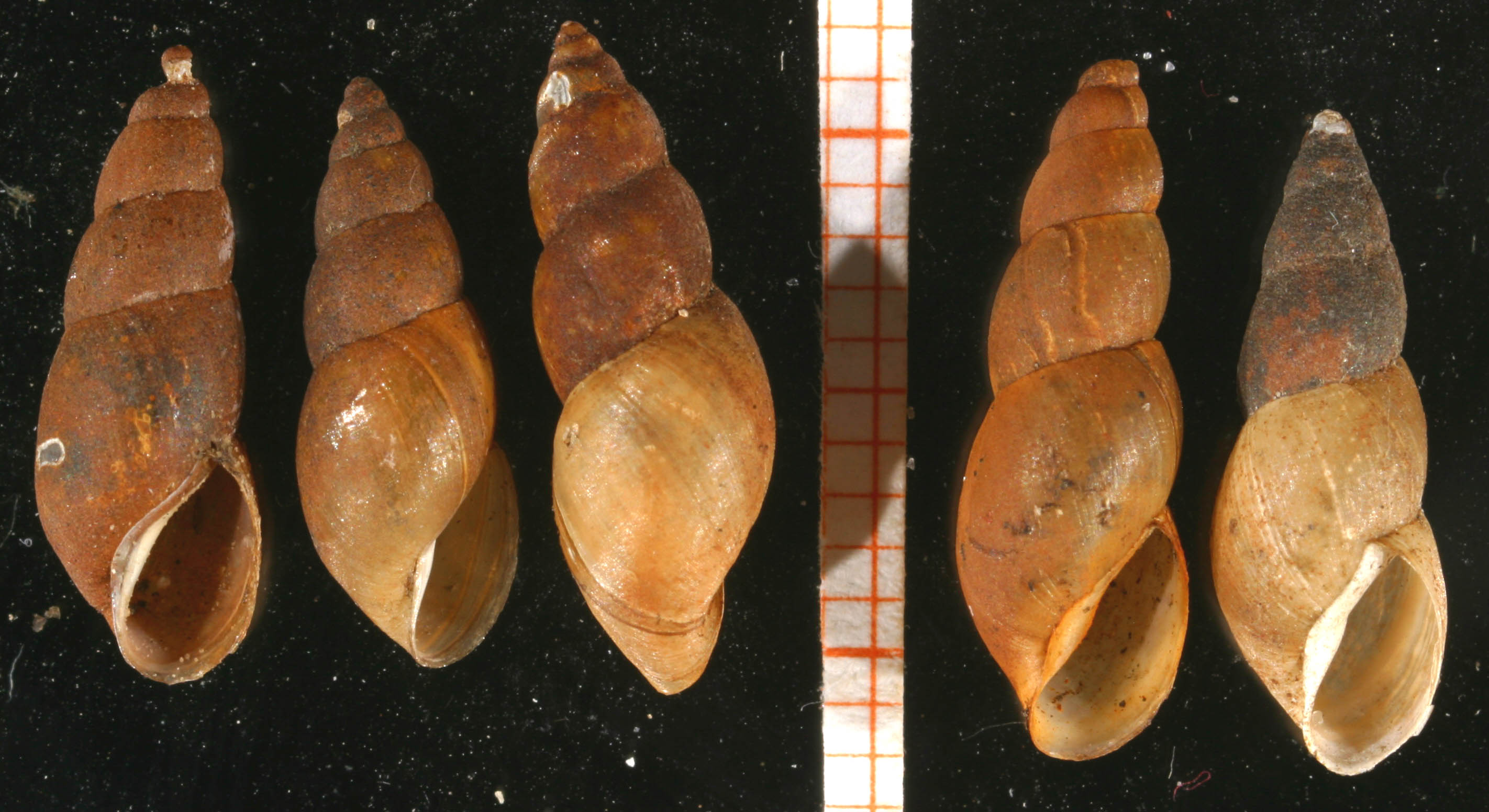
Five shells of Omphiscola glabra

== Habitat ==
This snail lives in places such as swampy meadows and ditches.

Omphiscola glabra is said to occur in small areas of standing water that have a lot of vegetation such as swamps, and also in standing forest waters with leaf litter, often in water with organic iron contents and low calcium contents.

In Central France, the populations of Omphiscola glabra are currently declining because its habitat is threatened by modern agricultural practices.

In Britain however, this species occurs in small standing waters that are low in nutrients, with poor aquatic flora, often in waters drying out periodically. They usually do not occur in habitats with high molluscan diversity, and usually in habitats on uncultivated land. They are calciphile and have a pH tolerance of 5.4–8.8.

There are a few known colonies in Ireland.

Reproduction begins in May. Juveniles hatch after 15–25 days. Omphiscola glabra has two generations per year.

== Parasites ==
Omphiscola glabra can serve as an intermediate host for several digenean trematodes. In France, Omphiscola glabra is naturally infected with Fasciola hepatica, Calicophoron daubneyi, and Haplometra cylindracea; in all, seven digenean species parasitize O. glabra in the Brenne Regional Natural Park, central France. Moreover, a report suggests that the species is also susceptible to Fascioloides magna infection.
