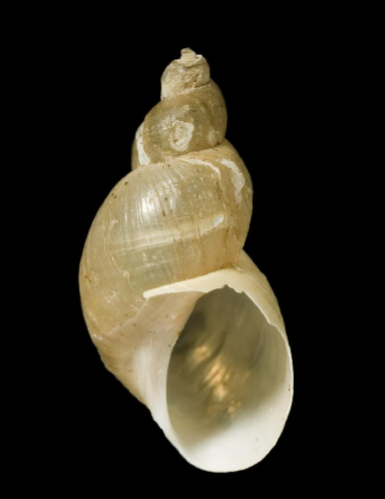
- Shell of Pectinidens diaphanus (specimen at the Natural History Museum, London)

Scientific classification
- Kingdom: Animalia
- Phylum: Mollusca
- Class: Gastropoda
- Superorder: Hygrophila
- Family: Lymnaeidae
- Genus: Pectinidens
- Species: P. diaphanus

Binomial name
- Pectinidens diaphanus (King, 1832)

Synonyms
- Galba (Pectinidens) diaphana (P. P. King, 1832) superseded combination; Limnaea brunneoflavida J. E. Cooper & Preston, 1910 (junior synonym); Limnaea lebruni Mabille, 1884 (a junior synonym); Limnaea patagonica Strebel, 1907 junior subjective synonym; Limnaea pictonica Rochebrune & Mabille, 1885 (a junior synonym); Limnaeus diaphanus P. P. King, 1832 superseded combination; Lymnaea andeana Pilsbry, 1911 (a junior synonym); Lymnaea diaphana King, 1832; Lymnaea diaphana inelegans Pilsbry, 1911 (a junior synonym); Lymnaea patagonica Strebel, 1907 junior subjective synonym; Lymnaea patagonica riochicoensis Pilsbry, 1911 (a junior synonym)

= Pectinidens =

Species of gastropod

Pectinidens diaphanus is a species of gastropods belonging to the family Lymnaeidae.

The species is found in America.
