= Ladislavella bonnevillensis =

Conservation status
- Critically Endangered (IUCN 3.1)

- Vulnerable (NatureServe)

Scientific classification
- Kingdom: Animalia
- Phylum: Mollusca
- Class: Gastropoda
- Superorder: Hygrophila
- Family: Lymnaeidae
- Genus: Ladislavella
- Species: L. bonnevillensis

Binomial name
- Ladislavella bonnevillensis (Call, 1884)

Synonyms
- Catascopia bonnevillensis (Call, 1884); Galba bonnevillensis (Call, 1884); Ladislavella (Walterlymnaea) bonnevillensis (Call, 1884); Limnophysa bonnevillensis Call, 1884; Lymnaea bonnevillensis Call, 1884; Stagnicola (Stagnicola) bonnevillensis (Call, 1884)

Species of gastropod

Ladislavella bonnevillensis is a species of air-breathing freshwater snail, an aquatic pulmonate gastropod mollusc in the family Lymnaeidae, the pond snails.

== Distribution ==
This species of pond snail is endemic to the Utah and Wyoming in the United States.
