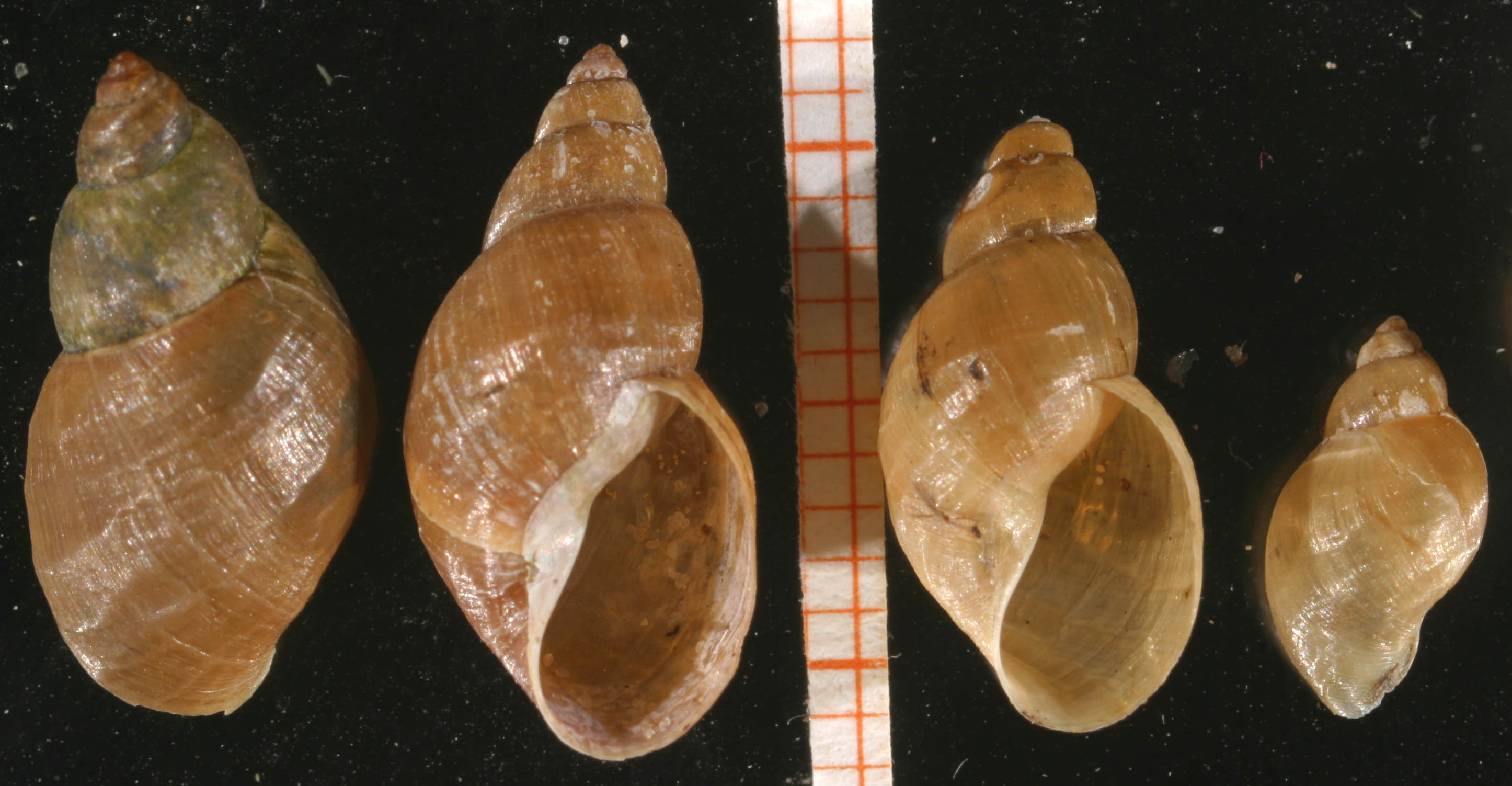
- Four shells of Stagnicola palustris

Conservation status
- Least Concern (IUCN 3.1)

Scientific classification
- Kingdom: Animalia
- Phylum: Mollusca
- Class: Gastropoda
- Superorder: Hygrophila
- Family: Lymnaeidae
- Genus: Stagnicola
- Species: S. palustris

Binomial name
- Stagnicola palustris (O. F. Müller, 1774)

Synonyms
- Lymnaea palustris; Lymnaea palustris f. turricula (Held, 1836); Stagnicola turricula (Held, 1836)

= Stagnicola palustris =

Species of gastropod

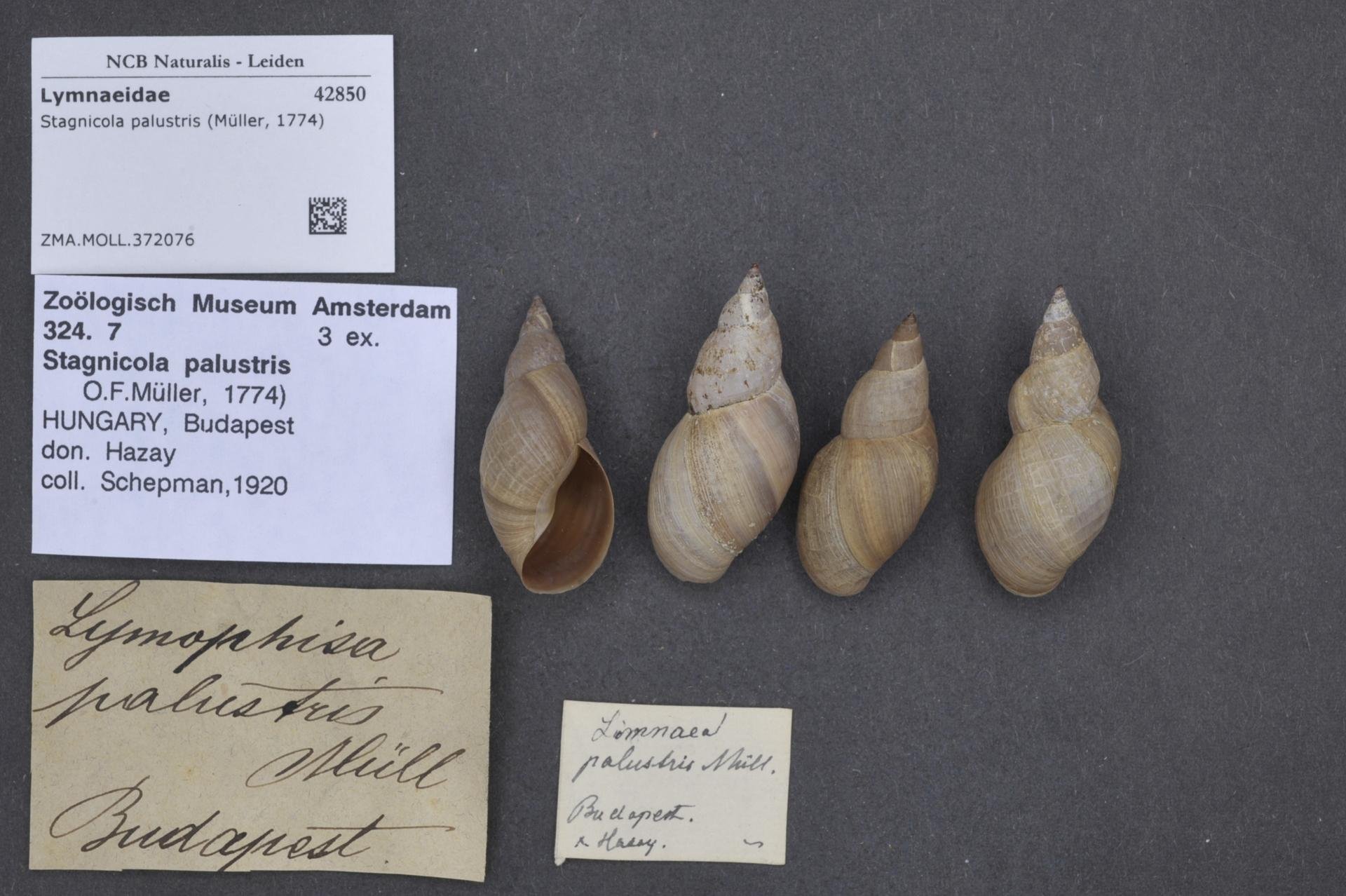
Stagnicola palustris (Müller, 1774), museum specimens Naturalis

Stagnicola palustris is a species of air-breathing freshwater snail, an aquatic pulmonate gastropod mollusc in the family Lymnaeidae, the pond snails.

Subspecies

- † Stagnicola palustris antilibanensis (Blanckenhorn, 1897)
- Stagnicola palustris palustris (O. F. Müller, 1774)

== Taxonomy ==
Stagnicola turricula is a synonym of Stagnicola palustris, because they are not genetically independent, but S. turricula is still sometimes listed separately.

== Description ==
The dimensions of the shell of an adult of this species are from about 10 to 18 mm (0.39 to 0.71 in) in length, and about 6 to 10 mm (0.24 to 0.39 in) in width.

== Distribution ==
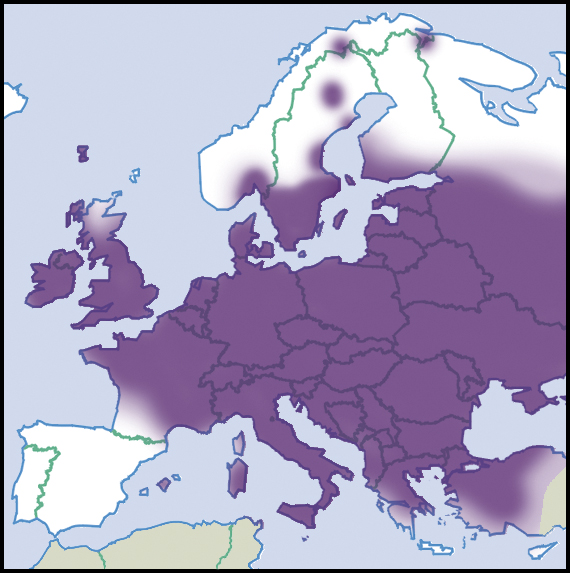
Distribution

This species of snail occurs in European countries and islands including:

- Croatia
- Stagnicola palustris – Czech Republic – data deficient (DD)
- Germany – (Arten der Vorwarnliste)
- Great Britain
- Netherlands
- Poland
- Slovakia

== Habitat ==
This snail lives in shallow, well-aerated freshwater habitats.

== See also ==
Stagnicola palustris-like snails in the North America are named Ladislavella elodes, but that may be the same species.
