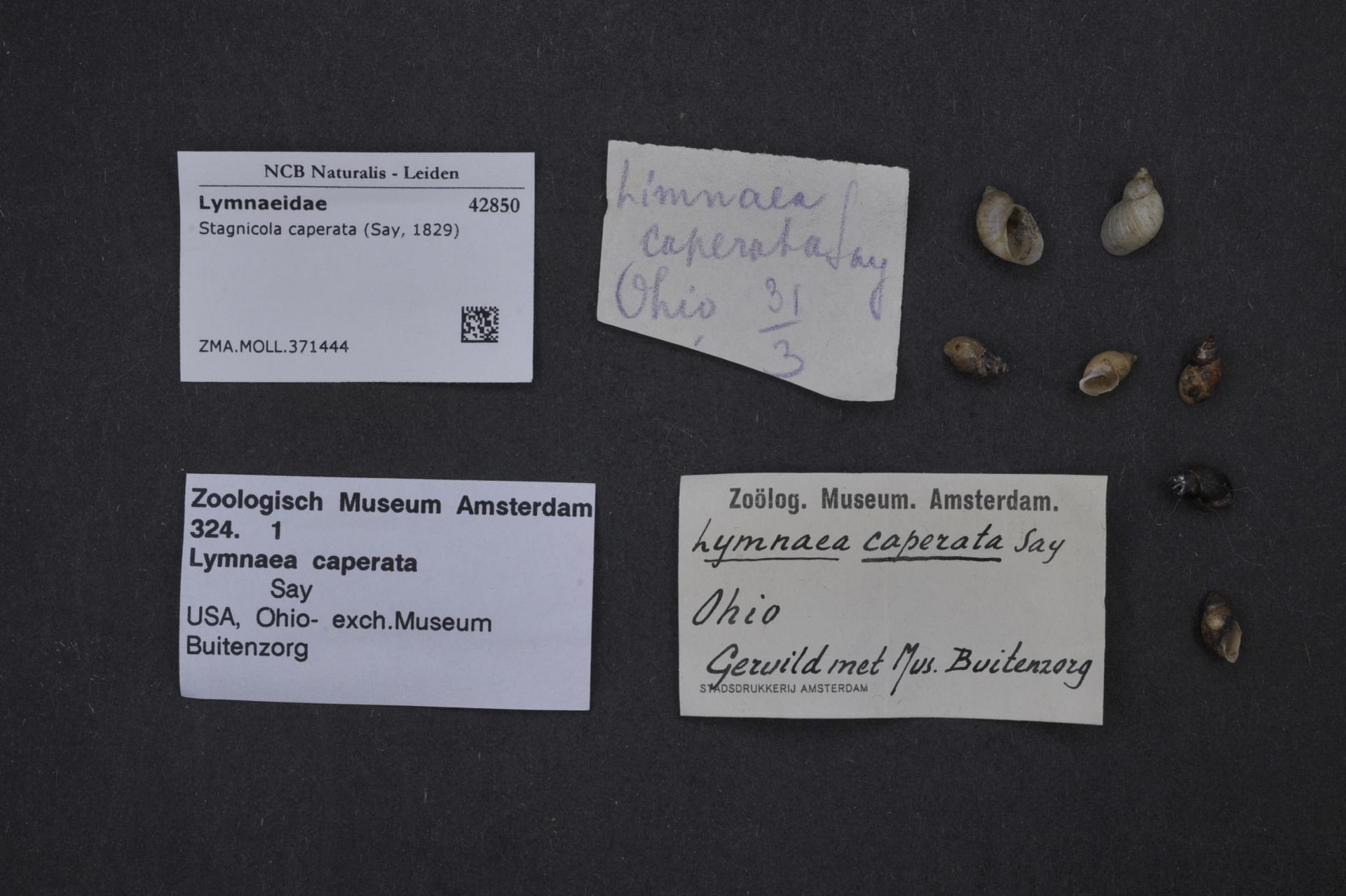
- Hinkleyia caperata

Scientific classification
- Kingdom: Animalia
- Phylum: Mollusca
- Class: Gastropoda
- Superorder: Hygrophila
- Family: Lymnaeidae
- Genus: Hinkleyia; Baker, 1928

= Hinkleyia =

Genus of freshwater snails

Hinkleyia is a genus of gastropods belonging to the family Lymnaeidae.

The species of this genus are found in Northern America.

Species:

- Hinkleyia caperata (Say, 1829)
- Hinkleyia pilsbryi (Hemphill, 1890)
