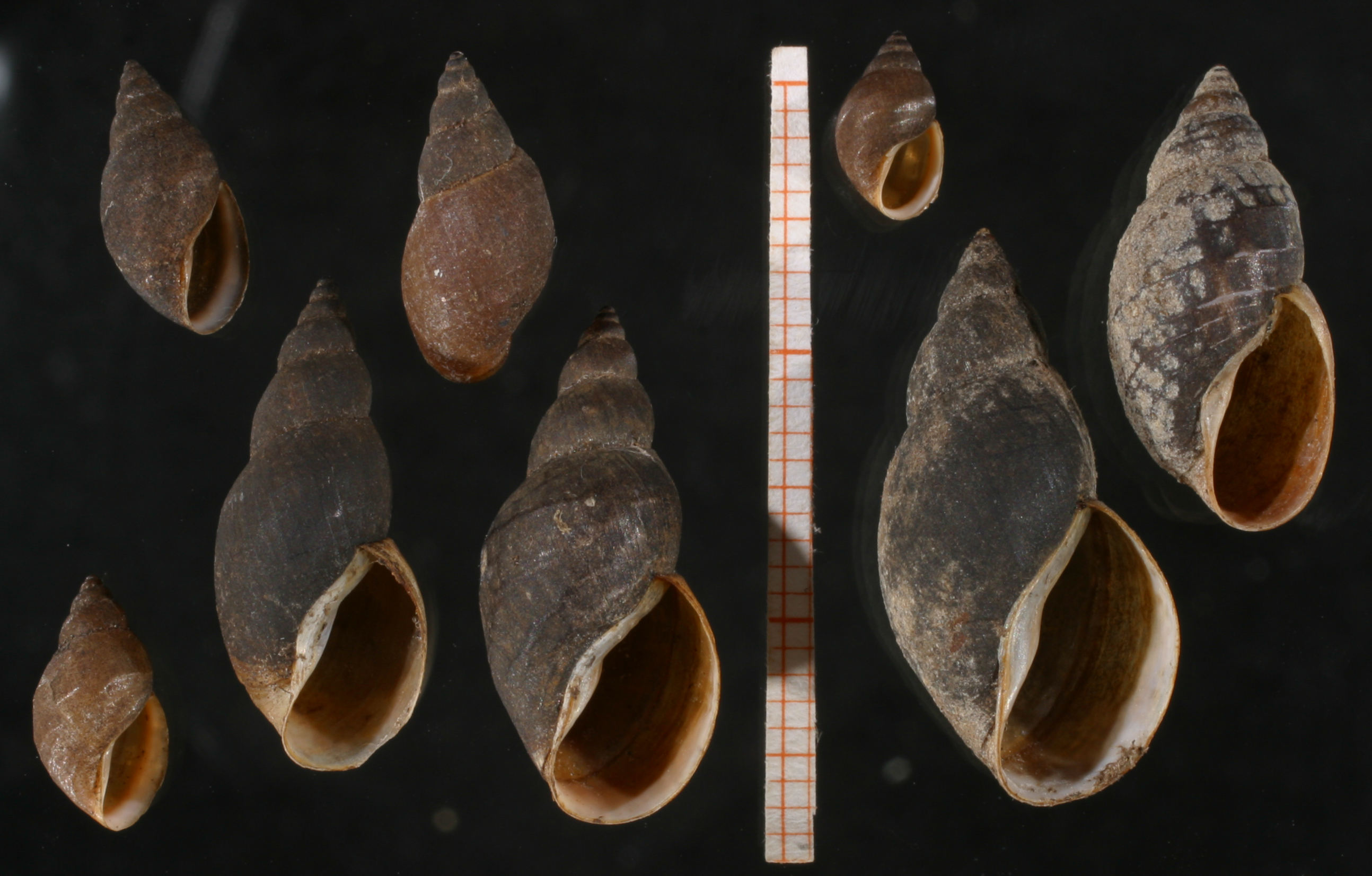
- Eight shells of Stagnicola fuscus, scale bar in mm and cm

Conservation status
- Least Concern (IUCN 3.1)

Scientific classification
- Kingdom: Animalia
- Phylum: Mollusca
- Class: Gastropoda
- Superorder: Hygrophila
- Family: Lymnaeidae
- Genus: Stagnicola
- Species: S. fuscus

Binomial name
- Stagnicola fuscus (C. Pfeiffer, 1821)

Synonyms
- Limnaeus fuscus Pfeiffer, 1821; Lymnaea fuscus C. Pfeiffer, 1821; Stagnicola disjuncta Puton, 1847; Stagnicola leachiana Risso, 1826; Stagnicola truncata Buvignier, 1833; Stagnicola variabilis Millet, 1854; Stagnicola vogesiaca Puton, 1847

= Stagnicola fuscus =

Species of gastropod

Stagnicola fuscus is a species of freshwater snail, an aquatic gastropod mollusk in the family Lymnaeidae, the pond snails.

Correa et al. (2010) proposed that species of clade C2 (including Stagnicola fuscus) should all be called Lymnaea, according to the principle of priority of the International Code of Zoological Nomenclature (ICZN). Then this species would be named Lymnaea fusca Pfeiffer, 1821.

== Distribution ==
The Lymnaea palustris aggregate species is recorded from western Europe to beyond the Arctic Circle and across Siberia. The full range of this segregate is incompletely known but is likely to be Eurosiberian Wide Temperate. This species is found in the Czech Republic (in Bohemia only), Germany, the Netherlands, Great Britain, Ireland, Croatia and other areas.

== Description ==
The 10–25 × 6–12 mm shell is slender with the whorls often not very convex and nearly always with flat sutures. It is brown, irregularly striated (surface ornamented with strong spiral striae which cross-cut the radial growth striae – this can lead to the development of quadrate plates) and the apertural height is about 50% of the shell height. The umbilicus is closed.

== Biotope ==
This snail lives in bodies of freshwater.
