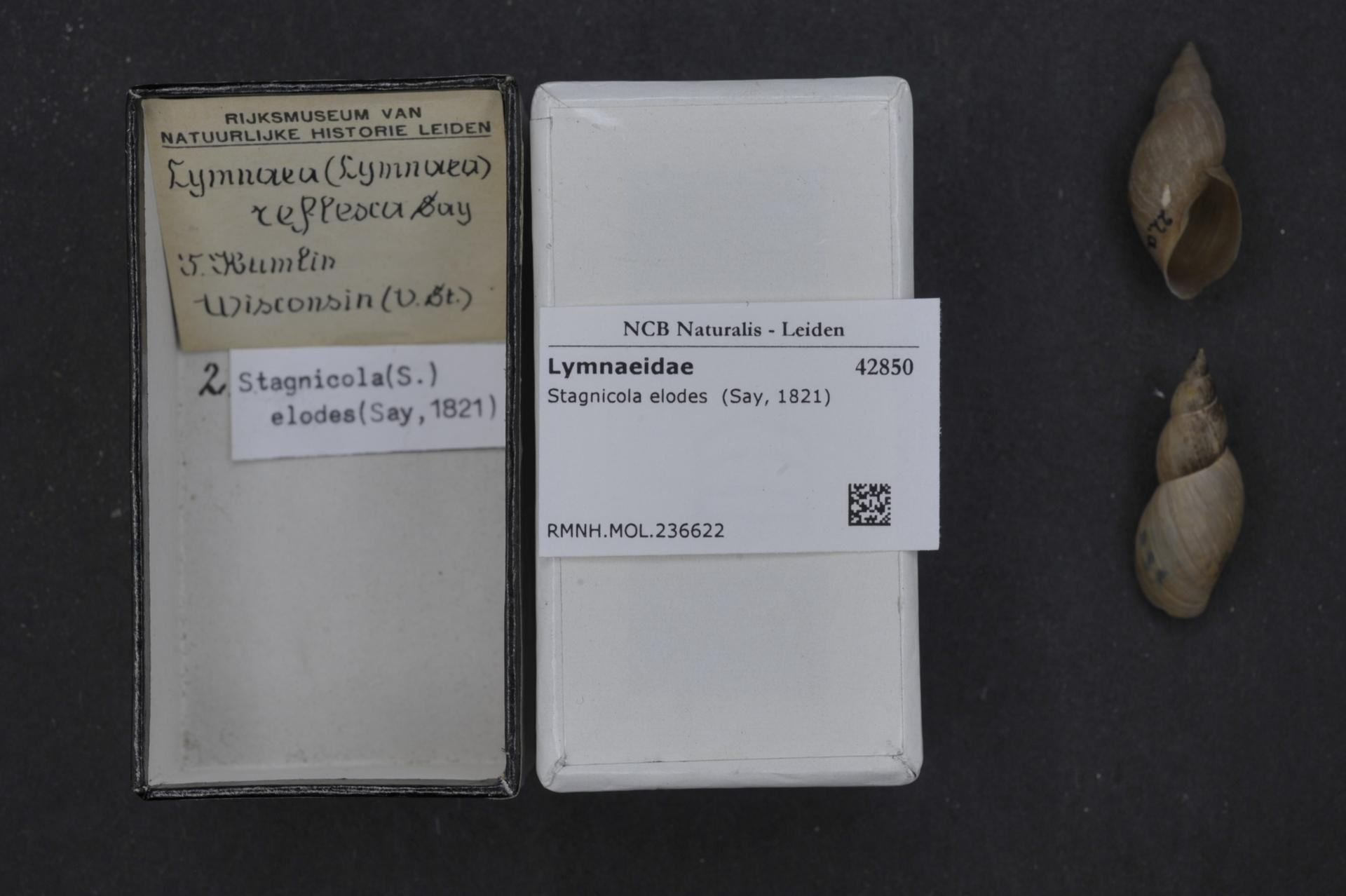

Conservation status
- Least Concern (IUCN 3.1)

- Secure (NatureServe)

Scientific classification
- Kingdom: Animalia
- Phylum: Mollusca
- Class: Gastropoda
- Superorder: Hygrophila
- Family: Lymnaeidae
- Subfamily: Lymnaeinae
- Genus: Ladislavella
- Species: L. elodes

Binomial name
- Ladislavella elodes (Say, 1821)

Synonyms
- Lymnaea elodes (Say, 1821); Lymnaea palustris (Muller, 1774); Lymneus elodes Say, 1821; Stagnicola elodes (Say, 1821); Stagnicola palustris (Muller, 1774); Stagnicola reflexa (Say, 1821)

= Ladislavella elodes =

Marsh Pondsnail

Species of gastropod

Ladislavella elodes, the marsh pondsnail, is a species of air-breathing freshwater snail, an aquatic pulmonate gastropod mollusc in the family Lymnaeidae, the pond snails.

== Taxonomy ==
There is a very similar species Stagnicola palustris in Europe, and both species could in fact be one and the same species.

== Distribution ==
The distribution of Ladislavella elodes in North America includes all of Canada and the Great Lakes region of the United States.

== Ecology ==
Parasites of Ladislavella elodes include:

- Echinostoma revolutum
