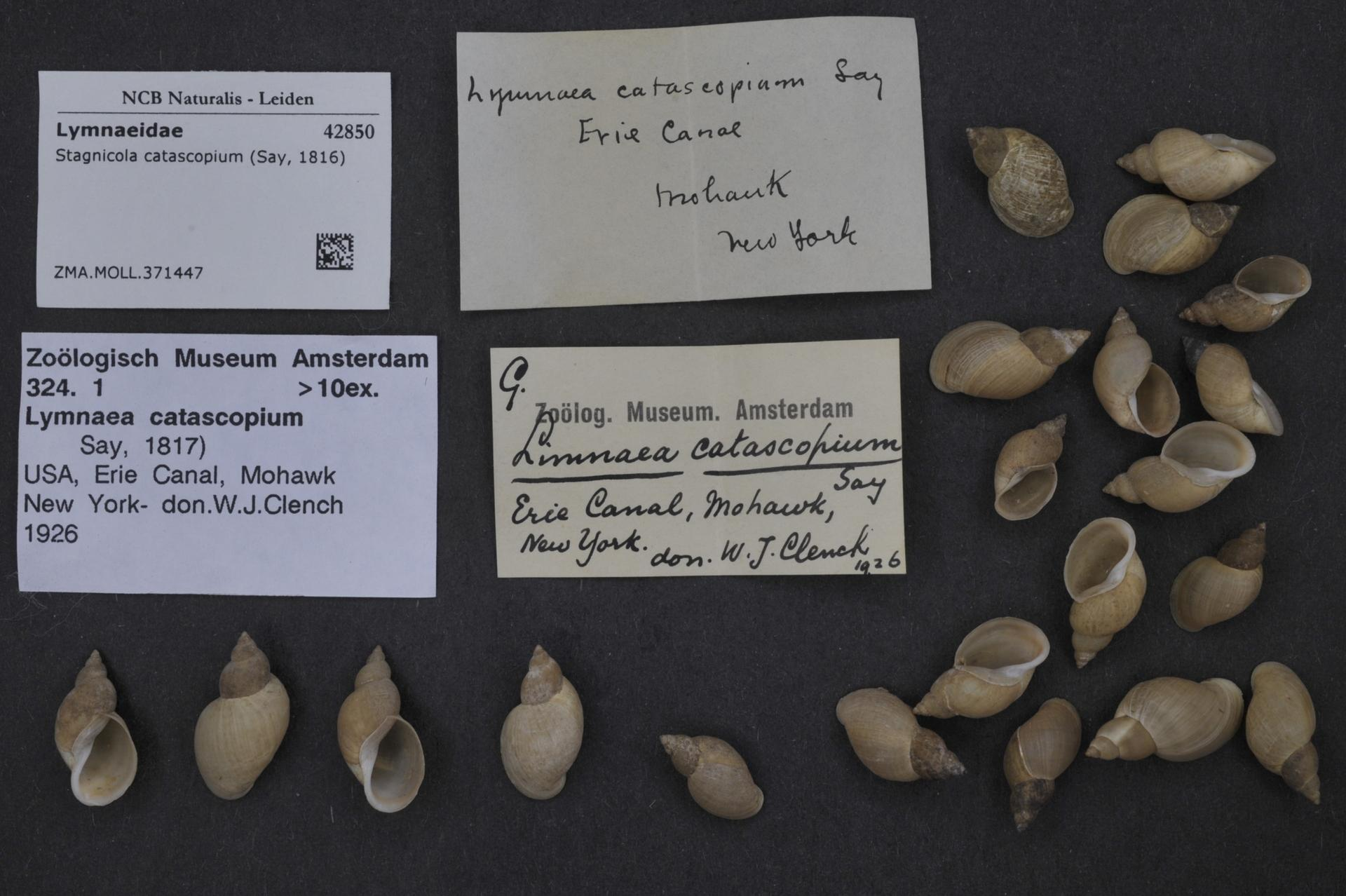

Conservation status
- Secure (NatureServe)

Scientific classification
- Kingdom: Animalia
- Phylum: Mollusca
- Class: Gastropoda
- Superorder: Hygrophila
- Family: Lymnaeidae
- Genus: Ladislavella
- Species: L. catascopium

Binomial name
- Ladislavella catascopium (Say, 1817)

Synonyms
- Stagnicola catascopium (Say, 1817)

= Ladislavella catascopium =

Species of gastropod

Ladislavella catascopium is a species of gastropods belonging to the family Lymnaeidae.

The species is found in Northern America.
