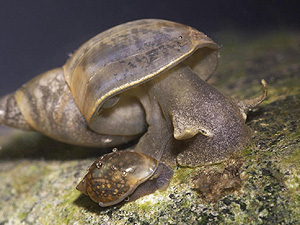
- Lymnaea stagnalis is the large snail behind the smaller one, Physa sp.

Scientific classification
- Kingdom: Animalia
- Phylum: Mollusca
- Class: Gastropoda
- Subterclass: Tectipleura
- Superorder: Hygrophila
- Superfamily: Lymnaeoidea
- Family: Lymnaeidae; Rafinesque, 1815

Genera
- See text

Diversity
- about 100 freshwater species or less than 100 or more than 250

Synonyms
- Limnophysidae W. Dybowski, 1903 (a junior synonym)

= Lymnaeidae =

Family of gastropods

Lymnaeidae, common name the pond snails, is a taxonomic family of small to large air-breathing freshwater snails, aquatic pulmonate gastropod mollusks, that belong to the clade Hygrophila.

Lymnaeidae is the only family within the superfamily Lymnaeoidea (according to the taxonomy of the Gastropoda by Bouchet & Rocroi, 2005).

== Taxonomy ==
=== 2005 taxonomy ===
Bouchet & Rocroi (2005) recognized four subfamilies within Lymnaeidae:

- subfamily Lymnaeinae Rafinesque, 1815 - synonyms: Amphipepleinae Pini, 1877; Limnophysidae W. Dybowski, 1903; Acellinae Hannibal, 1912; Fossariinae B. Dybowski 1913
- subfamily Lancinae Hannibal, 1914
- † subfamily Scalaxinae Zilch, 1959
- † subfamily Valencieniinae Kramberger-Gorjanovic, 1923 - synonym: Clivunellidae Kochansky-Devidé & Sliskovic, 1972

=== 2013 taxonomy ===
Vinarski (2013) established a new subfamily Radicinae within Lymnaeidae, but be considered position neither of Lancinae nor of extinct genera.

- subfamily Radicinae Vinarski, 2013

== Cladogram ==
Correa et al. (2010) examined phylogenetic relationships among 50 taxa of this family using a supermatrix approach (concatenation of the 16S, internal transcribed spacers ITS1 and ITS2 genes) involving both maximum likelihood and Bayesian inference. Her phylogenetic analysis demonstrates the existence of three deep clades of Lymnaeidae representing the main geographic origin of species (America, Eurasia and the Indo-Pacific region). It demonstrates that the nomenclature of most genera in the Lymnaeidae does not reflect evolutionary relationships.

A cladogram based on sequences of 16S, internal transcribed spacers ITS1 and ITS2 genes showing phylogenic relations of Lymnaeidae by Correa et al. (2010):

- Lymnaeidae
  - - n=16, C3a
      - - Austropeplea lessoni
        - Bullastra cumingiana
      - - - Austropeplea tomentosa
          - Kutikina hispida
        - - - Austropeplea ollula
            - Austropeplea viridis
          - Lymnaea sp. from Hawaii and from China
    - Radix, n=17, C3b
      - - Radix labiata
        - - Radix peregra
          - - Radix ampla
            - Radix lagotis
      - - - Radix auricularia
          - Radix ovata
        - - Radix sp. from Philippines
          - - Radix sp. from Canada and Radix sp. from Romania
            - - - Radix natalensis
                - Radix luteola
              - - Radix quadrasi
                - Radix rubiginosa
  - n=18
    - C2
      - Omphiscola glabra
      - - Lymnaea stagnalis
        - - Stagnicola corvus
          - - Stagnicola fuscus
            - - Stagnicola sp. from Ukraine
              - - Stagnicola palustris
                - Stagnicola turricula
    - - Pseudosuccinea columella
      - - Bulimnea megasoma
        - - - - Lymnaea viatrix
              - - Lymnaea neotropica
                - - Fossaria bulimoides
                  - Lymnaea cubensis
            - - Lymnaea sp. from Colombia
              - - Galba truncatula
                - - Lymnaea cousini
                  - - Fossaria obrussa
                    - Lymnaea humilis
          - - Lymnaea diaphana
            - - Stagnicola caperata
              - - Lymnaea occulta
                - - Stagnicola sp. from Montana
                  - - Stagnicola bonnevillensis
                    - - - Stagnicola elrodi
                        - Stagnicola emarginata
                      - - Stagnicola elodes
                        - - Stagnicola catascopium
                          - Stagnicola sp. from Manitoba

The nomenclature of genera has been one of the most confusing issues in the Lymnaeidae systematics. Most genus names are not fixed and are based more on phenotypic resemblances than on sound evolutionary and phylogenetic considerations. For instance, a single genus in Lymnaeidae was recognized by Walter (1968), two by Hubendick (1951), and up to 34 genera by others. Results by Correa et al. (2010) indicate that genera in Lymnaeidae do not reflect phylogenetic relationships, to the notable exception of Radix (including Radix natalensis).

The type species of Lymnaea is Lymnaea stagnalis Linnaeus, 1758; the type species of Stagnicola Jeffreys, 1830 is Stagnicola palustris (= Lymnaea palustris); and the type species of Omphiscola Rafinesque, 1819 is Omphiscola glabra. However, it is clear that these three species belong to the same clade (C2) and that Lymnaea is not a monophyletic group. Correa et al. (2010) proposed that species of clade C2 should all be called Lymnaea, according to the principle of priority of the International Code of Zoological Nomenclature (ICZN). By extension, Stagnicola should not be used to name species in clade C1a since the type species belongs to clade C2. Meier-Brook & Bargues (2002) suggested including Stagnicola emarginata, Stagnicola elodes, Stagnicola catascopium and Lymnaea occulta within a new genus Catascopia, while Stagnicla caperata would belong to the genus Hinkleyia Baker, 1928. The phylogeny by Correa et al. (2010) does not conflict with this nomenclature, although it would seem preferable to identify all species of clade C1a with the same name to reflect the close evolutionary relationships among these species. Hinkleyia would be the preferable name according to the ICZN. On the other hand, at least four genera names have been used for species of clade C1b: Lymnaea Lamarck, 1799; Galba Schrank, 1803; Fossaria Westerlund, 1885; and Bakerilymnaea. In the light of the present results, it would be preferable to unify nomenclature. According to the ICZN, Lymnaea should be the unified name, but given that the type species belongs to clade C2, Galba could be a more appropriate name. Finally, as said above, Austropeplea Cotton, 1942 is not a monophyletic group, and employing the genus Kutikina Ponder & Waterhouse, 1997 (one species: Kutikina hispida) seems unjustified on the basis of the current phylogeny. This would also be consistent with results of Puslednik et al. (2009). It would be preferable to use Bullastra Pfeiffer, 1839 for all species of clade C3a to fit the ICZN.

== Genera ==
Genera in the family Lymnaeidae include:

subfamily Lymnaeinae

- Acella Haldeman, 1841
- Aenigmomphiscola Kruglov & Starobogatov, 1981
- Bulimnea Haldeman, 1841
- Corvusiana Servain, 1881 - probably a subgenus of Stagnicola
  - subgenus Corvusiana sensu stricto
  - subgenus Kuesterilymnaea Vinarski, 2003
- Erinna H. Adams & A. Adams, 1858
- Galba Schrank, 1803 - synonym: Fossaria Westerlund, 1885
  - subgenus Galba sensu stricto
  - subgenus Bakerilymnaea Weyrauch, 1964
  - subgenus Sibirigalba Kruglov et Starobogatov, 1985
- Hinkleyia F. C. Baker, 1928
- Ladislavella B. Dybowski, 1913 - synonym: Catascopia Meier-Brook & Bargues, 2002
  - subgenus Lymnaea sensu stricto
  - subgenus Kazakhlymnaea Kruglov & Starobogatov, 1984
- Lymnaea Lamarck, 1799 - type genus of the family Lymnaeidae
- Omphiscola Rafinesque, 1819
- Pseudoisidora Thiele, 1931
  - subgenus Pseudoisidora sensu stricto
  - subgenus Pseudobulinus Kruglov & Starobogatov, 1993
- Pseudosuccinea F. C. Baker, 1908
- Sphaerogalba Kruglov & Starobogatov, 1985 - possibly a synonym of Bakerilymnaea
- Stagnicola Leach in Jeffreys, 1830
- Walhiana Servain, 1881 - probably a subgenus of Stagnicola
- Walterigalba Kruglov & Starobogatov, 1985 - probably a subgenus of Hinkleyia

Genera brought into synonymy

- Catascopia Meier-Brook & Bargues, 2002: synonym of Ladislavella B. Dybowski, 1913
- Fossaria Westerlund, 1885: synonym of Galba Schrank, 1803
- Limnaea: synonym of Lymnaea Lamarck, 1799
- Limneus Sandberger, 1875: synonym of Lymnaea Lamarck, 1799
- Limneus auct.: synonym of Lymnaea Lamarck, 1799
- Limnophysa Fitzinger, 1833: synonym of Stagnicola Jeffreys, 1830
- Lymnaeus: synonym of Lymnaea Lamarck, 1799
- Nasonia F. C. Baker, 1928: synonym of Galba (Bakerilymnaea) Weyrauch, 1964 represented as Galba Schrank, 1803
- Truncatuliana Servain, 1881: synonym of Galba Schrank, 1803
- Walterlymnaea Starobogatov & Budnikova, 1976: synonym of Ladislavella B. Dybowski, 1913

subfamily Amphipepleinae Pini, 1877 (synonym: Radicinae Vinarski, 2013)

- Austropeplea B. C. Cotton, 1942 - synonym: Kutikina Ponder & Waterhouse, 1997 (there was one species Kutikina hispida).
- Bullastra Bergh, 1901
- Lantzia Jousseaume, 1872
- Limnobulla Kruglov & Starobogatov, 1985
- Myxas G. B. Sowerby, 1822
- Orientogalba Kruglov & Starobogatov, 1985
- Pacifimyxas Kruglov & Starobogatov, 1985
- Pectinidens Pilsbry, 1911
- Radix Montfort, 1810 - type genus of the subfamily Radicinae
  - subgenus Radix sensu stricto
  - subgenus Peregriana Servain, 1881
- Cerasina Kobelt, 1880 - taxon inquirendum: maybe it is a synonym of Radix

Genera brought into synonymy

- Amphipeplea Nilsson, 1822: synonym of Myxas G. B. Sowerby I, 1822
- Auriculariana Servain, 1881: synonym of Radix Montfort, 1810
- Cyclolimnaea Dall, 1905: synonym of Myxas G. B. Sowerby I, 1822
- Gulnaria Turton, 1831: synonym of Radix Montfort, 1810
- Kutikina Ponder & Waterhouse, 1997: synonym of Austropeplea Cotton, 1942
- Neritostoma H. Adams & A. Adams, 1855: synonym of Radix Montfort, 1810

subfamily Lancinae

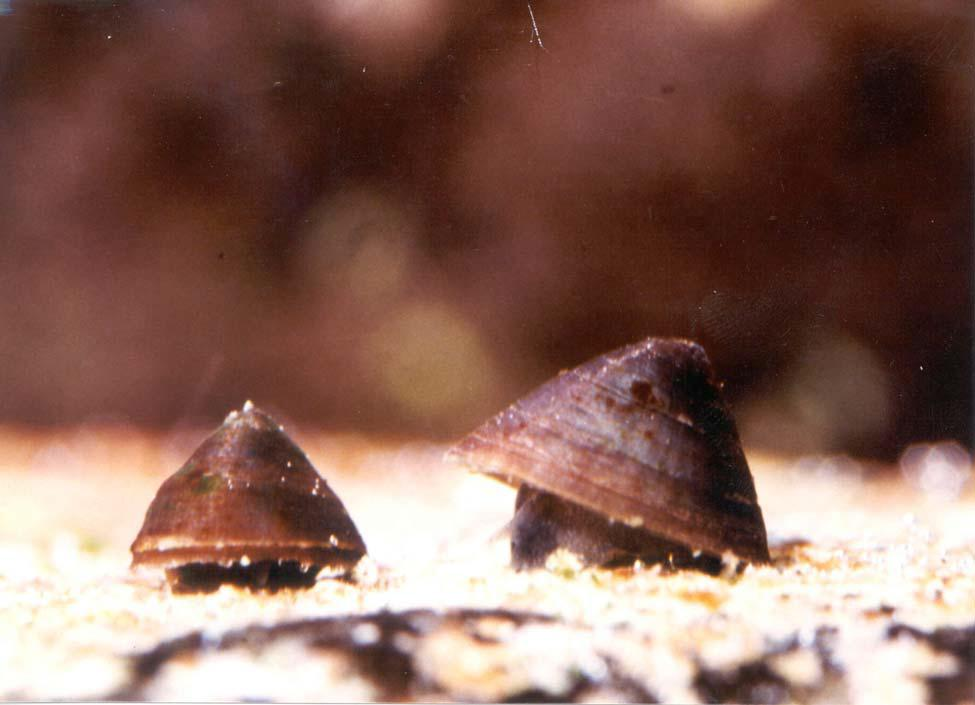
Idaholanx fresti

- Idaholanx Clark, Campbell & Lydeard, 2017 - with the only species Idaholanx fresti Clark, Campbell & Lydeard, 2017
- Lanx Clessin, 1880 - type genus of the subfamily Lancinae

† subfamily Scalaxinae

- Scalaxis Pilsbry, 1909 - type genus of the subfamily Scalaxinae

† subfamily Valencieniinae

- † Provalenciennesia Gorjanović-Kramberger, 1923
- † Valenciennius Rousseau, 1842 - type genus of the subfamily Valencieniinae

Genera brought into synonymy

- † Provalenciennius Gorjanović-Kramberger, 1923: synonym of † Provalenciennesia Gorjanović-Kramberger, 1923
- † Valenciennesia Fischer, 1859: synonym of † Valenciennius Rousseau, 1842

subfamily ?

- Adelinella Wenz, 1922
- † Boskovicia Brusina, 1894
- † Clivunella Katzer, 1918
- † Corymbina Bulowski, 1892
- Fisherola Hannibal, 1912
- Glacilimnea Iredale, 1943
- † Hiscerus Gorjanović-Kramberger, 1923
- Peplimnea Iredale, 1943
- Simlimnea Iredale, 1943
- † Undulotheca Gorjanović-Kramberger, 1923
- † Velutinopsis Sandberger, 1875
- † Zagrabica Brusina, 1884

== Distribution ==
Lymnaeidae snails occur worldwide, however, most species occur in the Palearctic and Nearctic regions. An unidentified fragmentary lymnaeid from deposits of the Meyer Desert Formation (reported in 2003) was the first freshwater snail recorded from Antarctica.

== Description ==
This family exhibits a great diversity in shell morphology but extremely homogeneous anatomical traits. Diversity of shell morphology is linked to substantial eco-phenotypic plasticity. Hubendick (1951) illustrated this point by compiling up to 1143 species names, a large number of which he synonymized. In contrast, the anatomy of their reproductive tracts (including prostate, penis and preputium) is extremely homogeneous. Immunological, cytogenetical, enzyme electrophoresis studies, and DNA-based approaches have demonstrated extensive homoplasy in anatomical characters.

== Ecology ==
Lymnaeidae are of major medical and veterinary importance since they act as vectors of parasites (helminths, mainly trematodes, e.g., Fasciola liver flukes) that severely affect human populations and livestock, and cause important economic losses. Lymnaeids serve as intermediate hosts of at least 71 trematode species distributed among 13 families, including some species of Schistosomatidae and Echinostomatidae, with implications for human health, and Paramphistomum daubneyi, which is of veterinary interest. The most emblematic case of parasite transmitted by lymnaeids is Fasciola hepatica (Digenea: Fasciolidae), the agent of fascioliasis. Mollusks, generally lymnaeids, are required as intermediate hosts to complete the life cycle of Fasciola hepatica. At least 20 species of Lymnaeidae have been described as potential vectors of fascioliasis.
