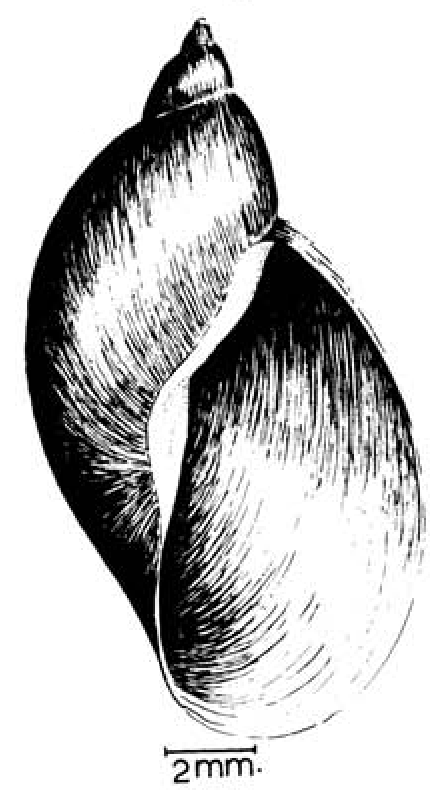
- This drawing of the apertural view of a shell of Radix natalensis shows one of the extreme shell forms of this species.

Conservation status
- Least Concern (IUCN 3.1)

Scientific classification
- Kingdom: Animalia
- Phylum: Mollusca
- Class: Gastropoda
- Superorder: Hygrophila
- Family: Lymnaeidae
- Genus: Radix
- Species: R. natalensis

Binomial name
- Radix natalensis (Krauss, 1848)

Synonyms
- See list

= Radix natalensis =

Species of gastropod

Radix natalensis is a species of freshwater snail, an aquatic gastropod mollusc in the family Lymnaeidae.

This species occurs widely in Africa. It is a major intermediate host for Fasciola gigantica in Africa. Placement of this species in the genus Radix was confirmed by Correa et al. (2010).

== Distribution ==
Radix natalensis is a widespread species in Africa, occurring from northern Africa to southern Africa:

- Northern Africa: Algeria, Tunisia, Egypt, Sudan. There are also findings of distribution of Radix natalensis in Algeria 8–10,000 years ago. In Egypt it has been detected in water bodies of the Nile Delta.
- Western Africa: Benin, Burkina Faso, Côte d'Ivoire, Gambia, Ghana, Guinea, Guinea-Bissau, Liberia, Mali, Niger, Nigeria and Senegal,
- Eastern Africa: Burundi, Djibouti, Eritrea, Ethiopia, Kenya, Malawi, Mozambique, Somalia, Tanzania, Uganda, Zambia and Zimbabwe.
- Central Africa: Angola, Cameroon, Central African Republic, Chad, Democratic Republic of the Congo, Republic of the Congo, Equatorial Guinea and Gabon.
- Southern Africa: Botswana, Namibia, South Africa and Zimbabwe.
- Madagascar

The type locality is in "pools in Port Natal", which today is Durban, South Africa.

== Description ==
Radix natalensis was described by the German scientist and traveller Christian Ferdinand Friedrich Krauss in 1848.

The shape of the shell is elongate ovoid. The shell is colorless or light brown in color. The height of the aperture covers about 3/4 of the shell height. The lip of the aperture is thin and sharp. The umbilicus is closed. The width of the shell is about 5.75–7 mm. The height of the shell is 4.6–19.2 mm.

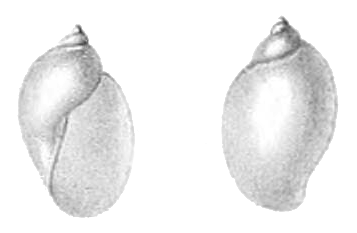
Drawing of apertural and abapertural view of the shell of Radix natalensis from its original description by Christian Ferdinand Friedrich Krauss in 1848.

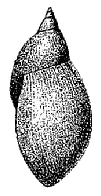
Drawing of lateral view of the shell.

The reproductive system and radula was described by Wright (1963) in detail.

== Ecology ==
Radix natalensis lives in permanent water bodies. They prefer clear, slow-running water with low salinity and abundant vegetation. An estimated density of Radix natalensis in a natural habitat in Tanzania was 34 snails per m². The snails lived mainly in the shallow water in depths of 0–4 cm, mainly between 20–30 cm from the shoreline. They prefer plant detritus or bedrock as a substrate.

Laboratory experiments have shown that some larger snails of Radix natalensis can survive on a wooden surface without water for up to 21 days. Some smaller snails of Radix natalensis have survived desiccation on a soil surface up to 60 days on "black" soil. Some smaller snails of Radix natalensis were able to survive for up to 90 days on soil among sedges (Cyperus) or in the "black" soil exposed to sun or in the soil with stones.

== Parasites ==
This species has been found to be an intermediate host of both Fasciola hepatica and Fasciola gigantica. Overall, rates of snail infection vary between 10% and 40%. The highest infection rate was found to be in summer and this may be a factor responsible for lowering snail density in this season. Parasites of Radix natalensis include:

- Fasciola hepatica
- Fasciola gigantica
- Trichobilharzia sp.
- some cercaria from Echinostomatidae
- some xiphidiocercaria from Plagiorchiidae
- four trematode larvae in Zambia

Predators of Radix natalensis include leeches Helobdella nilae and Alboglossiphonia conjugata.

Snails of the non-indigenous species Marisa cornuarietis eliminated Radix natalensis and other two native snail species from a small pond in Tanzania in an experiment in 1982.

Oil extract of the gum myrrh Commiphora myrrha has molluscicidal activity against Radix natalensis.

== Phylogeny ==
A cladogram shows the phylogenic relations of species in the genus Radix:

- Radix
  - - Radix labiata
    - - Radix peregra
      - - Radix ampla
        - Radix lagotis
  - - - Radix auricularia
      - Radix ovata
    - - Radix sp. from Philippines
      - - Radix sp. from Canada and Radix sp. from Romania
        - - - Radix natalensis
            - Radix luteola
          - - Radix quadrasi
            - Radix rubiginosa

== Synonyms ==
- Limnaea (Biformiana) cameroni Bourguignat, 1890 (a junior synonym)
- Limnaea (Biformiana) kynganica Bourguignat, 1890 (a junior synonym)
- Limnaea (Biformiana) zanzibarica Bourguignat, 1890 (a junior synonym)
- Limnaea (Limosiana) alexandrina Bourguignat, 1883 (a junior synonym)
- Limnaea (Limosiana) alexandrina var. gracilis Bourguignat, 1883 (a junior synonym)
- Limnaea (Raffrayana) raffrayi Bourguignat, 1883
- Limnaea (Stagnaliana) caillaudi Bourguignat, 1883 (a junior synonym)
- Limnaea acroxa Bourguignat, 1883 (a junior synonym)
- Limnaea aethiopica Bourguignat, 1883 (a junior synonym)
- Limnaea africana Bourguignat, 1883
- Limnaea africana var. azaouadensis Germain, 1909 (a junior synonym)
- Limnaea africana var. elata Germain, 1919 (a junior synonym)
- Limnaea africana var. gouidimouniensis Germain, 1916 (basionym)
- Limnaea africana var. kambaensis Germain, 1911 (a junior synonym)
- Limnaea africana var. kouloaensis Germain, 1911 (a junior synonym)
- Limnaea anceyana Preston, 1910 (a junior synonym)
- Limnaea arabica E. A. Smith, 1894
- Limnaea benguellensis Morelet, 1867 (original combination)
- Limnaea bocageana Morelet, 1867 (a junior synonym)
- Limnaea caillaudi Bourguignat, 1883(a junior synonym)
- Limnaea chudeaui Germain, 1907 (a junior synonym)
- Limnaea damarana O. Boettger, 1910 (junior subjective synonym)
- Limnaea debaizei Bourguignat, 1887 (a junior synonym)
- Limnaea electa E. A. Smith, 1882 (a junior synonym)
- Limnaea elmeteitensis E.A. Smith, 1894 (a junior synonym)
- Limnaea gravieri Bourguignat, 1885
- Limnaea hovarum Tristram, 1863 (a junior synonym)
- Limnaea humerosa E. von Martens, 1897 (a junior synonym)
- Limnaea jouberti Bourguignat, 1888 (a junior synonym)
- Limnaea kempi Preston, 1912 (junior synonym)
- Limnaea laurenti Bourguignat, 1888 (a junior synonym)
- Limnaea lavigeriana Bourguignat, 1888 (a junior synonym)
- Limnaea natalensis F. Krauss, 1848 (superseded combination)
- Limnaea nyansae E. von Martens, 1892 (a junior synonym)
- Limnaea orophila Morelet, 1864 (junior synonym)
- Limnaea suarezensis Dautzenberg, 1895 (a junior synonym)
- Limnaea undussumae E. von Martens, 1897 (a junior synonym)
- Limnaea undussumae var. courteti Germain, 1904 (a junior synonym)
- Limnaea vignoni Germain, 1909 (a junior synonym)
- Limnaeus auricularius var. ribeirensis Reibisch, 1865 (a junior synonym)
- Limnaeus benguellensis Morelet, 1867 (a junior synonym)
- Limnaeus bocageanus Morelet, 1867 (a junior synonym)
- Limnaeus dakaensis Sturany, 1898
- Limnaea perrieri Bourguignat, 1881
- Limnaea raffrayi Bourguignat, 1883
- Lymnaea vatonnei Bourguignat, 1868
- Lymnaea (Radix) natalensis
- Limnaeus natalensis Krauss, 1848
  - Limnaeus natalensis var. exsertus von Martens, 1866 (junior synonym)
