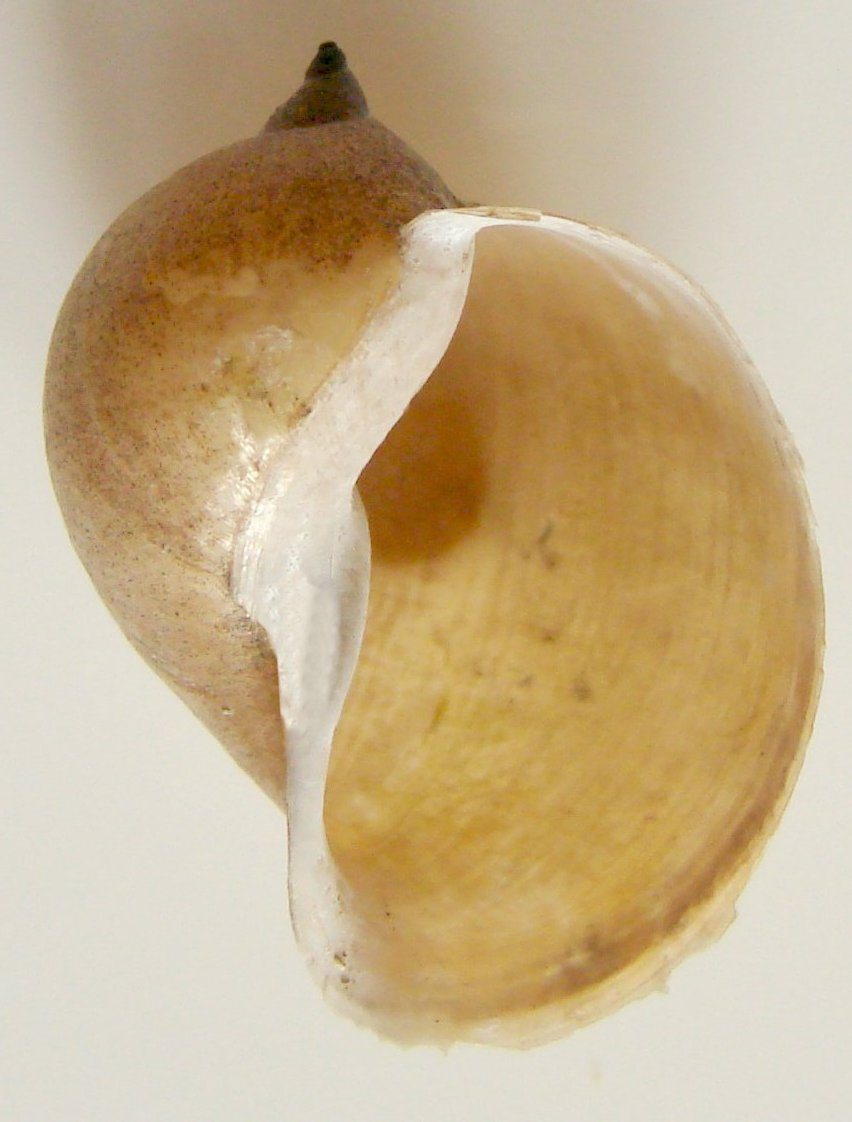
- A shell of Radix auricularia

Scientific classification
- Kingdom: Animalia
- Phylum: Mollusca
- Class: Gastropoda
- Superorder: Hygrophila
- Family: Lymnaeidae
- Genus: Radix; Montfort, 1810

Type species
- Radix auriculatus Montfort, 1810

Synonyms
- Auriculariana Servain, 1881; Gulnaria Turton, 1831; Limnaea (Radix) Montfort, 1810 (genus-subgenus combination not accepted); Lymnaea (Peregriana) Servain, 1881; Lymnaea (Radix) Montfort, 1810 (genus-subgenus combination not accepted); Neritostoma H. Adams & A. Adams, 1855; Radix (Peregriana) Servain, 1881; Radix (Radix) Montfort, 1810

= Radix (gastropod) =

Genus of gastropods

Radix is a genus of air-breathing freshwater snails, aquatic pulmonate gastropods in the family Lymnaeidae, the pond snails.

The genus Radix has a Palaearctic distribution.

== Phylogeny ==
Correa et al. (2010) confirmed that the placement of these species within the genus Radix reflected their phylogenetic relationship. A cladogram showing phylogenic relations of species in the genus Radix:

- Radix
  - - Radix labiata
    - - Radix peregra
      - - Radix ampla
        - Radix lagotis
  - - - Radix auricularia
      - Radix ovata
    - - Radix sp. from Philippines
      - - Radix sp. from Canada and Radix sp. from Romania
        - - - Radix natalensis
            - Radix luteola
          - - Radix quadrasi
            - Radix rubiginosa

The haploid number of chromosomes of all species in the genus Radix is 17 (n=17).

== Species ==
The taxonomic status of certain species in the genus Radix has been disputed. Remigio (2002) reported sequence divergence within the 16S mitochondrial gene of Radix peregra and Radix ovata. Furthermore, the shell morphology and alloenzyme data indicated that Radix peregra and Radix ovata are distinct.

In contrast, Bargues et al. (2001) considered, on the basis of ITS-2 sequence analysis, that R. peregra, R. ovata, and R. balthica are in fact conspecific.

- † Radix (Lytostoma) grammica (Brusina, 1872)
- Radix acuminata (Lamarck, 1822)
- † Radix alta Macaleț, 2000
- † Radix alutae (Jekelius, 1932)
- † Radix amaradica Macaleț, 2000
- Radix ampla (Hartmann, 1821)
- Radix andersoniana (Nevill, 1881)
- Radix auricularia (Linnaeus, 1758) - type species
  - Radix auricularia japonica Jay, 1857 - at Japanese Wikipedia
- Radix bactriana (Annandale & Prashad, 1919)
- † Radix balatonica (Fuchs, 1870)
- Radix balthica (Linnaeus, 1758)
- † Radix berbestiensis Macaleț, 2000
- † Radix bogdanensis Macaleț, 2000
- Radix brevicauda (G. B. Sowerby II, 1872)
- † Radix calavardensis (Bukowski, 1896)
- † Radix croatica (Gorjanović-Kramberger, 1890)
- † Radix cucuronensis (Fontannes, 1878)
- † Radix dilatata (Noulet, 1854)
- † Radix dilleri (Neumayr, 1883)
- † Radix enzenbachensis Neubauer & Harzhauser in Harzhauser et al., 2014
- † Radix extensa (Gorjanović-Kramberger, 1890)
- Radix gebleri (Middendorff, 1851)
- Radix gedrosiana (Annandale & Prashad, 1919)
- Radix hordeum (Mousson, 1874)
- Radix hubrechti Qian, Yang & He, 2012
- † Radix impressa (Sinzov, 1875)
- Radix iranica (Annandale & Prashad, 1919)
- † Radix jaksici (Brusina, 1902)
- Radix jordii Altaba, 2007
- Radix kamtschatica (Middendorff, 1851)
- † Radix kobelti (Brusina, 1884)
- † Radix korlevici (Brusina, 1884)
- † Radix kurelaci (Brusina, 1902)
- Radix labiata (Rossmässler, 1835)
- † Radix laevigata (Eichwald, 1853)
- Radix lagotis (Schrank, 1803)
- † Radix lazarevici (Brusina, 1902)
- Radix lilli Glöer & Beckmann, 2007
- Radix linae Altaba, 2007
- Radix luteola (Lamarck, 1822)
- † Radix lytostomopsis (Brusina, 1902)
- † Radix macaleti Neubauer, Harzhauser, Kroh, Georgopoulou & Mandic, 2014
- † Radix marinescui Macaleț, 2000
- † Radix minutissima (Greppin, 1855)
- Radix namucuoensis Qian, Yang & He, 2012
- Radix natalensis (Krauss, 1848)
- † Radix navarroi (Royo Gómez, 1922)
- † Radix novorossica (Sinzov, 1877)
- † Radix obtusissima (Deshayes, 1838)
- Radix ovata (Draparnaud, 1805) = Radix balthica (Linnaeus, 1758)
- † Radix papaianopoli Macaleț, 2000
- † Radix paucispira (Fuchs, 1870)
- Radix peregra (O. F. Müller, 1774) = Radix labiata (Rossmässler, 1835)
- † Radix pergamenica (Oppenheim, 1919)
- Radix persica (Issel, 1865)
- † Radix phrygoovata (Oppenheim, 1919)
- Radix pinteri Schütt, 1974
- † Radix plicata (Sacco, 1884)
- † Radix podarensis Macaleț, 2000
- † Radix pseudoovata (d'Orbigny, 1852)
- Radix relicta Polinski, 1929
- † Radix rippensis (Almera & Bofill y Poch, 1895)
- Radix rubiginosa (Michelin, 1831)
- Radix rufescens (Gray, 1822)
- † Radix simplex (Gorjanović-Kramberger, 1899)
- † Radix socialis (von Zieten, 1832)
- † Radix subauricularia (d'Orbigny, 1852)
- † Radix subinflata (d'Orbigny, 1852)
- † Radix sublimosa (Sinzov, 1875)
- † Radix subovata (von Zieten, 1832)
- † Radix zelli (Hörnes, 1856)

Or instead perhaps:

- R. peregra = R. ovata = R. balthica

Taxa inquirenda

- Radix middendorffi (W. Dybowski, 1903)

Species brought into synonymy

- Radix (Radix) dupuyana (Noulet, 1854): synonym of † Galba dupuyiana (Noulet, 1854)
- † Radix (Radix) hyaloleuca (Brusina, 1902): synonym of † Radix korlevici (Brusina, 1884)
- † Radix (Radix) limosa (Linnaeus, 1758): synonym of Radix balthica (Linnaeus, 1758)
- † Radix (Radix) peregra (Müller, 1774): synonym of Radix labiata (Rossmässler, 1835)
- Radix auriculatus Montfort, 1810: synonym of Radix auricularia (Linnaeus, 1758)
- Radix altus Macaleț, 2000: synonym of † Radix alta Macaleț, 2000
- † Radix amaradicus Macaleț, 2000: synonym of † Radix amaradica Macaleț, 2000
- Radix deydieri (Fontannes, 1878): synonym of † Radix cucuronensis (Fontannes, 1878)
- † Radix hyaloleuca (Brusina, 1902): synonym of † Radix korlevici (Brusina, 1884)
- † Radix kuzmici (Brusina, 1897): synonym of † Boskovicia kuzmici Brusina, 1897
- Radix ovata (Draparnaud, 1805): synonym of Radix balthica (Linnaeus, 1758)
- † Radix peregra (O. F. Müller, 1774): synonym of Radix labiata (Rossmässler, 1835)
- † Radix socialis Macaleț, 2000: synonym of † Radix macaleti Neubauer, Harzhauser, Kroh, Georgopoulou & Mandic, 2014

== Parasites ==
Species within the genus Radix are utilized as intermediate hosts by several different trematode species:

- Trichobilharzia spp.
- Fasciola hepatica
- Fasciola gigantica
- Fascioloides magna
- Plagiorchis neomidis
- Haplometra cylindracea
- Echinostoma spp.
