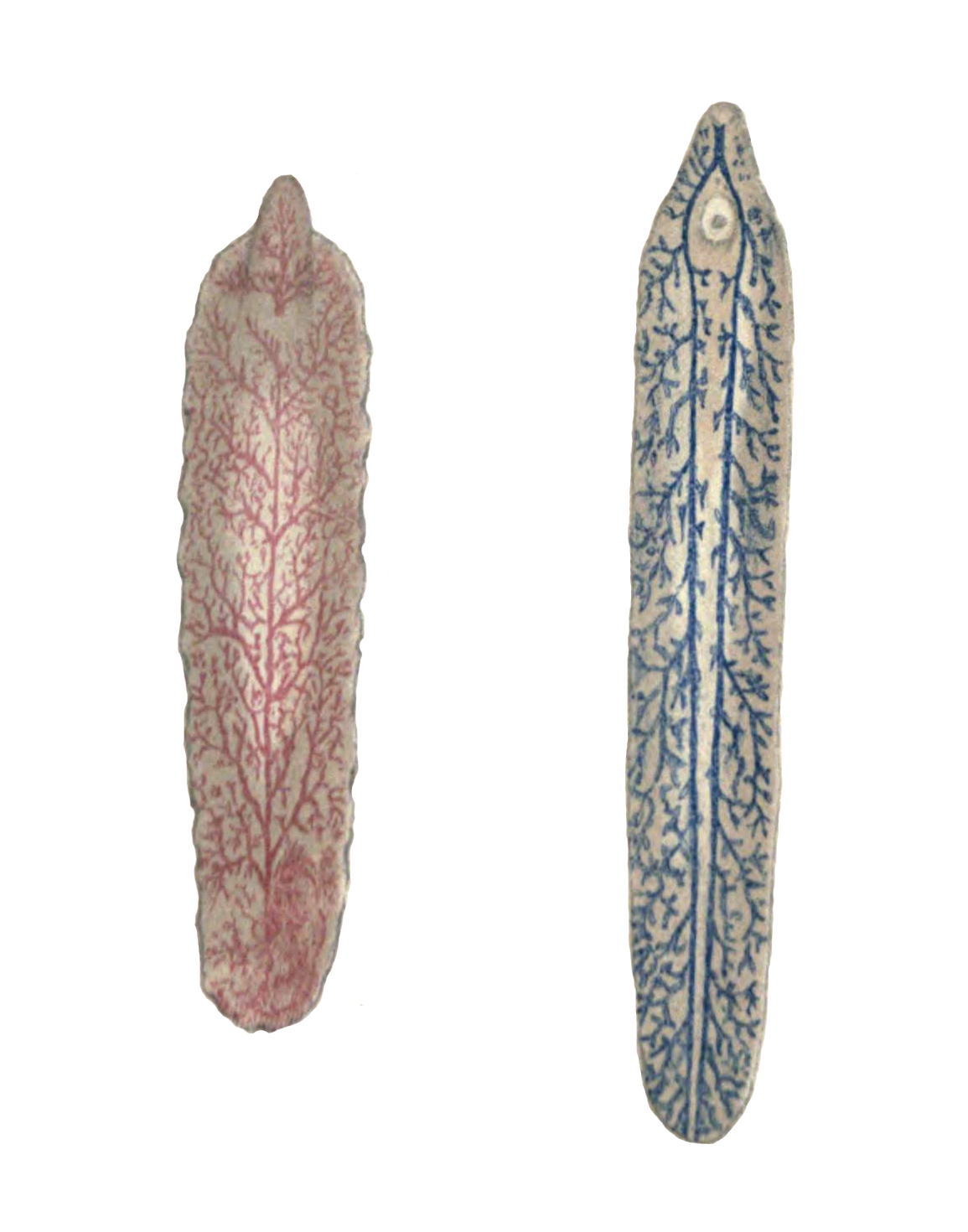
- Cobbold's drawings of dorsal (left) and ventral views of Fasciola gigantica

Scientific classification
- Kingdom: Animalia
- Phylum: Platyhelminthes
- Class: Trematoda
- Order: Plagiorchiida
- Family: Fasciolidae
- Genus: Fasciola
- Species: F. gigantica

Binomial name
- Fasciola gigantica Cobbold, 1855

= Fasciola gigantica =

Species of fluke

Fasciola gigantica is a parasitic flatworm of the class Trematoda, which causes tropical fascioliasis. It is regarded as one of the most important single platyhelminth infections of ruminants in Asia and Africa. The infection is commonly called fasciolosis.

The prevalence of F. gigantica often overlaps with that of Fasciola hepatica, and the two species are so closely related in terms of genetics, behaviour, and morphological and anatomical structures that distinguishing them is notoriously difficult. Therefore, sophisticated molecular techniques are required to correctly identify and diagnose the infection.

== Distribution ==
Fasciola gigantica causes outbreaks in tropical areas of South Asia, Southeast Asia, and Africa. The geographical distribution of F. gigantica overlaps with F. hepatica in many African and Asian countries and sometimes in the same country, although in such cases, the ecological requirement of the flukes and their snail hosts are distinct. Infection is most prevalent in regions with intensive sheep and cattle production. In Egypt, F. gigantica has existed in domestic animals since the times of the pharaohs.

== Lifecycle ==
The lifecycle of F. gigantica is: Eggs (transported with feces) → egg hatch → miracidium → miracidium infect snail intermediate host → (parthenogenesis in 24 hours) sporocyst → redia → daughter redia → cercaria → (gets outside the snail) → metacercaria → infection of the host → adult stage produces eggs.

=== Intermediate hosts ===
As with other trematodes, Fasciola spp. develop in a molluscan intermediate host. Species of the freshwater snails from the family Lymnaeidae are well known for their role as intermediate hosts in the lifecycle of F. gigantica; however, throughout the years, an increasing number of other molluscan intermediate hosts of F. gigantica have been reported. The lymnaeid intermediate hosts of F. gigantica are distinguishable from those of F. hepatica, both morphologically and as to habitat requirement. The species of Fasciola can become adapted to new intermediate hosts under certain conditions at least based on laboratory trials. The most important intermediate host for F. gigantica is Radix auricularia. However, other species are also known to harbour the fluke, including Lymnaea rufescens and Lymnaea acuminata in the Indian subcontinent; Radix rubiginosa and Radix natalensis in Malaysia and Africa, respectively; and the synonymous Lymnaea cailliaudi in East Africa. Other snails also serve as natural or experimental intermediates, such as Austropeplea ollula, Austropeplea viridis, Radix peregra, Radix luteola, Pseudosuccinea columella, and Galba truncatula. The Australian Lymnaea tomentosa (host of F. hepatica) was shown to be receptive to miracidia of F. gigantica from East Africa, Malaysia, and Indonesia.

=== Definitive hosts ===
F. gigantica is a causative agent (together with F. hepatica) of fascioliasis in ruminants and in humans worldwide.

The parasite commonly infects cattle and buffalo, and can also be seen regionally in goats and sheep, and in nonruminants (donkeys).

== Infection and pathogenicity ==
Infection with Fasciola spp. occurs when metacercariae are accidentally ingested on raw vegetation. The metacercariae exist in the small intestine, and move through the intestinal wall and peritoneal cavity to the liver, where adults mature in the biliary ducts of the liver. Eggs are passed through the bile ducts into the intestine, where they are then passed in the feces.

== Diagnosis ==
Despite the importance to differentiate between the infection by either fasciolid species, due to their distinct epidemiological, pathological, and control characteristics, unfortunately, coprological (excretion-related) or immunological diagnoses are difficult. Especially in humans, specific detection by clinical, pathological, coprological, or immunological methods are unreliable. Molecular assays are the only promising tools, such as PCR-RFLP assay, and the very rapid loop-mediated isothermal amplification (LAMP).

== Treatment ==
Triclabendazole is the drug of choice in fasciolosis, as it is highly effective against both mature and immature flukes. Artemether has been demonstrated in vitro to be equally effective. Though slightly less potent, artesunate is also useful in human fasciolosis.
