= Hypoderaeum conoideum =

Scientific classification
- Domain: Eukaryota
- Kingdom: Animalia
- Phylum: Platyhelminthes
- Class: Trematoda
- Order: Plagiorchiida
- Family: Echinostomatidae
- Genus: Hypoderaeum
- Species: H. conoideum

Binomial name
- Hypoderaeum conoideum (Block, 1872) Diez, 1909

Species of fluke

Hypoderaeum conoideum is a species of digenetic trematodes in the family Echinostomatidae.

The known first intermediate hosts of Hypoderaeum conoideum include the freshwater snails Planorbarius corneus, Indoplanorbis exustus, Lymnaea stagnalis, Lymnaea limosa, Radix ovata and Radix rubiginosa.

Other freshwater snail species were capable of being experimentally infected: Lymnaea tumida, Radix peregra and Stagnicola corvus.
