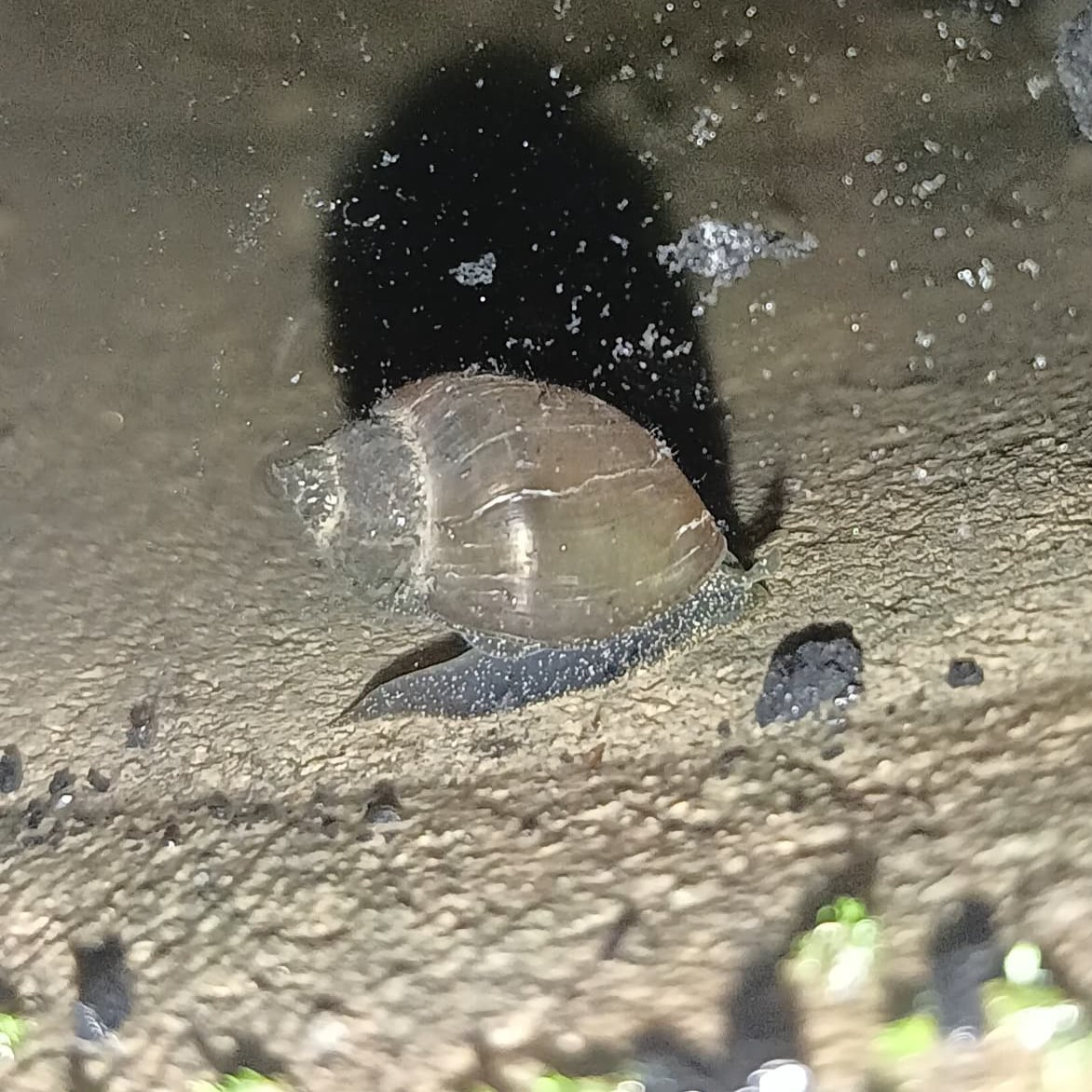

Conservation status
- Least Concern (IUCN 3.1)

Scientific classification
- Kingdom: Animalia
- Phylum: Mollusca
- Class: Gastropoda
- Superorder: Hygrophila
- Family: Lymnaeidae
- Genus: Radix
- Species: R. rufescens

Binomial name
- Radix rufescens (Gray, 1822)

= Radix rufescens =

Species of gastropod

Radix rufescens is a species of freshwater snail in the family Lymnaeidae. It is native to South Asia, where it occurs in Bangladesh, Burma, India, Nepal, and Pakistan. There it is a widespread and common species.

== Biology ==
This snail lives in water bodies such as lakes, streams, and wetlands with thick vegetation. It easily survives in polluted waters.

== Parasites ==
Radix rufescens is a host for many species of trematodes. It is the first intermediate host for Schistosoma nasale and S. spindale. It is also an intermediate host for the liver flukes Fasciola gigantica and F. hepatica, which cause the infectious disease fasciolosis in humans and other mammals.

== Reproduction ==
Freshwater snails reproduce in a variety of ways, including asexually, sexually, and hermaphroditically Asexual reproduction Some freshwater snails can reproduce asexually, meaning they can lay and fertilize their own eggs. For example, pond snails can reproduce asexually, but they also prefer to reproduce sexually. Sexual reproduction In some species, males fertilize females through direct copulation. For example, mystery snails are sexually dimorphic, meaning they have separate males and females that must pair up to reproduce. Hermaphroditic reproduction Some freshwater snails are hermaphrodites, meaning they have both male and female reproductive organs. Hermaphroditic snails may reproduce sexually or asexually, depending on the species and conditions. Males fertilize females through copulation. Females lay their eggs in clumps on firm, clean surfaces like rocks, logs, or aquatic vegetation. The eggs hatch after a period of time that depends on the species and environmental factors.

== Egg laying ==
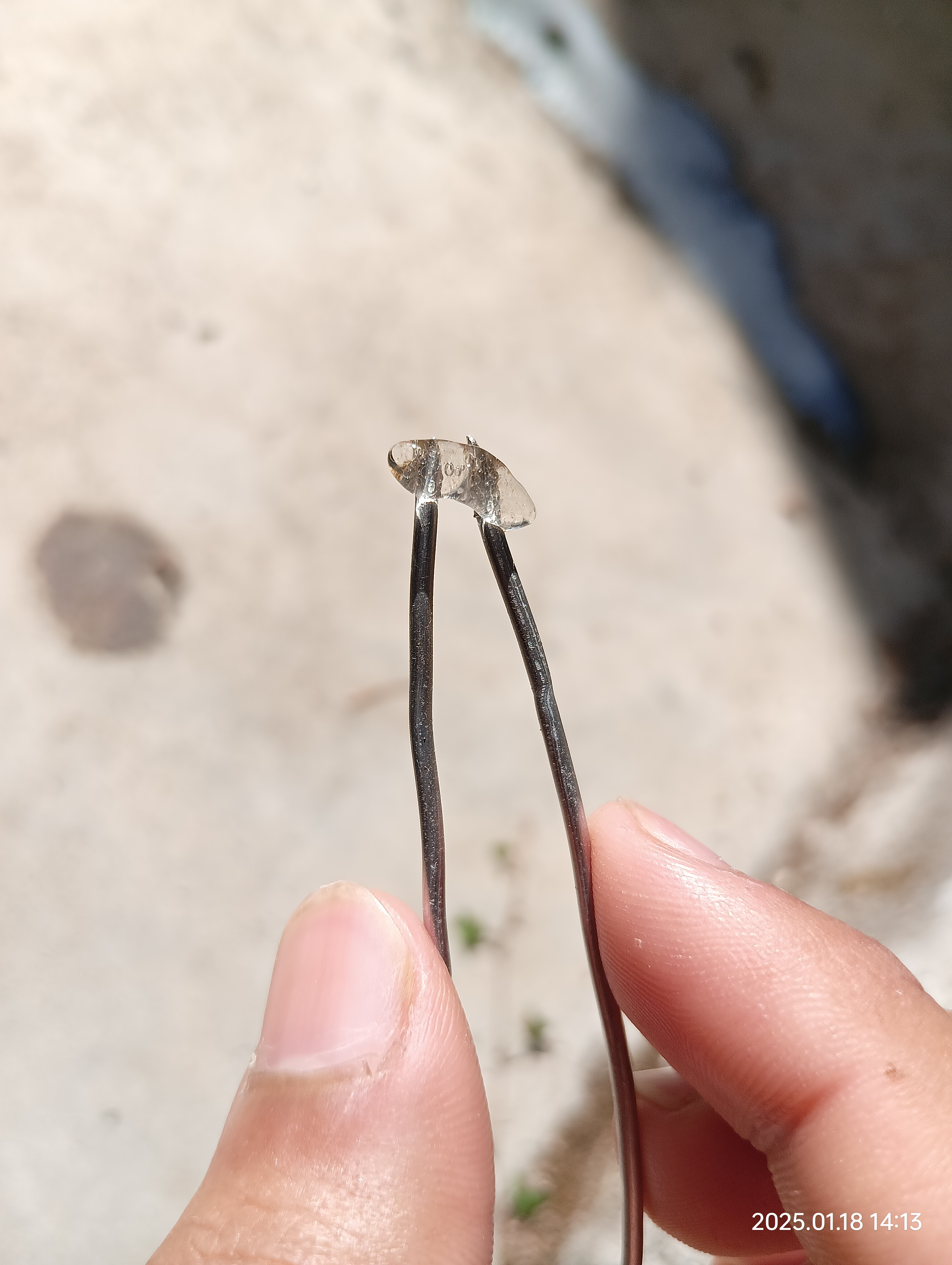
a singular egg-sac compared to a human finger

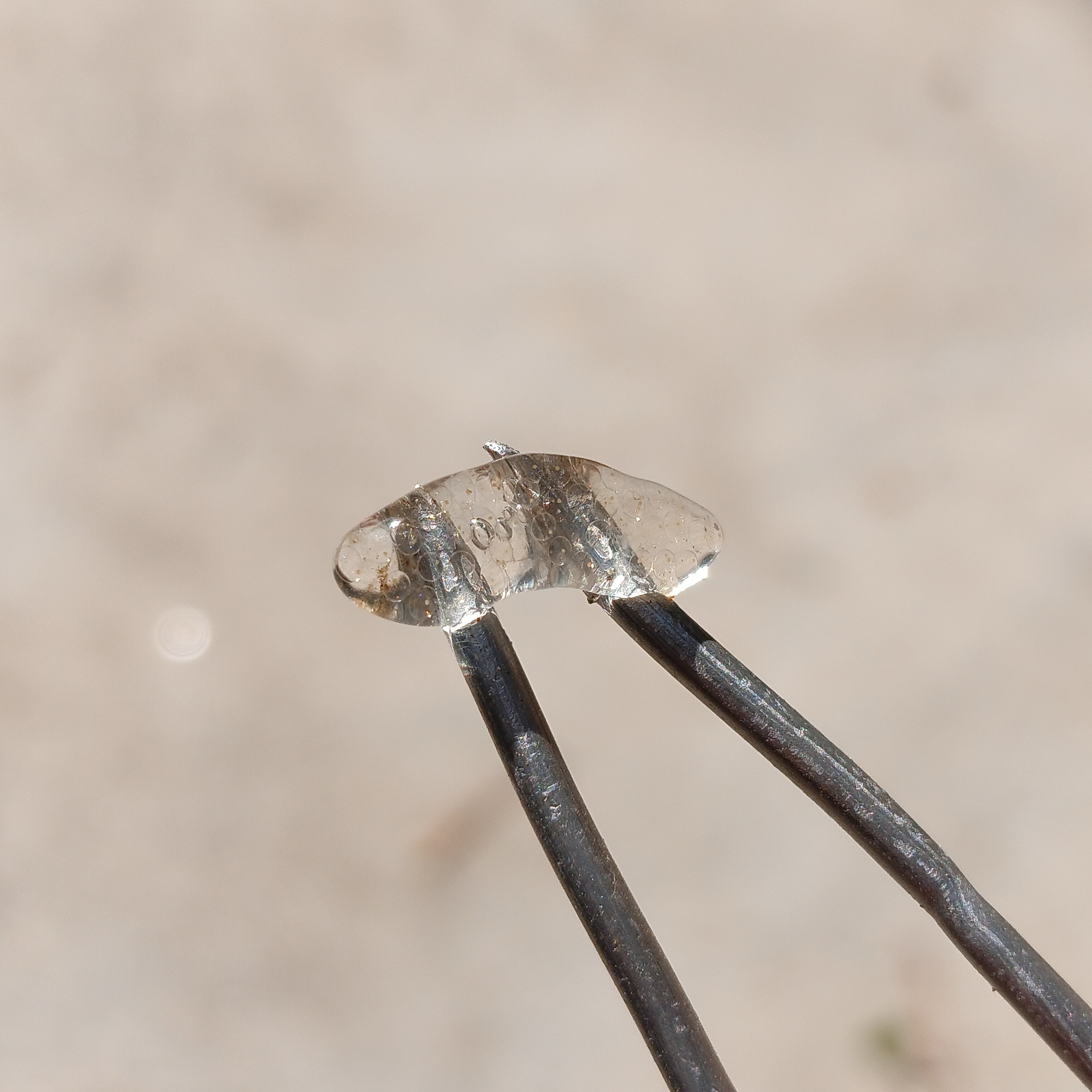
visible undeveloped embroyo (only 5 days old)

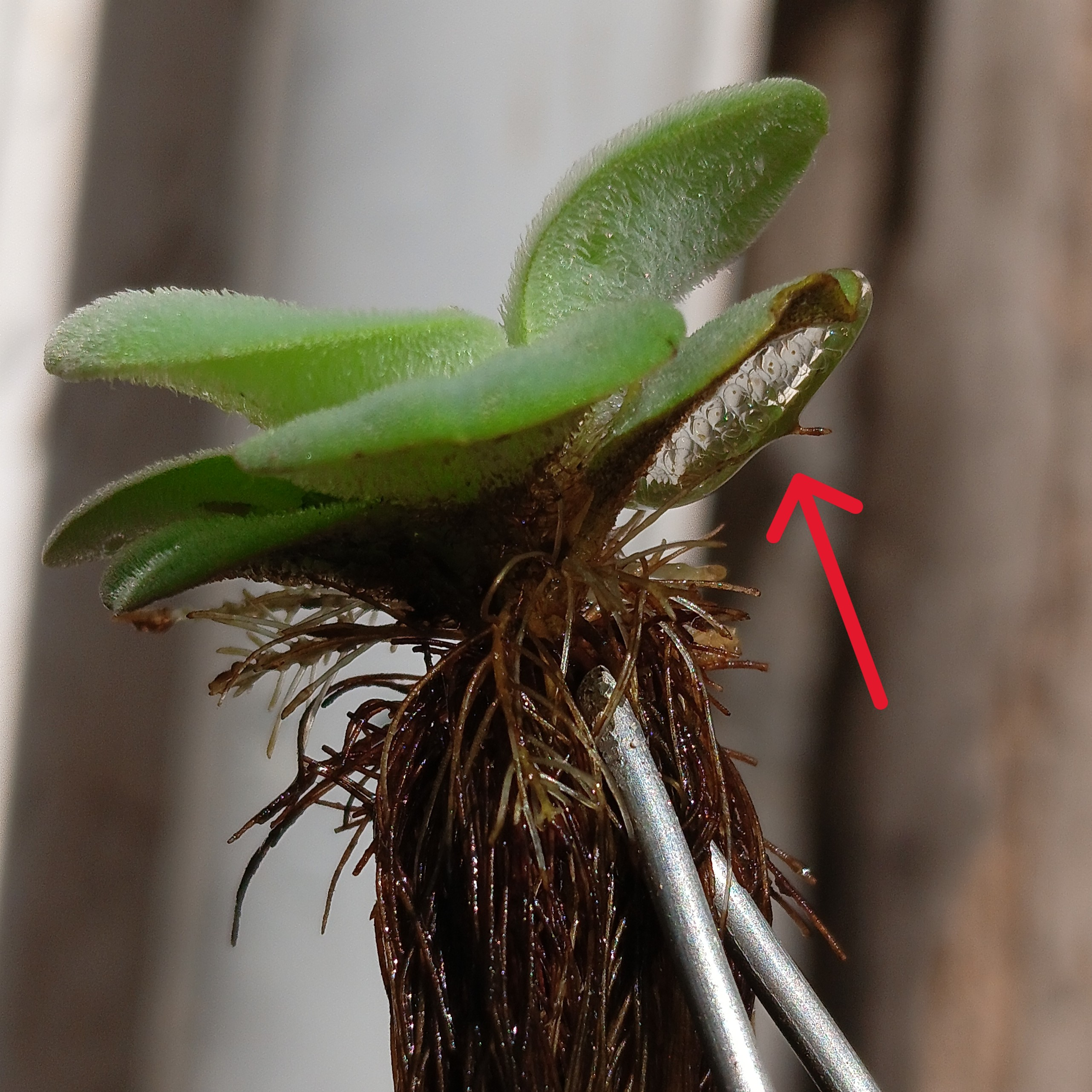
A acuminata egg-sac attached under a water-lettuce leaf

Freshwater snails reproduce by laying eggs in clumps, which are usually attached to plants or other surfaces in the water. The eggs hatch after a period of time that depends on the species and environmental factors. Snails can lay eggs multiple times a year, sometimes as often as once or more each month. The eggs hatch after 1 to 5 weeks, depending on the species and environmental factors.
