= Galician goat =

Breed of goat

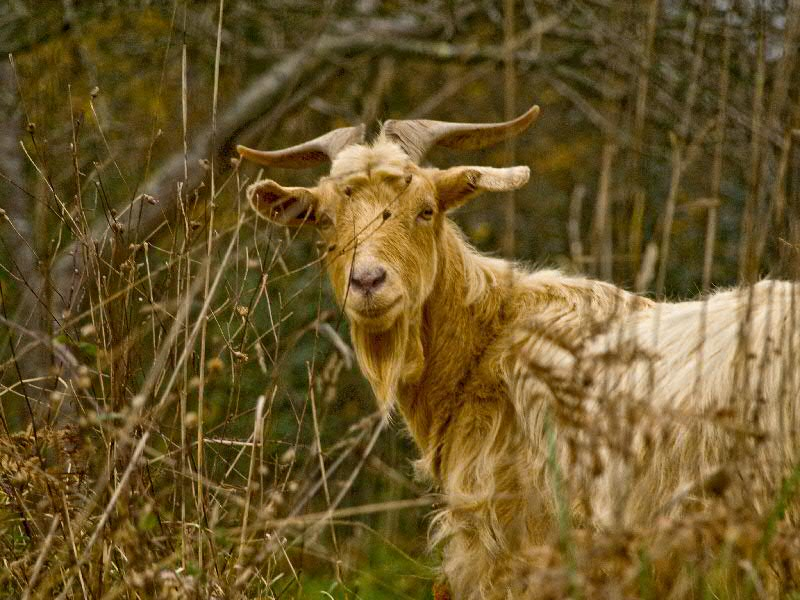
Galician nanny

The Galician goat is a breed of goat (Capra aegagrus hircus) of Galician origin. In 2012, there were 622 goats (514 female and 108 male) in the herd as a whole, spread across 64 farms. They are very well-adapted to their environment, and, according to Invesaga (Animal Health Research of Galicia), they have a better immune resistance to the common liver worm than other types of goat.

== Geographic spread ==
Generally, members of this breed of goat are spread across mountainous areas, largely in the provinces of Lugo and Ourense.

== Morphology ==
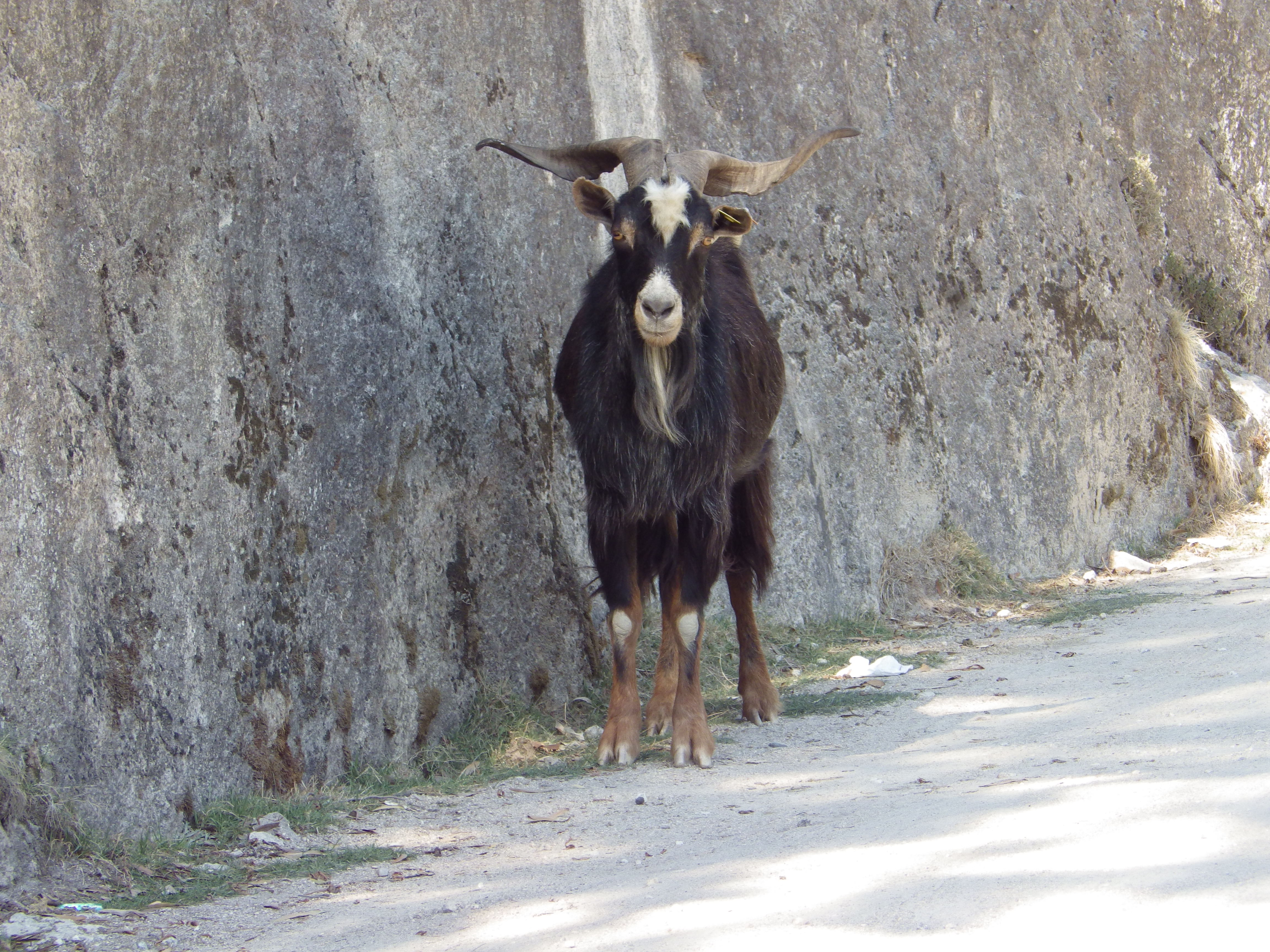
Galician billy

They are horned animals, of straight or concave profile, and with a great degree of sexual dimorphism. Their coat is of a single colour: mahogany or blonde, and with slight extra characterisations. In contests, it is considered a disadvantage if there are white marks on it.

== See also ==
- List of goat breeds
