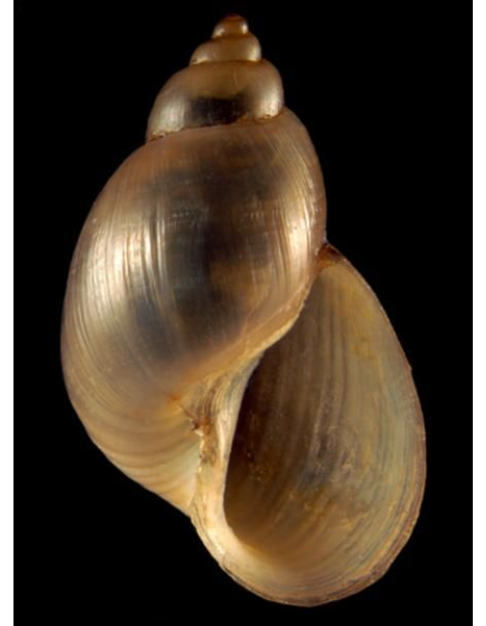
- Shell of Orientogalba viridis (specimen at the Australian Museum)

Conservation status
- Least Concern (IUCN 3.1)

Scientific classification
- Kingdom: Animalia
- Phylum: Mollusca
- Class: Gastropoda
- Superorder: Hygrophila
- Family: Lymnaeidae
- Genus: Orientogalba
- Species: O. viridis

Binomial name
- Orientogalba viridis (Quoy & Gaimard, 1832)

Synonyms
- Austropeplea viridis (Quoy & Gaimard, 1832) superseded combination; Galba viridis (Quoy & Gaimard, 1832); Limnaea blaisei Dautzenberg & Fischer, 1905 (a junior synonym); Limnaea crassiuscula Bavay, 1906 (a junior synonym); Limnaeus philippinensis Mousson, 1886 (a junior synonym); Limnaeus volutatus A. A. Gould, 1847 junior subjective synonym; Limnea volutata A. A. Gould, 1847 junior subjective synonym; Lymnaea (Pseudisidora) volutata A. A. Gould, 1847 junior subjective synonym; Lymnaea (Radix) viridis Quoy & Gaimard, 1832; Lymnaea minor W. H. Benson, 1842 (a junior synonym); Lymnaea viridis Quoy & Gaimard, 1832 (original combination); Radix viridis (Quoy & Gaimard, 1832)

= Orientogalba viridis =

Species of gastropod

Orientogalba viridis is a species of air-breathing freshwater snail, an aquatic pulmonate gastropod mollusk in the family Lymnaeidae, the pond snails.

== Distribution ==
This species occurs in:

- Russian Federation: Kuril Islands
- Japan
- South Korea
- China and Hong Kong
- Nepal
- Myanmar
- Thailand
- Vietnam – it widely distributed in northern, central, and southern Vietnam.
- Indonesia (Papua)
- Papua New Guinea
- Philippines
- Guam

The nonidigenous distribution of this species includes:

- Australia

== Description ==
The shell has 4.5–5 whorls.

The shape of the aperture is regularly oval. The width of the aperture is 3–4 mm. The height of the aperture is 5–6 mm.

The width of the shell is 4–6 mm. The height of the shell is 10–13 mm.

(Described in Latin as Limnea volutata) The shell is small, very finely striated, and tawny in color, possessing a cylindrically ovate shape. The spire is decollated, with only two to three oblique, slightly convex whorls remaining. The suture is moderate in depth. The aperture is ovate and exceeds half the total length of the shell, while the columella is reddish and strongly sinuous.

== Habitat ==
Orientogalba viridis was found in rice fields, ditches, small canals, and submerged vegetable fields.

== Parasites ==
Parasites of Orientogalba viridis include:

- Orientocreadium batrachoides
- Fasciola hepatica
- In Vietnam, Austropeplea viridis serves as an intermediate host for the trematode Fasciola gigantica.
