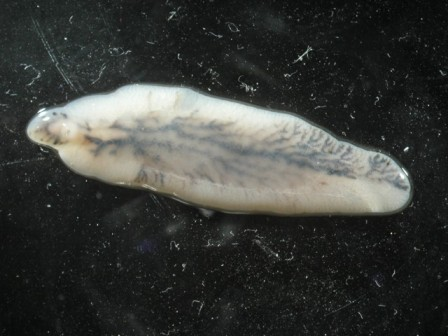
- Fasciola hepatica

Scientific classification
- Kingdom: Animalia
- Phylum: Platyhelminthes
- Class: Trematoda
- Order: Plagiorchiida
- Family: Fasciolidae
- Genus: Fasciola; Linnaeus, 1758

= Fasciola =

Genus of flukes

Fasciola, commonly known as the liver fluke, is a genus of parasitic trematodes. There are three species within the genus Fasciola: Fasciola nyanzae, Fasciola hepatica and Fasciola gigantica. Fasciola hepatica and F. gigantica are known to form hybrids. Both F. hepatica and F. gigantica and their hybrids infect the liver tissue of a wide variety of mammals, including humans, in a condition known as fascioliasis. F. hepatica measures up to 30 mm by 15 mm, while F. gigantica measures up to 75 mm by 15 mm. Fasciola nyanzae is thought to exclusively infect the common hippopotamus, Hippopotamus amphibius.

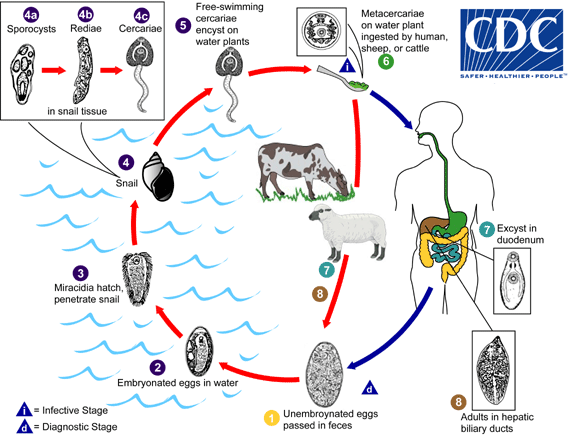
Life Cycle of Fasciola

== Species ==
- Fasciola nyanzae Leiper, 1910
- Fasciola hepatica Linnaeus, 1758
- Fasciola gigantica Cobbold, 1855
- Hybrid or introgressed populations of Fasciola gigantica × Fasciola hepatica

== Life cycle ==
Fasciola pass through five phases in their life cycle: egg, miracidium, cercaria, metacercaria, and adult fluke. The eggs are passed in the feces of mammalian hosts and, if they enter freshwater, the eggs hatch into miracidia. Miracidia are free-swimming. The miracidia then infect gastropod intermediate hosts and develop into cercariae, which erupt from the body of the snail host and find and attach to aquatic plants. The cercariae then develop into metacercarial cysts. When these cysts are ingested along with the aquatic plants by a mammalian host, they mature into adult flukes and migrate to the bile ducts. The adults can live for 5–10 years in a mammalian host.

== Animal hosts ==
The intermediate hosts, where Fasciola reproduce asexually, are gastropods from the family Lymnaeidae, also known as pond snails.

A wide variety of mammals can be definitive hosts, where Fasciola reach adulthood and reproduce, including pigs, rodents, ruminants, and humans. The most important animal reservoir hosts for human infections are sheep and cattle.

== Geographic distribution ==
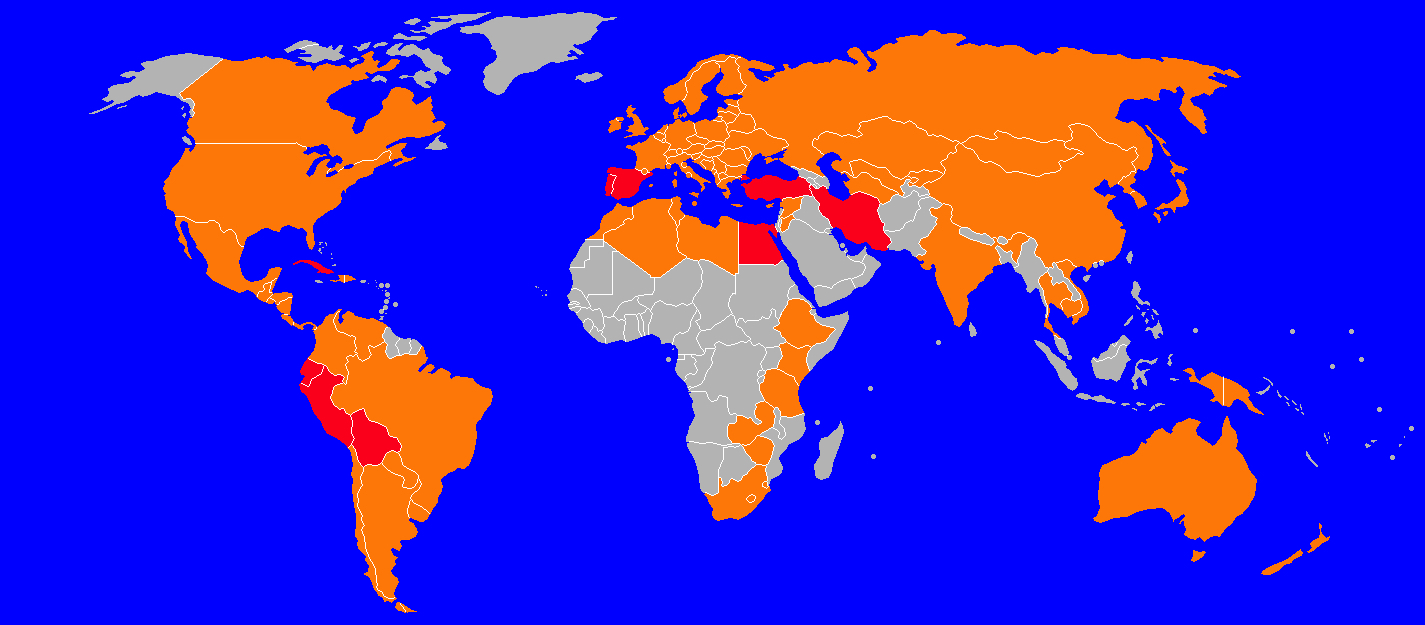
Range of F. hepatica

Fasciola are widespread and inhabit 70 countries and parts of all continents except for Antarctica. It is most common in areas with sheep and cattle are raised. The regions most impacted by Fasciola are the northern Andes and the Mediterranean region.

== History and discovery ==
Evidence of fascioliasis in humans exists dating back to Egyptian mummies that have been found with Fasciola eggs. Cercariae of F. hepatica in a snail and flukes infecting sheep were first observed in 1379 by Jehan De Brie. The life cycle and hatching of an egg were first described in 1803 by Zeder.

== Prevention and treatment ==
Fascioliasis is treated with triclabendazole. There is no vaccine for Fasciola currently available. In severe cases of biliary tract obstruction, surgery is an option to remove adult flukes.

The most common way that humans are infected is through the consumption of undercooked vegetables, often watercress, that are contaminated with metacercariae. This is of particular concern in areas where animal waste is used as fertilizer for the cultivation of watercress, as the full life cycle of Fasciola can sustained while contaminating crops intended for human consumption. Additionally, in rare cases, ingestion of the raw liver of an infected animal can lead to infection. This is primarily in the Middle East and is known as halzoun.

One prevention method is to kill off the snail hosts in a water body using molluscicides. Another method is treating entire communities that are at risk for contracting fascioliasis with triclabendazole. This is a time efficient method in impoverished rural communities, as it does not require testing the entire community for fascioliasis.
