= Fh8 =

Protein from parasite

Fh8 is a small calcium-binding sensor protein produced by the liver fluke Fasciola hepatica. This parasite infects human and animals, and may lead to death. This protease is a very small one, 8 kDa, as is produced and secreted by the parasite during the infection process through liver. This protein has been tested and used as a fusion tag to improve the solubilization and expression of recombinant proteins, due to its biochemical characteristics.
