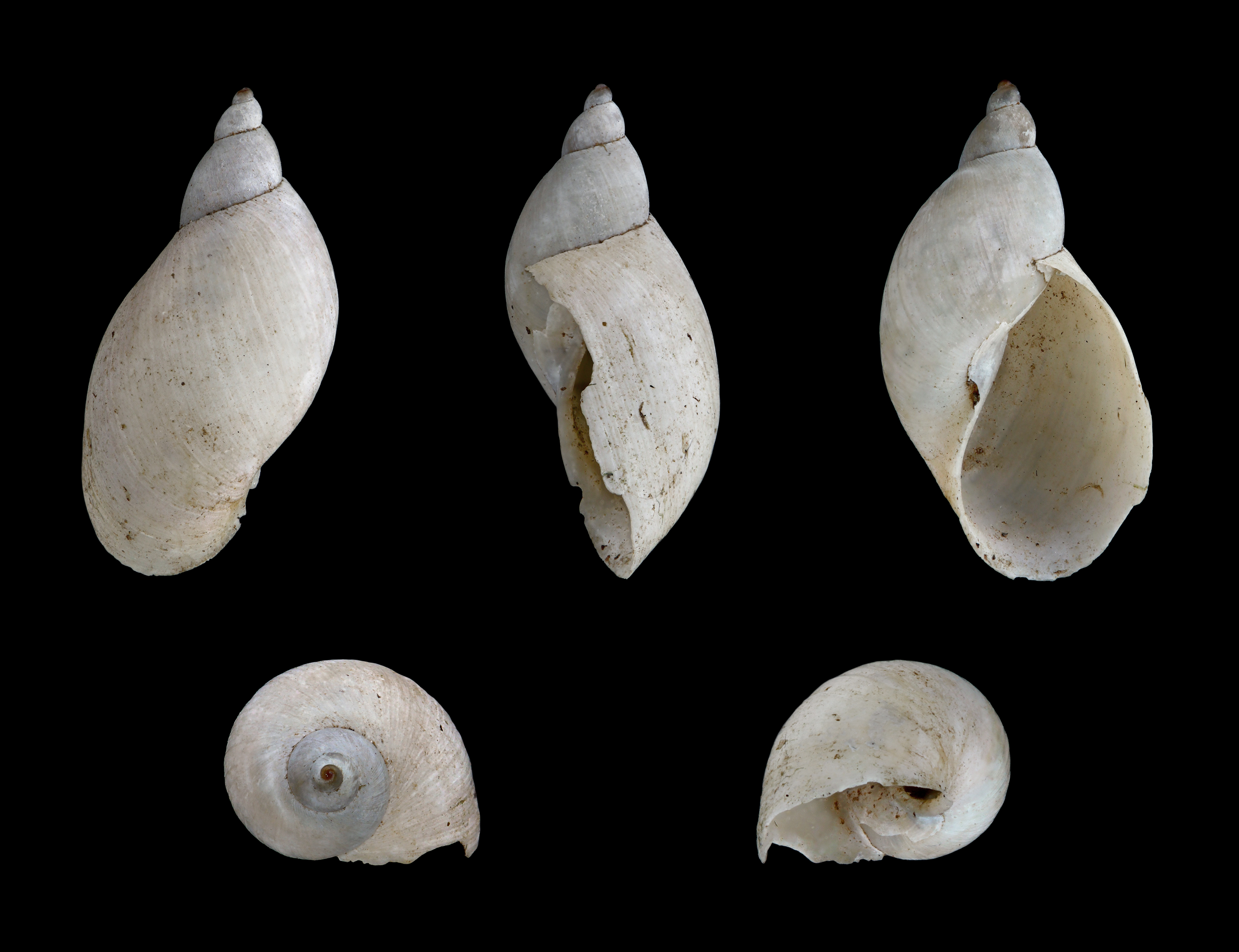

Conservation status
- Secure (NatureServe)

Scientific classification
- Kingdom: Animalia
- Phylum: Mollusca
- Class: Gastropoda
- Superorder: Hygrophila
- Family: Lymnaeidae
- Genus: Pseudosuccinea
- Species: P. columella

Binomial name
- Pseudosuccinea columella (Say, 1817)

Synonyms
- Lymnaea columella Say, 1817; Lymnaea ubaquensis Piaget, 1914

= Pseudosuccinea columella =

Species of gastropod

Pseudosuccinea columella, the American ribbed fluke snail, is a species of air-breathing freshwater snail, an aquatic pulmonate gastropod mollusk in the family Lymnaeidae, the pond snails.

This snail is an intermediate host for Fasciola hepatica, the liver fluke, a parasite of livestock, especially sheep.

== Distribution ==
=== Indigenous ===
Pseudosuccinea columella is native to North America. and Europe. The indigenous distribution of Pseudosuccinea columella reaches from New Brunswick and south Manitoba throughout the eastern US to Central and South America.

The exact type locality for this species is unknown, but it is somewhere in the Philadelphia area, US.

=== Introduced ===
This snail has been introduced to Australia and Europe.

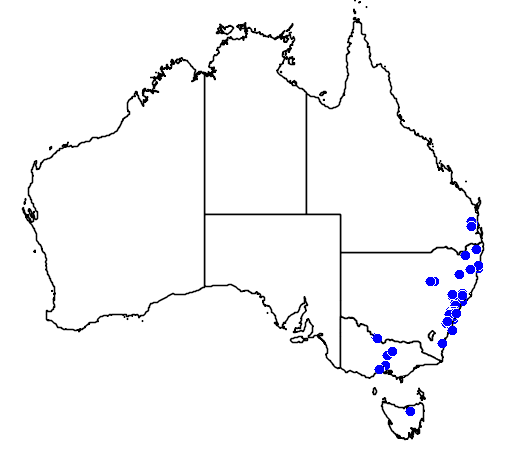
Distribution map for Australia where it is an introduced species

The non-indigenous distribution of Pseudosuccinea columella includes:

- western US (distribution map in the US)
- Puerto Rico
- Venezuela
- Brazil: Rio Grande do Sul
- Argentina
- Australia
- South Africa – since 1942
- Zimbabwe
- other countries in Africa
- Pacific islands

Europe:

- Switzerland (Basel)
- Austria (Villach)
- Hungary
- Greece (Nómos Florina)
- Menorca (a Spanish island)
- France – in the wild
- Portugal, Madeira Island – in the wild
- Czech Republic as a "hothouse alien"
- Latvia as a "hothouse alien"

== Description ==
The shell quite closely resembles shells in the genus Succinea, which belongs to a different family.

The shell of Pseudosuccinea columella is horny brown, thin, translucent, fragile and very finely striated. The apex is pointed. The shell has 3.5–4 weakly convex whorls with a shallow suture. The last whorl predominates. The aperture is ovate. The upper palatal margin descends steeply. The columellar margin is reflected only at its upper section; the lower columellar margin sharp and straight.

The width of the shell is 8–13 mm. The height of the shell is 15–20 mm.

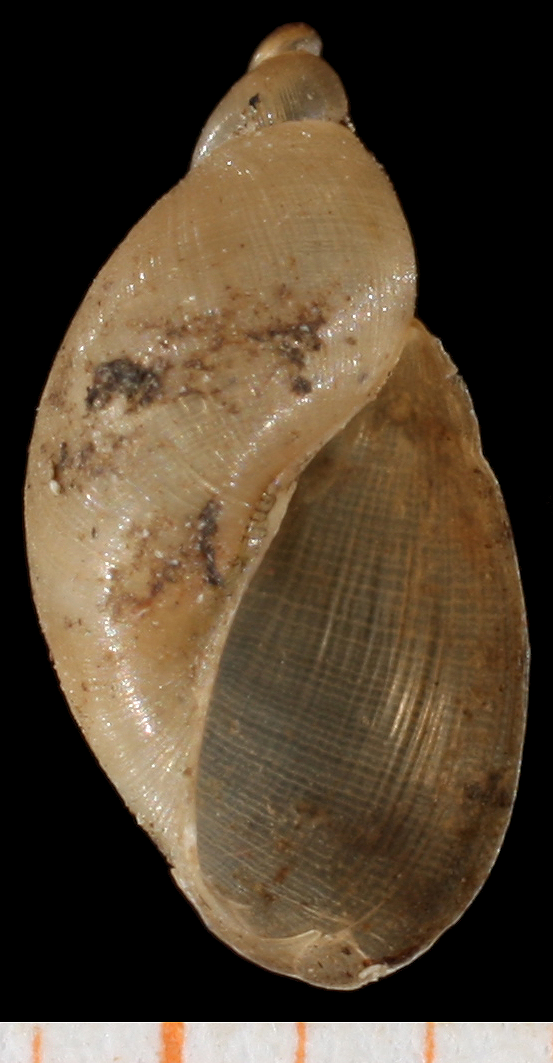
Apertural view of the shell

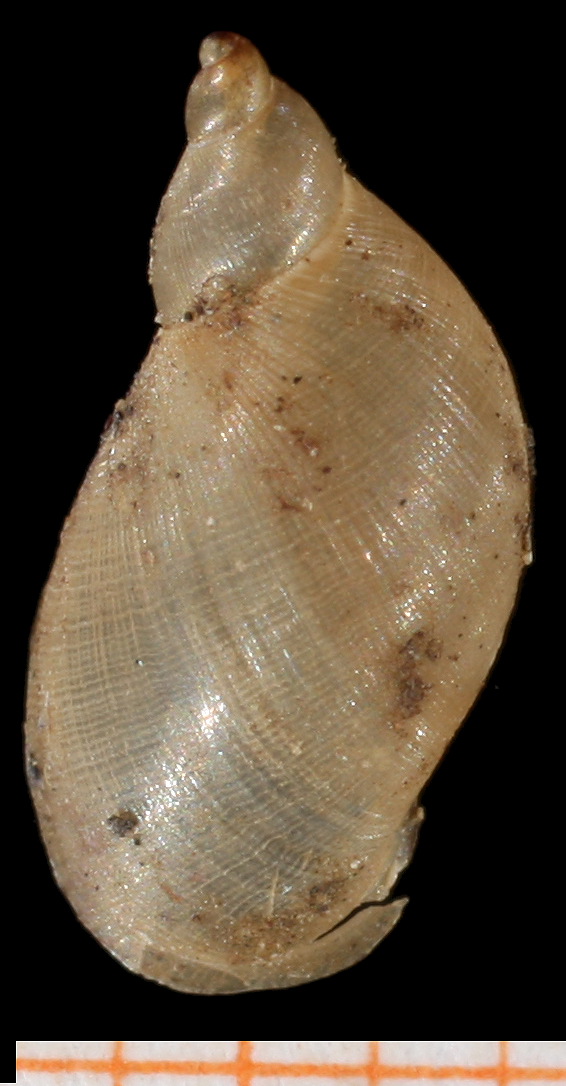
Abapertural view of the shell

The animal is dusky with whitish spots. The eyes are small and black and are located at the inner base of the tentacles.

The haploid number of chromosomes is 18 (n=18).

== Habitat ==
In North America, Pseudosuccinea columella lives in stagnant waters, at the edges of lakes, ponds, muddy and sluggish streams, among lily pads and reeds on sticks and mud.

In Europe it occurs predominantly in greenhouses, but also sometimes in outdoor habitats (Austria, Hungary). It needs warm water and does not survive Central European winter temperatures. It is also found above the water on floating leaves of aquatic plants; in northern Greece it was found in a spring near a road.

== Parasites ==
Parasites of Pseudosuccinea columella include:

- In North America, Pseudosuccinea columella is major intermediate host of Fasciola hepatica.
- The species also serve as a snail host for Fascioloides magna.
- Also serves as host for Fasciola gigantica & Fasciola nyanzae
- Also serves as a host for the cercariae of the trematode Telorchis sp.
