= Radix jordii =

Scientific classification
- Domain: Eukaryota
- Kingdom: Animalia
- Phylum: Mollusca
- Class: Gastropoda
- Superorder: Hygrophila
- Family: Lymnaeidae
- Genus: Radix
- Species: R. jordii

Binomial name
- Radix jordii Altaba, 2007

Species of gastropod

Radix jordii is a species of air-breathing freshwater snail, an aquatic pulmonate gastropod mollusk in the family Lymnaeidae, the pond snails.

== Distribution ==
This species occurs in the Balearic Islands.
