= Radix linae =

Scientific classification
- Domain: Eukaryota
- Kingdom: Animalia
- Phylum: Mollusca
- Class: Gastropoda
- Superorder: Hygrophila
- Family: Lymnaeidae
- Genus: Radix
- Species: R. linae

Binomial name
- Radix linae Altaba, 2007

Species of gastropod

Radix linae is a species of freshwater snail, a gastropod mollusk in the family Lymnaeidae.

== Distribution ==
- The Balearic Islands
