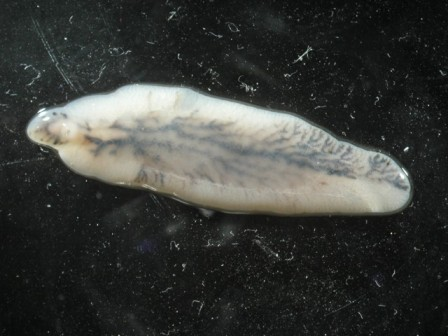
- Adult Fasciola hepatica specimen

Scientific classification
- Kingdom: Animalia
- Phylum: Platyhelminthes
- Class: Trematoda
- Order: Plagiorchiida
- Family: Fasciolidae
- Genus: Fasciola
- Species: F. hepatica

Binomial name
- Fasciola hepatica Linnaeus, 1758

= Fasciola hepatica =

Species of fluke

Fasciola hepatica, also known as the common liver fluke or sheep liver fluke, is a parasitic trematode (fluke or flatworm, a type of helminth) of the class Trematoda, phylum Platyhelminthes. It infects the livers of various mammals, including humans, and is transmitted by sheep and cattle to humans all over the world. The disease caused by the fluke is called fasciolosis or fascioliasis, which is a type of helminthiasis and has been classified as a neglected tropical disease. Fasciolosis is currently classified as a plant/food-borne trematode infection, often acquired through eating the parasite's metacercariae encysted on plants. F. hepatica, which is distributed worldwide, has been known as an important parasite of sheep and cattle for decades and causes significant economic losses in these livestock species, up to £23 million in the UK alone. Because of its relatively large size and economic importance, it has been the subject of many scientific investigations and may be the best-known of any trematode species. The closest relative of Fasciola hepatica is F. gigantica. These two flukes are sister species; they share many morphological features and can mate with each other.

== Life cycle ==
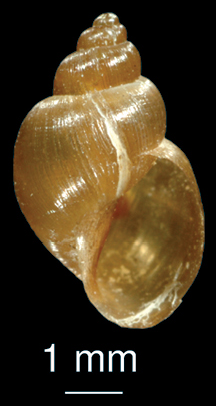
Galba truncatula, an amphibious freshwater lymnaeid snail that serves as the main intermediate host of Fasciola hepatica in Europe

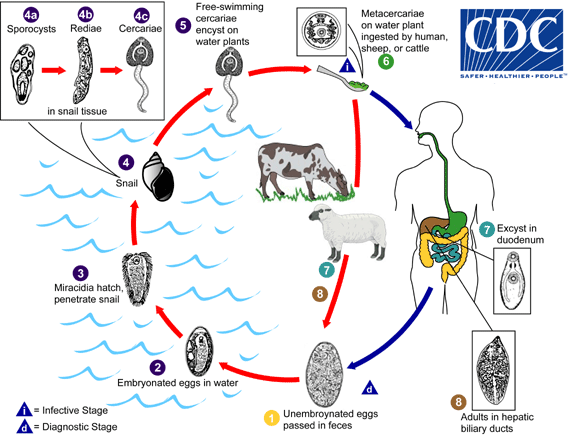
The lifecycle of Fasciola hepatica

Fasciola hepatica occurs in the liver and bile ducts of a definitive host and its lifecycle is indirect. Definitive hosts of the fluke are cattle, sheep and goats as well as water buffalo. Wild ruminants, such as African buffalo, and other mammals, including humans, can act as definitive hosts as well. Rabbits and hares can serve as wild life reservoirs. The life cycle of F. hepatica goes through the intermediate host and several environmental larval stages. Intermediate hosts of F. hepatica are air-breathing freshwater snails from the family Lymnaeidae. Although several lymnaeid species susceptible to F. hepatica have been described, the parasite develops only in one or two major species on each continent. Galba truncatula is the main snail host in Europe, partly in Asia, Africa, and South America. Lymnaea viator, L. neotropica, Pseudosuccinea columella, and L. cubensis are most common intermediate hosts in Central and South America. Several other lymnaeid snails may be naturally or experimentally infected with F. hepatica, but their role in transmission of the fluke is low. The list of lymnaeid snails that may serve as natural or experimental intermediate hosts of F. hepatica include:

- Orientogalba ollula (formerly Austropeplea ollula) (Gould, 1859)
- Austropeplea tomentosa
- Orientogalba viridis (formerly Austropeplea viridis) (Quoy & Gaimard, 1832)
- Fossaria bulimoides
- Galba truncatula
- Lymnaea cousini
- Lymnaea cubensis
- Lymnaea diaphana
- Lymnaea humilis
- Lymnaea neotropica
- Lymnaea occulta
- Lymnaea stagnalis
- Lymnaea viatrix
- Omphiscola glabra
- Pseudosuccinea columella
- Radix auricularia
- Radix lagotis
- Radix natalensis
- Radix peregra
- Radix rubiginosa
- Stagnicola caperata
- Stagnicola fuscus
- Stagnicola palustris
- Stagnicola turricula

The metacercariae are released from the freshwater snail as cercariae, and form cysts on various surfaces including aquatic vegetation. The mammalian host then eats this vegetation and can become infected. Humans can often acquire these infections through drinking contaminated water and eating freshwater plants such as watercress. Inside the duodenum of the mammalian host, the metacercariae are released from within their cysts. From the duodenum, they burrow through the lining of the intestine and into the peritoneal cavity. They then migrate through the intestines and liver, and into the bile ducts. Inside the bile ducts, they develop into an adult fluke. In humans, the time taken for F. hepatica to mature from metacercariae into an adult fluke is roughly three to four months. The adult flukes can then produce up to 25,000 eggs per fluke per day. These eggs are passed out via stools and into freshwater. Once in freshwater, the eggs become embryonated, allowing them to hatch as miracidia, which then find a suitable intermediate snail host of the Lymnaeidae family. Inside this snail, the miracidia develop into sporocysts, then to rediae, then to cercariae. The cercariae are released from the snail to form metacercariae and the life cycle begins again.

== Morphology and anatomy ==
Fasciola hepatica is one of the largest flukes of the world, reaching a length of 30 mm and a width of 13 mm (Fasciola gigantica, though, is even bigger and can reach up to 75 mm). It is leaf-shaped, pointed at the back (posteriorly), and wide in the front (anteriorly). The oral sucker is small but powerful and is located at the end of a cone-shape projection at the anterior end. The acetabulum is a larger sucker than the oral sucker and is located at the anterior end.

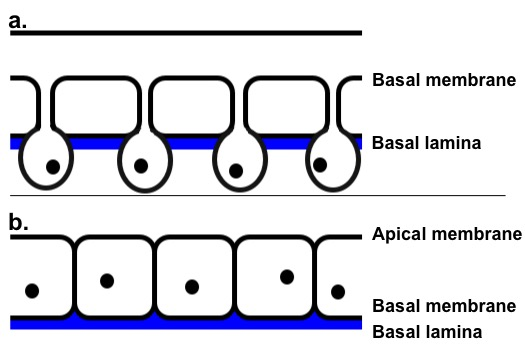
A simple diagram to show the difference between the teguments of free-living and parasitic flatworms: a. shows the syncytial epithelial tegument found in parasitic flatworms, such as F. hepatica. b. shows the multicellular, nonsyncytial, epithelia, found in nonparasitic, free-living flatworms.

=== Tegument ===
The outer surface of the fluke is formed by the tegument. This is composed of scleroprotein, and its primary function is to protect the fluke from the destructive digestive system of the host. It is enveloped in a glycocalyx. The tegument renews its plasma membrane as a protection against compromise and is modified to actively or passively uptake nutrients. The uptake of some compounds (e.g. taurine) makes flukes even more resistant to being killed by the digestive system of the host. On the surface of the tegument are also small spines. Initially, these spines are single-pointed, then, just prior to the fluke entering the bile ducts, they become multipointed. At the anterior end of the fluke, the spines have between 10 and 15 points, whereas at the posterior end, they have up to 30 points. The tegument is a syncytial epithelium. This means it is made from the fusion of many cells, each containing one nucleus, to produce a multinucleated cell membrane. In the case of F. hepatica, no nuclei are in the outer cytoplasm between the basal and apical membranes. Thus, this region is referred to as anucleate. Instead, the nuclei are found in the cell bodies, also known as tegumental cells, these connect to the outer cytoplasm via thin cytoplasmic strands. The tegumental cells contain the usual cytoplasmic organelles (mitochondria, Golgi bodies, and endoplasmic reticulum). The tegument plays a key role in the fluke's infection of the host. Studies have shown that certain parts of the tegument (in this case, the antigen named Teg) can actually suppress the immune response of the mammalian host. This means that the fluke is able to weaken the immune response, and increase its chances of a successful infection. A successful infection is needed for the fluke to have enough time to develop into an adult and continue its lifecycle.

=== Digestive system ===
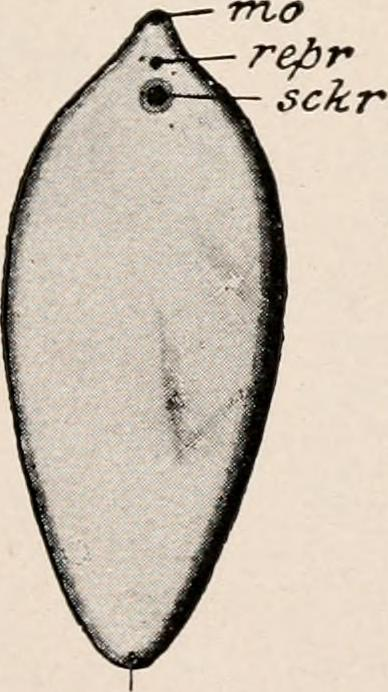
Image showing the location of the mouth, labelled mo, and the anterior sucker, as labelled sckr

The alimentary canal of F. hepatica has a single mouth which leads into the blind gut; it has no anus. The mouth is located within the anterior sucker on the ventral side of the fluke. This mouth leads to the pharynx, which is then followed by a narrow oesophagus. The oesophagus, which is lined with a thin layer of epithelial cells, then opens up into the large intestine. As no anus is present, the intestine branches, with each branch ending blindly near the posterior end of the body. Flukes migrate into smaller capillaries and bile ducts when feeding within the host. They use their mouth suckers to pull off and suck up food, bile, lymph, and tissue pieces from the walls of the bile ducts. F. hepatica relies on extracellular digestion which occurs within its intestine. The waste materials are egested through the mouth. The nonwaste matter is absorbed back in through the tegument and the general surface of the fluke. The tegument facilitates this absorption by containing many small folds to increase the surface area.

=== Respiratory system ===
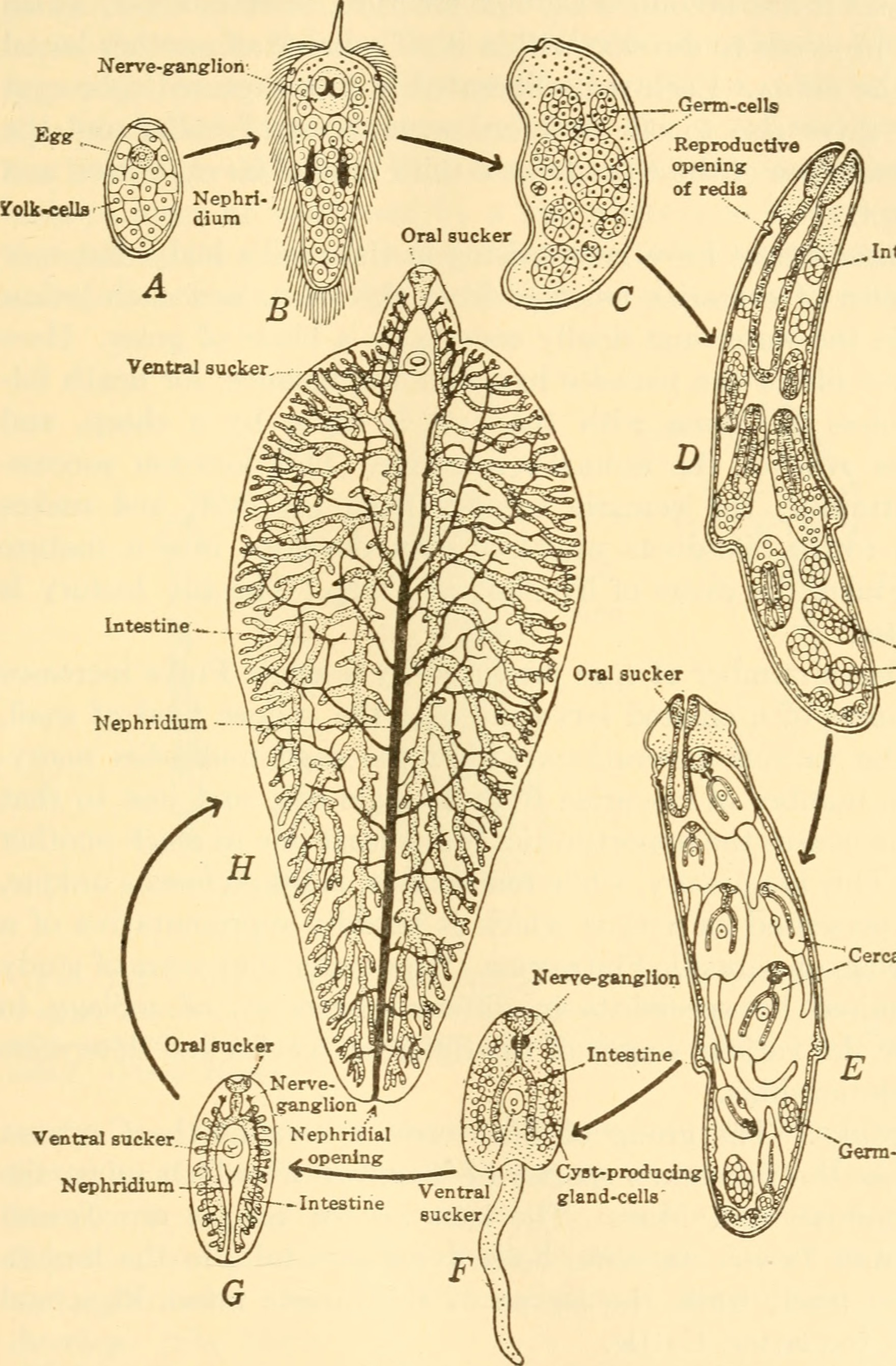
Diagram of the main organ systems of F. hepatica throughout the progressive life stages of the fluke (1938). A - egg; B - miracidium; C - sporocyst; D - rediae, E - immature cercaria, F - cercaria, G - encysted stage, H - adult fluke (nervous and reproductive systems omitted)

F. hepatica has no respiratory organs: the adult flukes respire anaerobically (without oxygen). Glycogen taken from within the host is broken down by glycolysis to produce carbon dioxide and fatty acids. This process provides the fluke with energy. In contrast, the free-living miracidia stages of the parasite generally develop within oxygen-rich environments. The free-living stages of the parasite are thought to respire aerobically, to gain the most energy from their environment.

=== Excretory system ===
The excretory system of F. hepatica contains a network of tubules surrounding one main excretory canal. This canal leads to the excretory pore at the posterior end of the fluke. This main canal branches into four sections within the dorsal and ventral regions of the body. The excretory system functions in excretion and osmoregulation. Each tubule within the excretory system is connected to a flame cell, otherwise known as protonephridia. These cells are modified parenchyme cells. In F. hepatica, their role is to perform excretion, but more importantly, osmoregulatory functions. Flame cells are therefore primarily used to remove excess water.

=== Nervous system and sensory organs ===
The nerve system of F. hepatica consists of a pair of nerve ganglia, each one is located on either side of the oesophagus. Around the oesophagus is a nerve ring, which connects the two nerve ganglia together. The nerves stem from this ring, reaching the posterior end of the body. At the posterior end, one pair of nerves becomes thicker than the others; these are known as the lateral nerve cords. From these lateral nerve cords, the other nerves branch. Sensory organs are absent from F. hepatica.

=== Reproductive system ===
F. hepatica adult flukes are hermaphrodite; each contains both male and female reproductive organs. The male and female reproductive organs open up into the same chamber within the body, which is called the genital atrium. The genital atrium is an ectodermal sac which opens up to the outside of the fluke via a genital pore. The testes are formed of two branched tubules, these are located in the middle and posterior regions of the body. From the epithelium lining of the tubules, sperm is produced. The sperm then passes into the vas deferens and then into the seminal vesicle. From the seminal vesicle projects the ejaculatory duct, and this opens into the genital atrium, and many prostate glands surround this opening. The right side of the anterior testis has a branched, tubular ovary. From here, a short oviduct passes to the vitelline duct. This duct connects, via a junction, the ovaries, the uterus, and the yolk reservoir. From this junction, the uterus opens into the genital atrium; this opening is surrounded by Mehlis glands. In some flukes, the terminal end of the uterus is strengthened with muscles and spines.

F. hepatica reproduces both sexually, via the hermaphrodite adult flukes, and asexually. The miracidia can reproduce asexually within the intermediate snail host.

=== Genome ===
With its draft genome sequence published in 2015, F. hepatica is known to have the largest nuclear genome size among trematodes so far sequenced. It is about 1.3 Gb, which is two times that of Opisthorchis viverrini with 634.5 Mb, the second largest genome among trematodes. The genome is contained in 10 pairs of chromosomes. The protein-coding sequence covers about 21.8 Mb and repetitive DNA sequence about 32% of the total genome. The number of genes predicted is 14,642. The mitochondrial genome consists of 14462 bp, containing 12 protein-encoding, 2 ribosomal and 22 transfer RNA genes.

== Prevalence ==
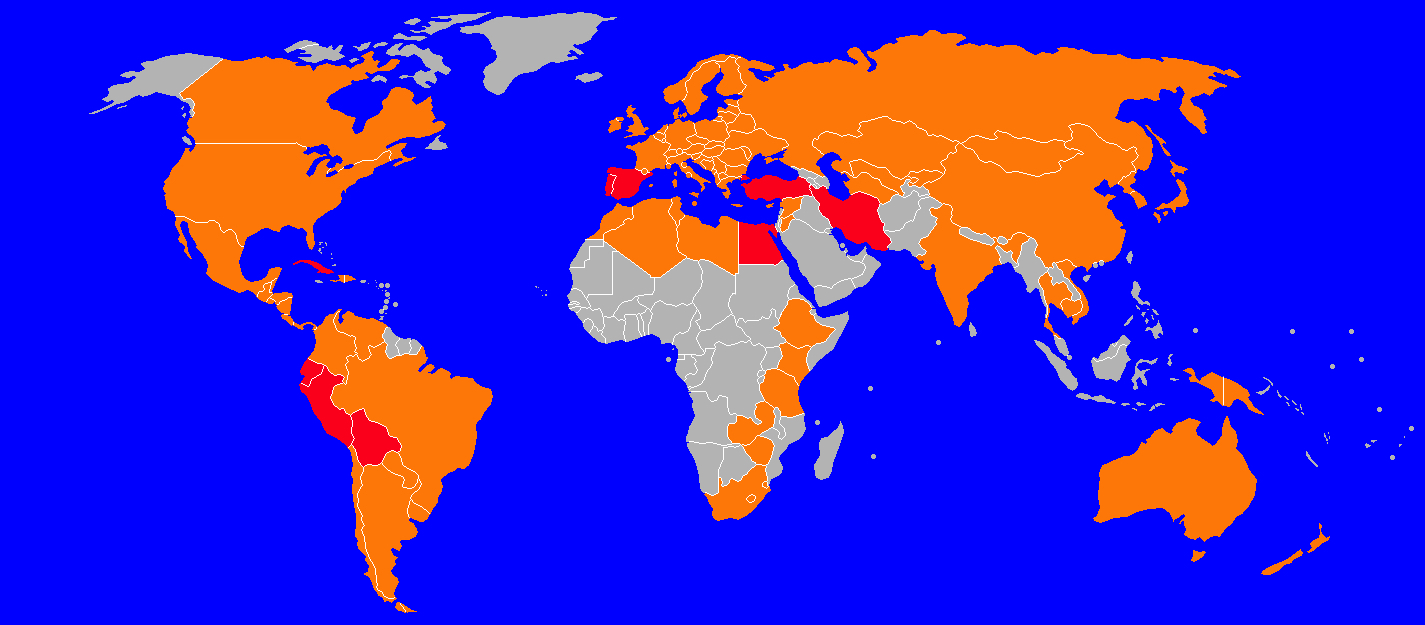
Fasciola hepatica prevalence. The countries in red are those with high prevalence, those in orange have low-medium prevalence.

Currently, F. hepatica has one of the widest geographical spread of any parasitic and vector-borne disease. Originating in Europe, it has expanded to colonize over 50 countries, covering all continents except Antarctica. In contrast, F. gigantica is generally considered more geographically restricted to the tropical regions of Africa, Asia, and the Middle East, with some overlap between the two species.

Climate affects both F. hepatica and its intermediate host, the snail. For example, the development of F. hepatica miracidia and larvae, and the reproduction of Galba truncatula, require a temperature range of 10 to 25 °C (50 to 77 °F). In addition, they both require high levels of moisture in the air, as both are at risk of desiccation. Due to this, the prevalence, along with the intensity of infection, of F. hepatica is primarily dependent on rainfall levels and temperature.

== Parasitic adaptations ==
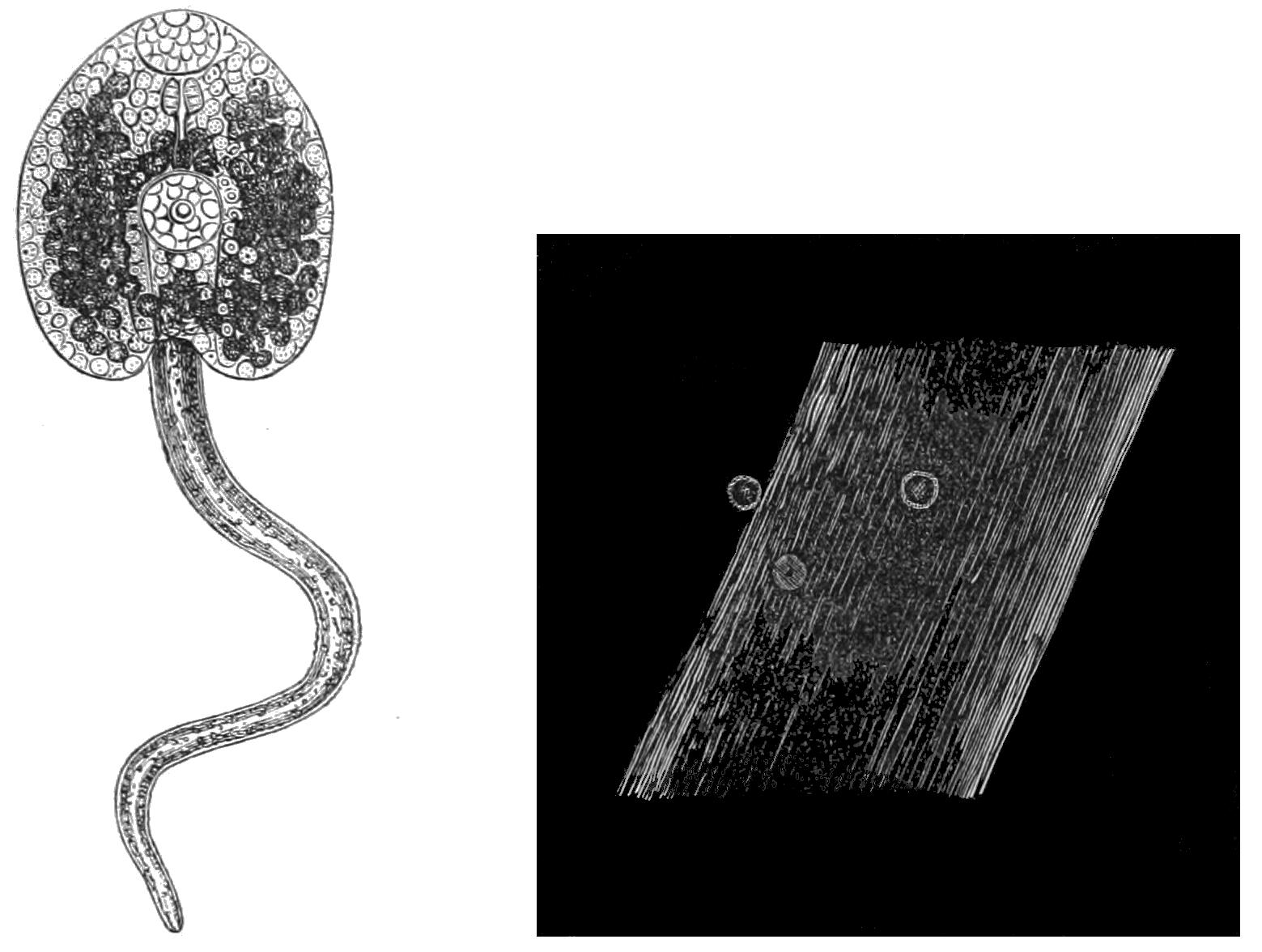
The left image shows the free-swimming cercariae, the swimming "tail" is clearly visible. The right side of the diagram shows the cysts attached to grass.

F. hepatica has a tegument that protects it from the enzymes of the host's digestive system, whilst still allowing water to pass through. Free-swimming larvae have cilia and the cercariae have a muscular tail to help them swim through the aquatic environment and also allow them to reach the plants on which they form a cyst. To attach within the host, F. hepatica has oral suckers and body spines. Their pharynges also help them to suck onto the tissues within the body, particularly within the bile ducts. The adult fluke's respiration is anaerobic; this is ideal, as no oxygen is available in the liver. F. hepatica is adapted to produce a large number of eggs, which increases its chances of survival, as many eggs are destroyed on release into the environment. Also, F. hepatica is hermaphrodite, thus all flukes can produce eggs, increasing the number of offspring produced by the population.

The genome for F. hepatica was published in 2015. At 1.3 Gb, its genome is one of the largest known pathogen genomes. The genome contains many polymorphisms, and this represents the potential for the fluke to evolve and rapidly adapt to changes in the environment, such as host availability and drug or vaccine interventions.

== Epidemiology ==
Infection begins when cyst-covered aquatic vegetation is eaten or when water containing metacercariae is drunk. In the United Kingdom, F. hepatica frequently causes disease in ruminants, most commonly between March and December.

Humans become infected by eating watercress or by drinking emoliente, a Peruvian drink that uses drops of watercress juice. Cattle and sheep are infected when they consume the infectious stage of the parasite from low-lying, marshy pasture.

Human infections have been reported from more than 75 countries around the world. In Asia and Africa, people are infected both by F. hepatica and F. gigantica whereas human fasciolosis is caused only by F. hepatica in South and Central America and Europe.

The presence of F. hepatica can interfere with the detection of bovine tuberculosis in cattle. Cattle co-infected with F. hepatica, compared to those infected with M. bovis alone, react weakly to the single intradermal comparative cervical tuberculin (SICCT) test. Therefore, an infection from F. hepatica can make it difficult to detect bovine tuberculosis; this is, of course, a major problem in the farming industry.

== Fasciolosis ==
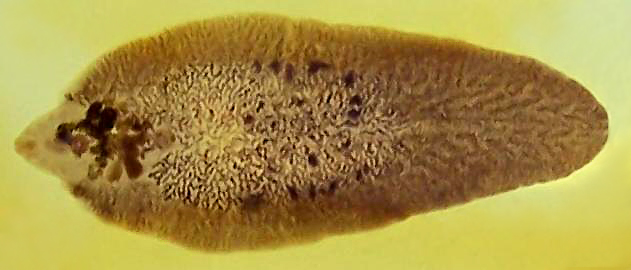
Slide showing the internal organs of Fasciola hepatica

Both F. hepatica and F. gigantica can cause fasciolosis. Human symptoms vary depending on whether the disease is chronic or acute. During the acute phase, the immature worms begin penetrating the gut, causing symptoms of fever, nausea, swollen liver (caused by Fh8), skin rashes, and extreme abdominal pain. The chronic phase occurs when the worms mature in the bile duct, and can cause symptoms of intermittent pain, jaundice, and anemia. In cattle and sheep, classic signs of fasciolosis include persistent diarrhea, chronic weight loss, anemia, and reduced milk production. Some remain asymptomatic. F. hepatica can cause sudden death in both sheep and cattle, due to internal hemorrhaging and liver damage.

Fasciolosis is an important cause of both production and economic losses in the dairy and meat industries. Over the years, the prevalence has increased and it is likely to continue increasing in the future. Livestock are often treated with flukicides, chemicals toxic to flukes, including bromofenofos, triclabendazole, and bithionol. Ivermectin, which is widely used for many helminthic parasites, has low effectivity against F. hepatica, as does praziquantel. For humans, the type of control depends on the setting. One important method is through the strict control over the growth and sales of edible water plants such as watercress. This is particularly important in highly endemic areas. Some farms are irrigated with polluted water, hence, vegetables farmed from such land should be thoroughly washed and cooked before being eaten.

The best way to prevent fasciolosis is by reducing the lymnaeid snail population or separating livestock from areas with these snails. These two methods are not always the most practical, so control by treating the herd before they are potentially infected is commonly practiced.

== Diagnosis ==
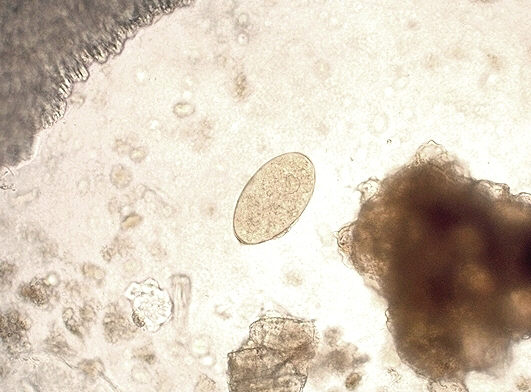
F. hepatica egg in stool sample

A diagnosis may be made by finding yellow-brown eggs in the stool. They are indistinguishable from the eggs of Fascioloides magna, although the eggs of F. magna are very rarely passed in sheep, goats, or cattle. If a patient has eaten infected liver, and the eggs pass through the body and out via the faeces, a false positive result to the test can occur. Daily examination during a liver-free diet will unmask this false diagnosis.

An enzyme-linked immunosorbent assay (ELISA) test is the diagnostic test of choice. ELISA is available commercially and can detect antihepatica antibodies in serum and milk; new tests intended for use on faecal samples are being developed. Using ELISA is more specific than using a Western blot or Arc2 immunodiffusion. Proteases secreted by F. hepatica have been used experimentally in immunizing antigens.

== See also ==
- List of parasites (human)
- Veterinary parasitology
- Trematoda
