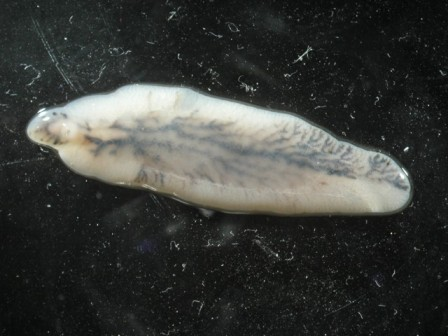
- Fasciola hepatica - adult worm

Scientific classification
- Kingdom: Animalia
- Phylum: Platyhelminthes
- Class: Trematoda
- Order: Plagiorchiida
- Suborder: Echinostomata
- Superfamily: Echinostomatoidea
- Family: Fasciolidae; Railliet, 1895

= Fasciolidae =

Family of flukes

Fasciolidae is a family of trematodes and includes several parasites involved in the veterinary and medical sciences, which cause the disease Fasciolosis. Fasciolidae is divided into five genera by Olson et al. 2003. The family's various species are localised in liver, gall bladder, and intestine. Their life-cycle includes an intermediate host, freshwater snails from the family Lymnaeidae.

== Morphology ==
Adult trematodes of Fasciolidae range in length from 2 cm, for species of Parafasciolopsis, and 10 cm, for species such as Fasciola gigantica. The oral and ventral suckers are usually located. the cercariae are of a gymnocephalic shape.

== Systematics within family ==
According to Olson et al. 2003 the family has five genera:

- Fasciola
  - Fasciola hepatica – Common liver fluke
  - Fasciola gigantica
  - Fasciola spp. – Japanese strain
- Fascioloides
  - Fascioloides magna
  - Fascioloides jacksoni
- Fasciolopsis
  - Fasciolopsis buski
- Parafasciolopsis
  - Parafasciolopsis fasciolaemorpha
- Protofasciola
  - Protofasciola robusta
