= Emoliente =

Traditional drink from Peru

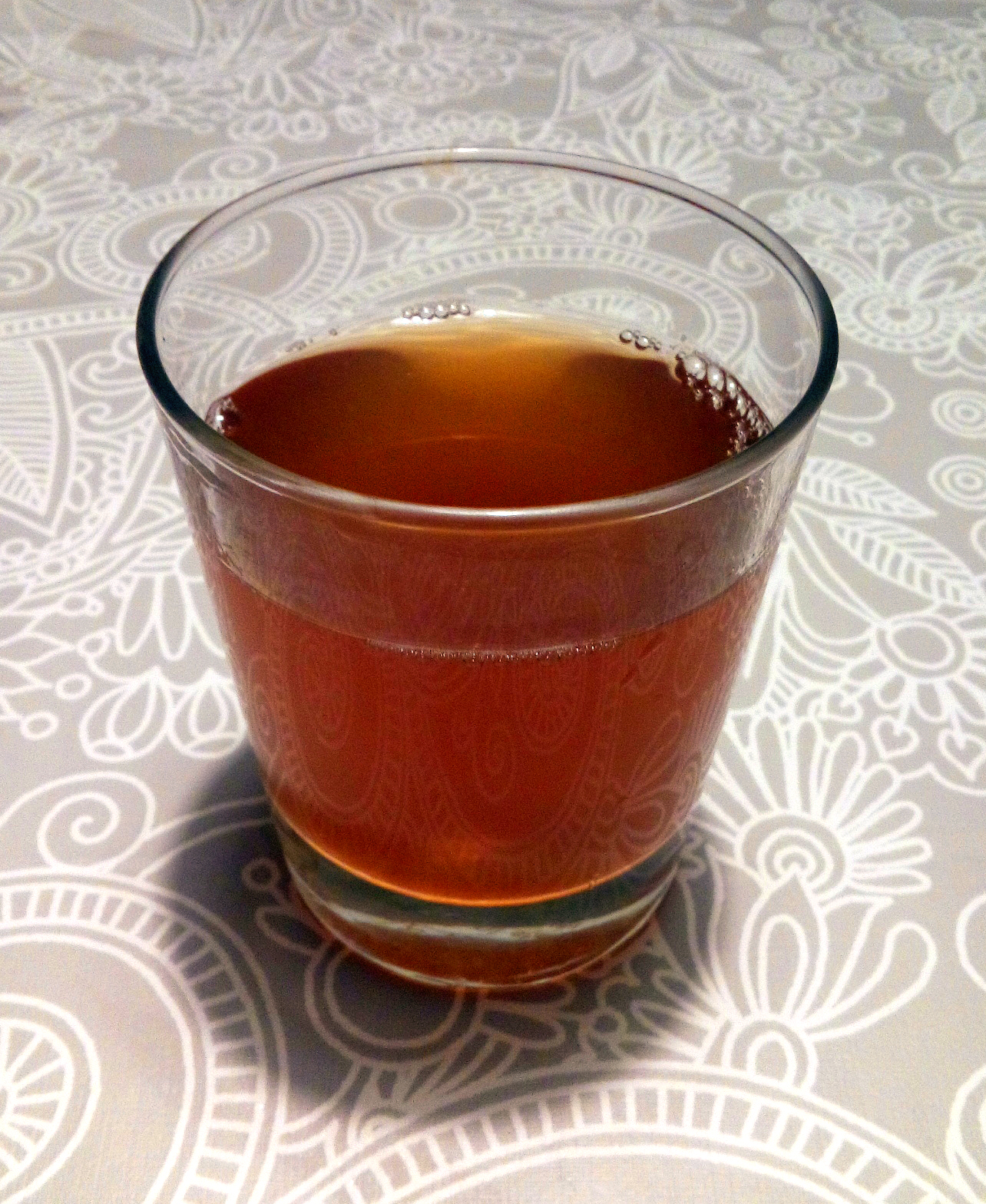
- Type: Tisane
- Origin: Viceroyalty of Peru, Peru
- Ingredients: Barley, Andean horsetail, flaxseed, alfalfa, ribwort plantain, boldo, sugar and lemon juice

An emoliente (Spanish pronunciation: [emolˈjente]) is a traditional drink consumed principally in Peru. It is customary to drink it in the morning or evening. Various medicinal properties are attributed to emolientes and they are used to treat digestive, reproductive, respiratory and circulatory problems.

Emolientes were introduced to Peru during the colonial era as a medicinal drink or tisane. In Lima they became popular to the point that there was an emolientero (emoliente seller) on practically every street corner.

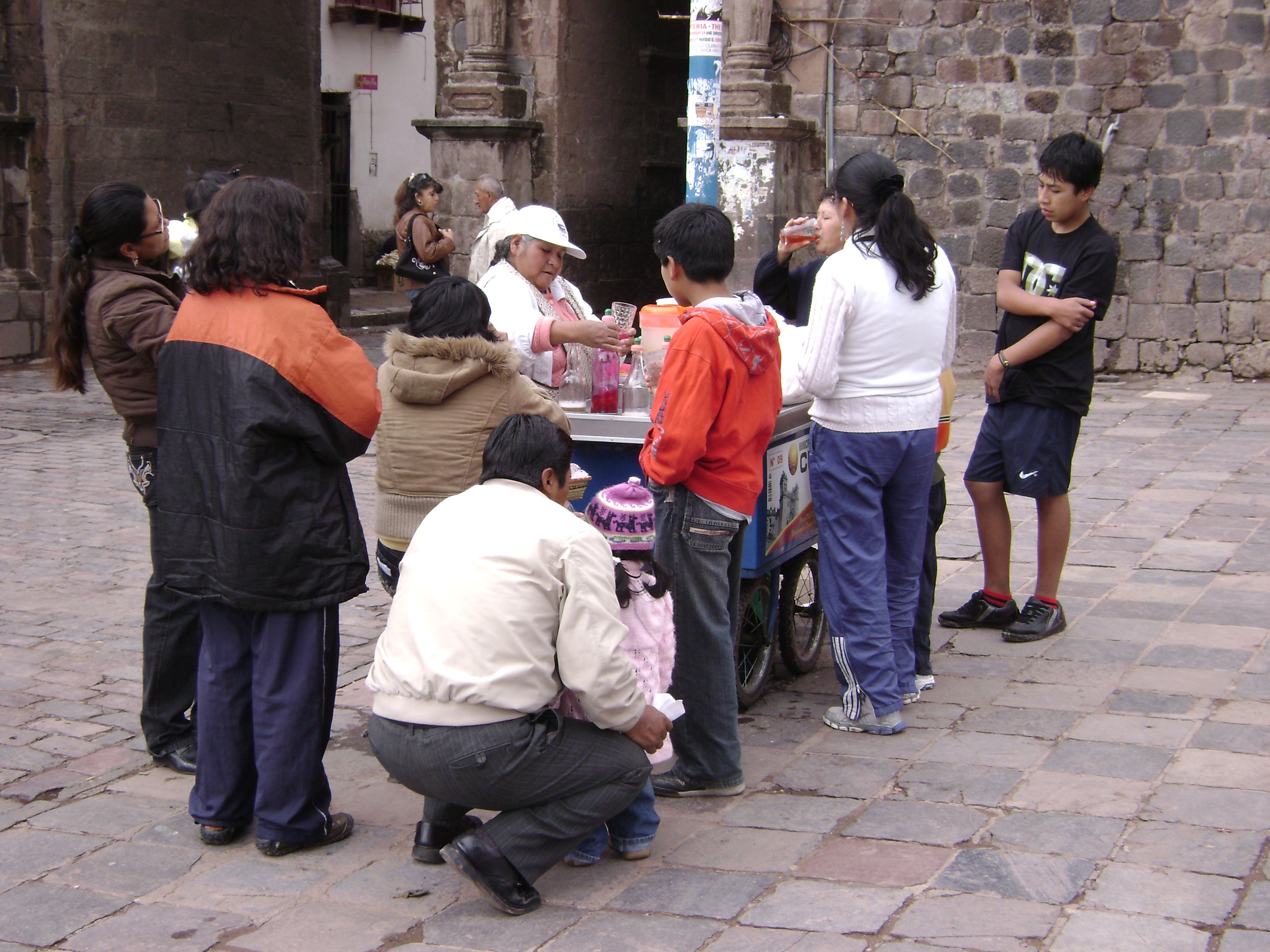
An emoliente seller in Cusco, Peru.

== Characteristics ==
An emoliente is a drink based on roasted grains of barley, medicinal herbal extracts, sugar and lemon juice. Amongst the most commonly used herbs are Andean horsetail, linseeds, alfalfa, ribwort plantain and boldo.

In recent years, emolliente sellers, especially those with mobile street carts, have been incorporating a range of medicinal plants into their drinks, some of which have been chosen due to their diuretic properties. These include cat's claw, maca, gale of the wind, sangre de grado, muña and Aloe. Other so-called "special" emolientes may include pollen, honey, algarrobina, corn silk, spices (such as cinnamon) or infusions made from fruit (quince or pineapple) or potato skins.
