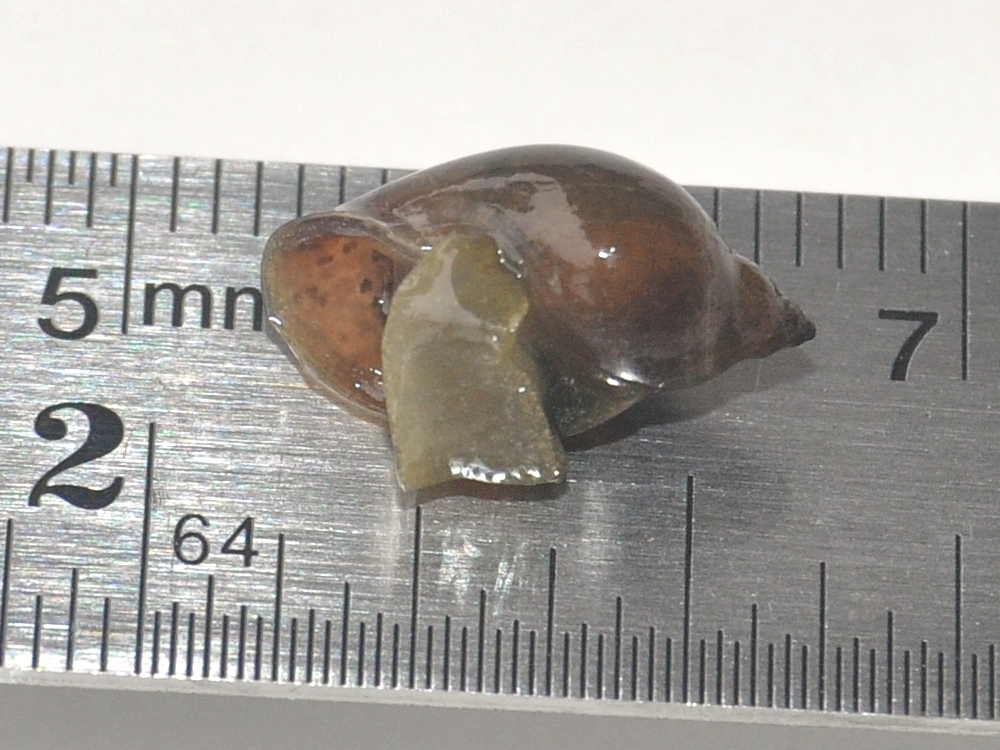

Scientific classification
- Kingdom: Animalia
- Phylum: Mollusca
- Class: Gastropoda
- Superorder: Hygrophila
- Family: Lymnaeidae
- Genus: Radix
- Species: R. rubiginosa

Binomial name
- Radix rubiginosa (Michelin, 1831)

Synonyms
- Lymnaea rubiginosa Michelin, 1831; Lymnaea auricularia rubiginosa; Radix auricularia rubiginosa

= Radix rubiginosa =

Species of gastropod

Radix rubiginosa is a species of air-breathing freshwater snail, an aquatic pulmonate gastropod in the family Lymnaeidae, the pond snails.

This species is sometimes treated as a subspecies of Radix auricularia.

== Distribution ==
This species occurs in its native range in:

- Indo-China
- Indonesia
- Vietnam - it was firstly identified in Vietnam in 2013 in southern Vietnam.

It occurs as an introduced "hothouse alien" in:

- Great Britain
- Ireland

== Description ==
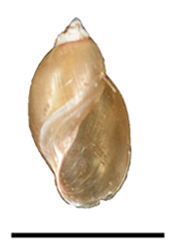
Apertural view of a shell of Radix rubiginosa.

The shape of the shell is elongated and cylindrical. The shell has 5 whorls.

The aperture is moderately expanded. The width of the aperture is 4–5 mm. The height of the aperture is 7–11 mm.

The width of the shell is 5–8 mm. The height of the shell is 11–20 mm.

== Habitat ==
This species inhabits small canals.

== Parasites ==
Parasites of Radix rubiginosa include:

- Radix rubiginosa is the first intermediate host for Hypoderaeum conoideum
- Fasciola gigantica
- Echninoparyphium dunni and Echinostoma audyi
- Pleurolophocercous cercariae (Heterophyidae) were recorded from Radix rubiginosa in China.

== Human use ==
This species is sold in the ornamental pet trade as an item for freshwater aquaria.
