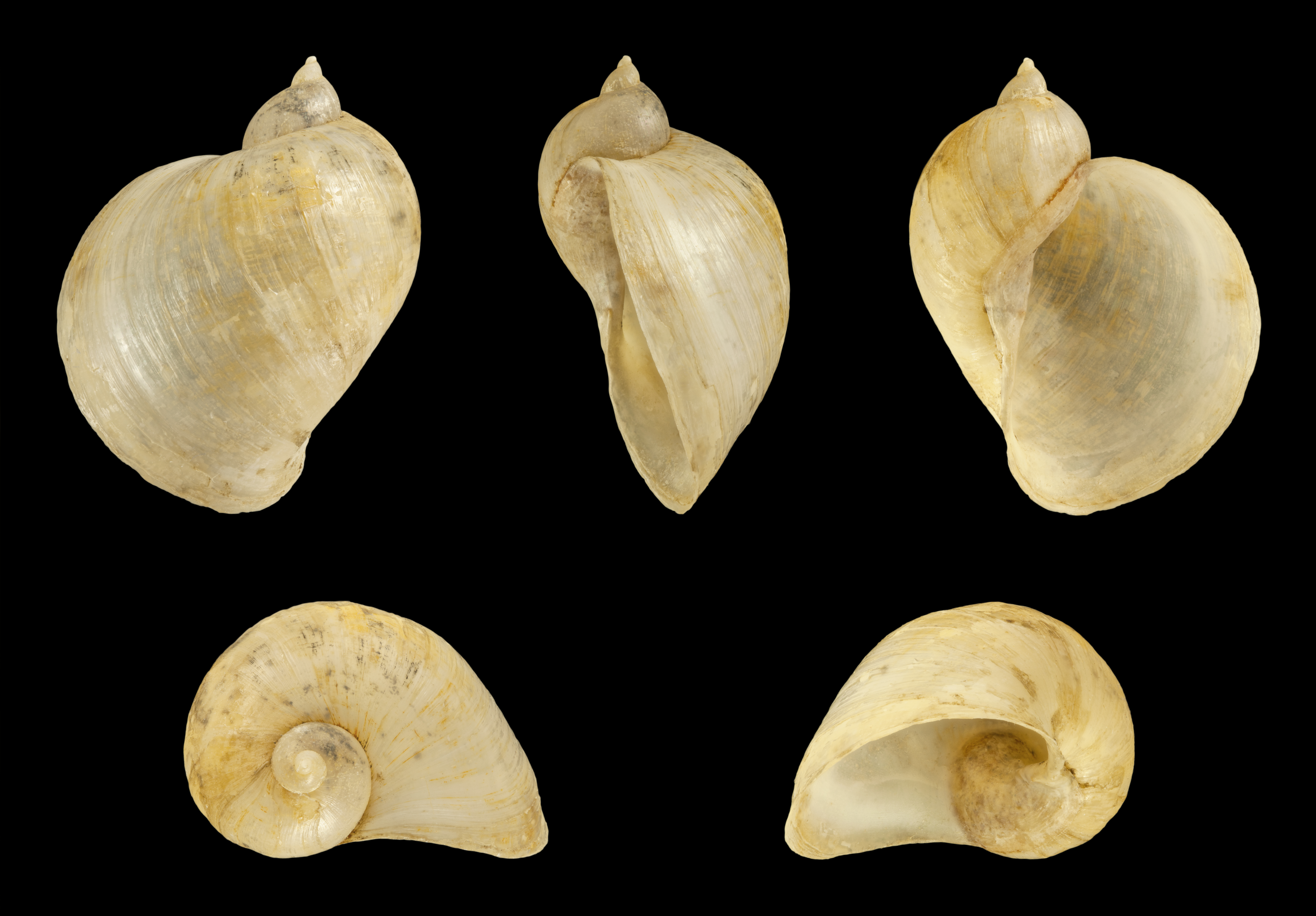
- A shell of Radix auricularia

Conservation status
- Least Concern (IUCN 3.1)

- Secure (NatureServe)

Scientific classification
- Kingdom: Animalia
- Phylum: Mollusca
- Class: Gastropoda
- Superorder: Hygrophila
- Family: Lymnaeidae
- Genus: Radix
- Species: R. auricularia

Binomial name
- Radix auricularia (Linnaeus, 1758)

Synonyms
- Helix auricularia Linnaeus, 1758; Limnaea auricularia; Lymnaea auricularia (Linnaeus, 1758); Radix (Radix) auricularia (Linnaeus, 1758); † Radix (Radix) auricularia auricularia (Linnaeus, 1758) (subspecies rank sensu Wenz not accepted); Radix auriculatus Montfort, 1810 (unnecessary substitute name for Helix auricularia)

= Radix auricularia =

Radix auricularia Temporal range: Pleistocene–Recent

Species of gastropod

Radix auricularia, the big-ear radix, is a species of medium-sized freshwater snail, an aquatic pulmonate gastropod mollusk in the family Lymnaeidae.

Radix auricularia is the type species of the genus Radix.

== Forms ==
Forms of Radix auricularia include:

- Radix auricularia f. tumida (Held, 1836)
- Radix auricularia f. subampla (Ehrmann, 1933)

== Shell description ==
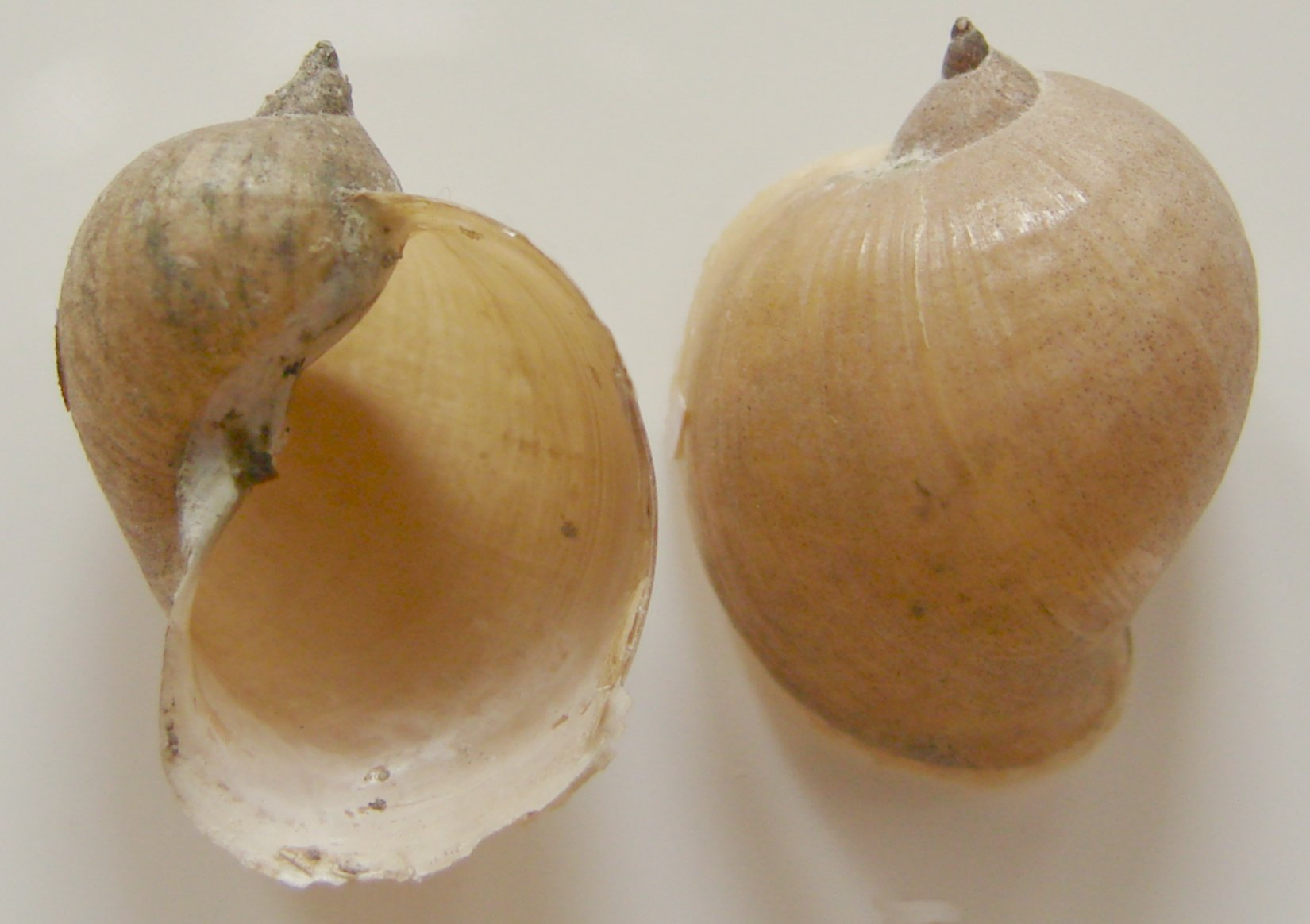
Two shells of Radix auricularia

The shell is thin, roundly ovate and very inflated, such that the last whorl comprises 90% of its volume.

The shell has a rounded and broad spire that pinches in steeply at the apex. The spire is short and conic, and is very small compared with the body whorl.

There are 4–5 whorls with deep sutures between them. The whorls are convex, inflated, smooth and rapidly increasing. The body whorl is large and spreading. The surface is shining, lines of growth are fine, wavy, crowded, with occasionally a heavy ridge representing a rest period. Sutures are deeply impressed, channeled in some specimens.

The color of the shell is yellow, beige or tan.

The ear-shaped aperture, which contains no operculum, is around 5 times higher than the spire. The aperture is very large, ovate, occupying four-fifths of the length of the entire shell. It is rounded above and flaring in old specimens below. The peristome is thin and sharp. The columella is sigmoid with a plait across the middle, which is reflected over the umbilicus.

The umbilicus is either wide or covered. Usually the umbilicus is narrow, deep, nearly closed. The epidermis is sometimes marked by light and dark lines of color, alternating.

The shell of the species can grow to ~30 mm in height and 25 mm in width as a full grown adult. However, most individuals in a population only grow to approximately half the maximum size. The width of the shell is from 12 to 18 mm, and the height of the shell is 14–24 mm. The shell of Radix auricularia has a width to length ratio greater than 0.75.

== Anatomy ==
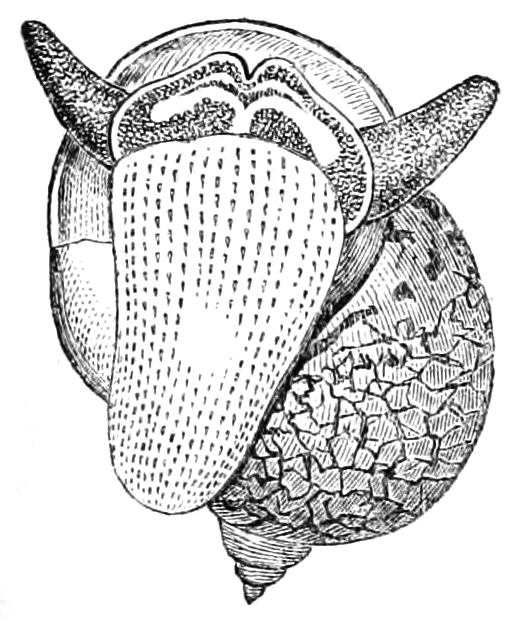
Drawing of a live Radix auricularia

The body is flecked with small white spots on the back of the head and tentacles, but not on the foot. The mantle is pigmented with a line of dark spots along its edge, irregular spots which show through the shell. The foot is roundly elongated, 18 × 11 mm.

The head is broad, auriculated. This species also has tentacles that are large, flat, lobate, triangular, fan-shaped and wider than they are high.

The blood contains blue hemocyanin. The heart pulsations are slow and regular: thirty-four per minute. The animal is slow and deliberate in its movements.

== Distribution ==
=== Indigenous distribution ===
Radix auricularia is native to Europe and most of the Palearctic including Oman, Tibet and Vietnam.

In Europe it occurs in:

- Croatia
- Finland
- Germany
- Sweden
- British Isles: Great Britain and Ireland
- Netherlands
- Poland
- Czech Republic
- Slovakia
- and others

In Asia it occurs across the East Palearctic and in

- Oman
- Vietnam – in northern Vietnam
- and others

=== Nonindigenous distribution ===
Radix auricularia is an introduced species in the United States and New Zealand.

In the Mid-Atlantic Region it is found in the Charles River in Massachusetts, Cayuga Lake and the Hudson River in New York State, in various ponds in New Jersey, New York, and Pennsylvania, and in Lake Champlain in Vermont.

In the Great Lakes Region: The first record of Radix auricularia in North America is from the Hudson River (which is connected through the New York Canal System to Lakes Erie and Ontario) near Troy, New York, before 1869. The next record is from Lincoln Park, Chicago, beside Lake Michigan in 1901. Subsequently, it was found in Lake Erie and a tributary stream in 1911 and in 1948, and in Lake Ontario in 1930. It is also reported from Lake Huron.

In 2019, Radix auricularia was recorded in Botswana and South Africa.

This species has shown a potential to adapt to new environments within large lakes, as indicated by its recent history in Lake Baikal, Russia, where this introduced species was previously restricted to shallow bays and floodplain areas, but has recently been able to colonize the rocky drop-off in the lake. The shells of those snails in the new habitat have a more inflated aperture and are more compact than those in the shallow zones, indicating that wave action may have selected for snails with a stronger suctioning foot in the newly colonized habitat.

== Ecology ==
=== Habitat ===
This species is found in freshwater lakes, ponds, and slow-moving rivers with mud bottoms. Radix auricularia can live on boulders or vegetation in low or high-flow environments, and is capable of tolerating anoxic conditions, but it tends to prefer very lentic waters in lakes, bogs or slow rivers where there is a silt substrate.

It has been found in environments with a pH from 6.0 to 7.1. Its average thermal preference is ~19 °C, but there is great fluctuation around this mean, depending on the photoperiod for the time of year. In Great Britain, the species is restricted to hard water. It can tolerate polysaprobic waters, or areas of major pollution and anoxia with high concentrations of organic matter, sulfides and bacteria.

=== Feeding habits ===
Radix auricularia is in the family Lymnaeidae, which consists of scrapers and collector-gatherers. This species feeds on such items as detritus, Cladophora spp. (algae), and sand grains.

=== Life cycle ===
Like almost all pulmonate snails, it is a hermaphrodite. It undergoes oogenesis in spring as the daylight hours increase, and spermatogenesis in late summer and early fall as the daylight hours decrease. It is iteroparous, breeding biennially. It lays its eggs in clumps of 50 to 150 eggs. Eggs develop faster as temperature increases from 10 °C upward, but the eggs fail to survive and develop when the water temperature reaches 36 °C.

=== Parasites ===
Various lymnaeid snails, including Radix auricularia, are vectors for a diverse range of parasites, particularly trematodes. About 80% specimens of Radix auricularia from population near Wielkopolska National Park were found to contain trematodes.

Radix auricularia serves as a host to numerous parasites including:

- As first and as second intermediate host for:
  - Echinostoma revolutum
  - Echinoparyphium recurvatum
  - Hypoderaeum conoideum
- As first intermediate host for:
  - Clinostomum complanatum
- As a second intermediate host for:
  - Apatemon gracilis
- As an intermediate host for:
  - Radix auricularia is the most important intermediate host for Fasciola gigantica.
  - as an intermediate host for Fasciola hepatica in Oman.
  - Notocotylus attenuatus
- As a paratenic host for:
  - Hymenolepis lanceolata

As a host for:

- Trichobilharzia franki
- Trichobilharzia ocellata
- Trichobilharzia szidati
- Mantoscyphidia radixi
- Orientobilharzia turkestanica
- Diplostomum spathaceum
- Paryphostomum radiatum
- Opisthioglyphe ranae
- Plagiorchis elegans
- Australapatemon burti
- Hypoderaeum conoideum
- Isthmiophora melis
- Notocotylus attenuatus
- Tylodelphis clavata

Some of these parasites may infect humans.

One study found that average shell height and infection severity with Trichobilharzia spp. are positively related.

In its native habitat, this species preys on eggs of the parasite Ascaris suum, which survive and develop after passage through the gut, and are dispersed widely, due to the activity of the snail.
