= Ampullaceana balthica =

Scientific classification
- Kingdom: Animalia
- Phylum: Mollusca
- Class: Gastropoda
- Superorder: Hygrophila
- Family: Lymnaeidae
- Genus: Ampullaceana
- Species: A. balthica

Binomial name
- Ampullaceana balthica (Linnaeus, 1758)

Synonyms
- Lymnaea ovata Draparnaud, 1805

Species of gastropod

Ampullaceana balthica is a species of gastropods belonging to the family Lymnaeidae.

The species is found in Eurasia.
