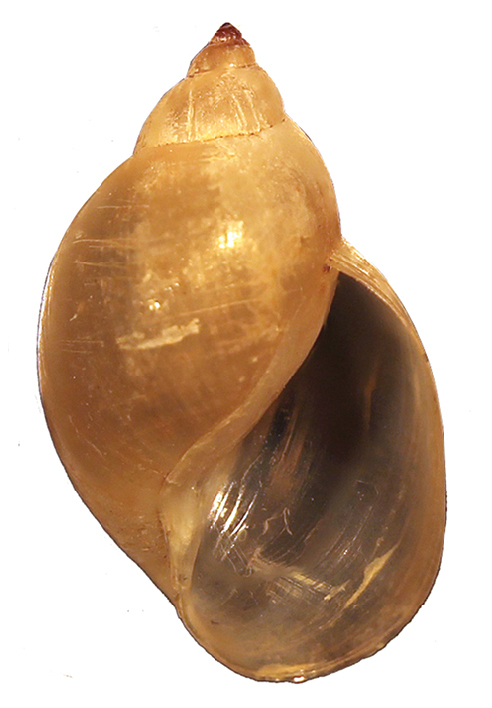
- Shell of Racesina luteola

Conservation status
- Least Concern (IUCN 3.1)

Scientific classification
- Kingdom: Animalia
- Phylum: Mollusca
- Class: Gastropoda
- Superorder: Hygrophila
- Family: Lymnaeidae
- Genus: Racesina
- Species: R. luteola

Binomial name
- Racesina luteola (Lamarck, 1822)

Synonyms
- Lymnaea luteola Lamarck, 1822; "Cerasina luteola" Lamarck, 1822; "Radix luteola" Lamarck, 1822

= Racesina luteola =

Species of snail

Racesina luteola is a species of freshwater snail of the family Lymnaeidae.

== Taxonomic history ==
The species was first described as Lymnaea luteola by French naturalist Jean-Baptiste Lamarck in 1822. While a later phylogenetic study moved it to the genus Radix in 2010, R. luteola was reassigned eight years later as the type species to the newly described genus Racesina. This taxonomy is currently accepted by MolluscaBase, the mollusk-oriented branch of WoRMS.

== Distribution and habitat ==
R. luteola is a widespread species in south Asia and southeast Asia.
