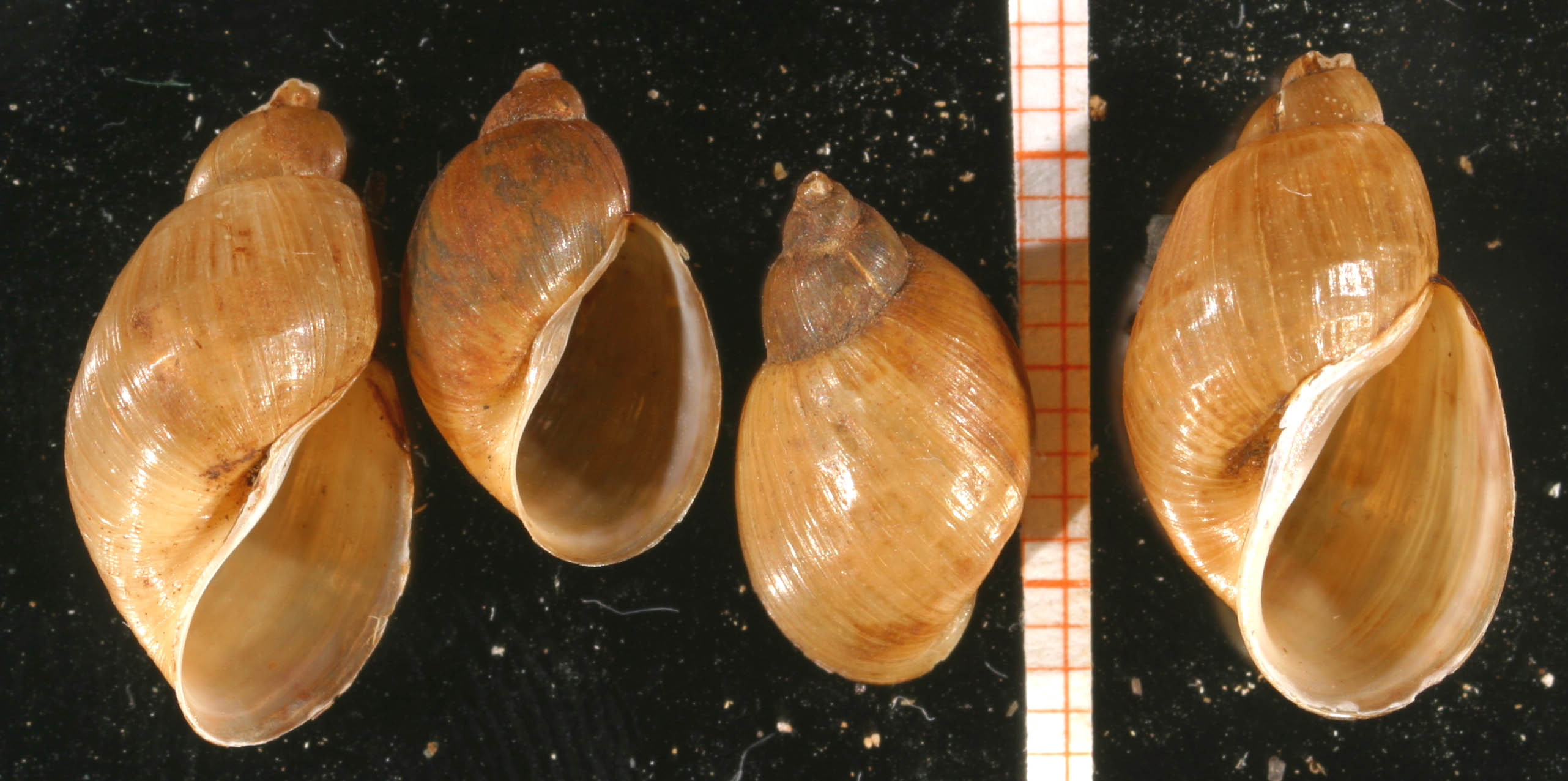
- Four shells with scale bar showing cm and mm

Scientific classification
- Kingdom: Animalia
- Phylum: Mollusca
- Class: Gastropoda
- Superorder: Hygrophila
- Family: Lymnaeidae
- Genus: Peregriana
- Species: P. peregra

Binomial name
- Peregriana peregra (O. F. Müller, 1774)

Synonyms
- Radix labiata (Rossmässler, 1835); Lymnaea peregra; Lymnaea pereger; Radix peregra (O. F. Müller, 1774)

= Peregriana peregra =

Species of gastropod

Peregriana peregra is a species of air-breathing freshwater snail, an aquatic pulmonate gastropod in the family Lymnaeidae, the pond snails.

== Distribution and habitat ==
This small pond snail is found in Europe, Newfoundland and northern Asia. This species is common in slow-moving or still water.

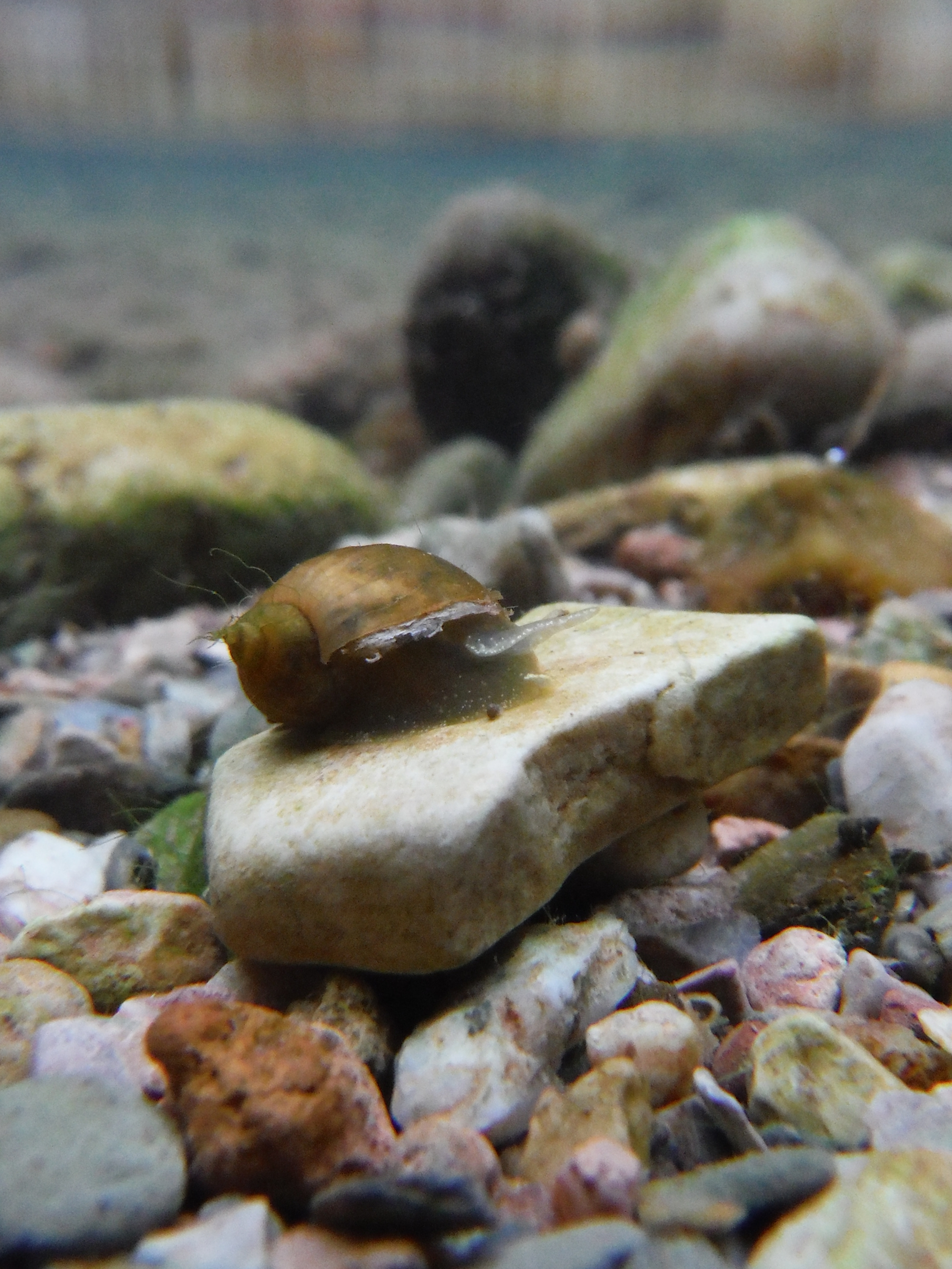
