= Echinostoma hortense =

Scientific classification
- Kingdom: Animalia
- Phylum: Platyhelminthes
- Class: Trematoda
- Order: Plagiorchiida
- Family: Echinostomatidae
- Genus: Echinostoma
- Species: E. hortense

Binomial name
- Echinostoma hortense (Asada, 1926)

Species of fluke

Echinostoma hortense is an intestinal fluke of the class Trematoda, which has been found to infect humans in East Asian countries such as Korea, China, and Japan. This parasite resides in the intestines of birds, rats and other mammals such as humans. While human infections are very rare in other regions of the world, East Asian countries have reported human infections up to about 24% of the population in some endemic sub-regions. E. hortense infections are zoonotic infections, which occurs from eating raw or undercooked freshwater fish. The primary disease associated with an E. hortense infection is called echinostomiasis, which is a general name given to diseases caused by Trematodes of the genus Echinostoma.

== Life cycle ==
The eggs of E. hortense are passed in the feces of the definitive host. Eggs that have reached water will mature within 6~15 days. Once hatched, the short-lived miracidia seek out and infect freshwater snails such as Lynnaea pervia and Radix auricularia coreana. Inside the snail, mother sporocysts develop from the germinal cells of the miracidia and usually migrate to a site such as the heart. The mother sporocysts reproduce asexually to generate many mother rediae. The mother rediae migrates to the digestive glands of the snail where it produces many daughter rediae. For the duration of the snail's life the daughter rediae generate cercariae after feeding on the snail's gonads. In the water, the cercariae seek out and penetrate the body surface or orifice of a second intermediate host, which is usually a fish, leech, tadpole, or another snail. Once inside the second intermediate host, the cercariae encyst into metacercariae and remain dormant for many months until the second intermediate host is eaten by a definitive host. Inside the definitive host, the metacercariae attach to the walls of the small intestine and mature into adults.

== Morphology ==
Echinostoma hortense are slender (7.92 × 1.33 mm), and has a characteristic head crown equipped with 27 collar spines around the subterminal oral sucker. The ventral sucker (0.68 × 0.77 mm) is positioned at the anterior third of the body and is much larger than the oral sucker (0.25 × 0.26 mm). The uterus is distended and contains thin-shelled elliptical eggs. A spontaneously discharged egg (124.3 × 68.6 μm) has an operculum at the narrower end and a well-defined germ ball. Two testes are distinct, slightly lobulated, and located in tandem at the equatorial portion.

== Symptoms ==
The major symptoms of echinostome infections are thought to be abdominal pain, diarrhea, and easy fatigability. Infections involving E. hortense, however, are considered to be more severe than those seen in heterophyid infections. This is evidenced by the lab results that have shown severer mucosal damage and even ulcerations of the mucosa in rats infected with E. hortense. Furthermore, case studies in humans have shown that manifestations of severe ulcerative lesions in the duodenum, urinary incontinence, and hematemesis are also possible.

== Diagnosis ==
Human echinostomiasis can be diagnosed through the recovery of eggs through a fecal examination. In known endemic areas, careful microscopic examinations followed by measurement of the eggs should suffice. Patients who prefer a more definite diagnosis should consent to a gastroduodenoscopy, primarily in the upper small intestine, to confirm the presence of the adult fluke.

== Treatment ==
Echinostome infections can be successfully eradicated through the use of praziquantel (PZQ). It is recommended that patients take ten to twenty milligrams of PZQ for each kilogram of body weight. Albendazole may also be an effective drug for treatment, but literature backing its efficacy is lacking.
