= Echinostoma cinetorchis =

Scientific classification
- Kingdom: Animalia
- Phylum: Platyhelminthes
- Class: Trematoda
- Order: Plagiorchiida
- Family: Echinostomatidae
- Genus: Echinostoma
- Species: E. cinetorchis

Binomial name
- Echinostoma cinetorchis Ando & Ozaki, 1923

Species of fluke

Echinostoma cinetorchis is a species of human intestinal fluke, a trematode in the family Echinostomatidae.

== Distribution ==
This species occurs in Korea.

== Hosts ==
Hosts of Echinostoma cinetorchis include:

- Cipangopaludina chinensis (Gray, 1834) – Chinese mystery snail, an intermediate host
- Austropeplea ollula – as a first and main intermediate host
- Note on Hippeutis (Helicorbis) cantori – this species had previously been reported as first and second intermediate host, but in a subsequent study in a laboratory setting, the species was not able to be infected at all.
- Segmentina hemispaerula as a first and second intermediate host in Korea, based on laboratory work.
- Gyraulus convexiusculus as a potential first and second intermediate host in Korea, based on laboratory work.

Experimentally induced infection of host species that occur in Korea in a laboratory setting include:

From miracidia to cercaria, i.e. as a primary intermediate host:

- Hippeutis sp. – experimentally induced infection

From cercaria to metacercaria, i.e. as a second intermediate host:

  - Hippeutis sp. – experimentally induced infection
  - Radix auricularia subspecies corecna – experimentally induced infection
  - Physella acuta, listed as Physa acuta – experimentally induced infection

and to a very small extent, due to the mostly lethal effect of the infection,

  - Cipangopaludina sp. – experimentally induced infection
