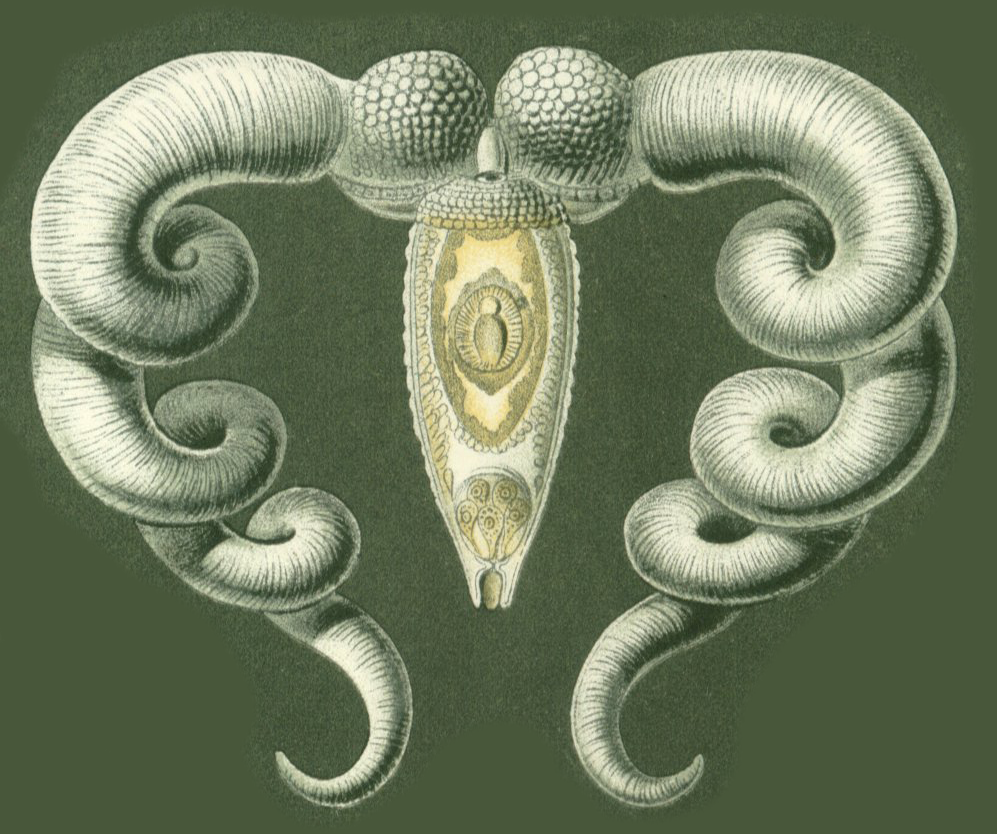
- Bucephalus polymorphus larva

Scientific classification
- Domain: Eukaryota
- Kingdom: Animalia
- Phylum: Platyhelminthes
- Class: Trematoda
- Order: Plagiorchiida
- Suborder: Bucephalata; La Rue, 1926
- Superfamily: Bucephaloidea; Poche, 1907

= Bucephaloidea =

Superfamily of flukes

The Bucephaloidea are a superfamily of trematode flatworms, belonging to the large group Digenea. Many species are endoparasites of mollusks and fish. The name Bucephalus meaning "ox head" was originally applied to the genus Bucephalus because of the horn-like appearance of the forked tail (furcae) of its cercaria larva. By what Manter calls a "curious circumstance", horns are also suggested by the long tentacles of adult worms.

Most trematodes have several distinct developmental stages. The motile cercaria larva is released by the first intermediate host, typically a snail, and parasitizes a second intermediate host, where it encysts into a metacercaria. Finally, the adult flatworm typically inhabits the alimentary system or other body cavity of a fish.

The families of Bucephaloidea are Bucephalidae and Nuitrematidae.

== Family Bucephalidae ==
Bucephalids are trematode parasites of fish. The intermediate hosts include mollusks and at least one amphibian. One characteristic feature is an anterior rhyncus or holdfast that is separate from the digestive system. They also differ from other digeneans in the configuration of the digestive systems and genitalia.

== Family Nuitrematidae ==
This family was described in 1975 by Kurochkin. It has many features similar to the bucephalids, but the body is sharply subdivided in two parts. The family is monotypic; it contains only one genus, Nuitrema.
