= Echinostoma caproni =

Scientific classification
- Kingdom: Animalia
- Phylum: Platyhelminthes
- Class: Trematoda
- Order: Plagiorchiida
- Family: Echinostomatidae
- Genus: Echinostoma
- Species: E. caproni

Binomial name
- Echinostoma caproni Richard, 1964

Synonyms
- Echinostoma liei Jeyarasasingam et al., 1972; Echinostoma togoensis Jourdan & Kulo, 1981; Echinostoma paraensei Lie & Basch, 1967

Species of fluke

Echinostoma caproni is a species of 37-spined Egyptian echinostome. It is naturally found in Cameroon, Congo, Egypt, Madagascar, and Togo.

Echinostoma caproni uses a wide range of snails species as first and second intermediate hosts, such as Biomphalaria species and Pseudosuccinea columella. It can use different rodents, such as mice, rats and the African giant shrew, as definitive hosts. However, the suitability of these definitive hosts varies markedly.

In the definitive host the metacercariae excyst in the duodenum. The juvenile worms then move down to the ileum. About ten days after infection, E. caproni eggs appear in the host faeces. The eggs then take another ten days to develop, before miracidia appear from them. These miracidia remain infective to snail first intermediate hosts for up to 8 hours after hatching. After infection of the snail, miracidia develop into sporocysts, which, in turn, produce cercariae. These cercariae will try to find a second intermedia host, where they encyst. To aid the searching process they use gravity and light cues.

In mice, a single oral doses of praziquantel, artesunate, or artemether can fully clear the animal of adult E. caproni infections. If other trematode parasites also infect the snail, E. caproni competes with them for resources.
