= Echinostoma bolschewense =

Scientific classification
- Kingdom: Animalia
- Phylum: Platyhelminthes
- Class: Trematoda
- Order: Plagiorchiida
- Family: Echinostomatidae
- Genus: Echinostoma
- Species: E. bolschewense

Binomial name
- Echinostoma bolschewense (Kotova, 1939) Nasincova, 1991

Synonyms
- Cercaria bolschewensis Kotova (1939)

Species of fluke

Echinostoma bolschewense is a species of echinostome from the Czech Republic, Russia, and the Slovak Republic.

Echinostoma bolschewense has a typical trematode life-cycle; In nature the redia occur in Viviparus contectus and V. acerosus that serve as the first intermediate hosts. These produce cercariae that carry the 37 collar spines (10–13 μm) as is usual in the Echinostoma. The metacercariae can encyst on a wide range of host snails. In nature they have been found on Viviparus contectus, Lymnaea stagnalis, Planorbarius corneus, Physa fontinalis, and Radix auricularia. Mammals serve as the definitive host where the adults can grow up to 12.5 mm. and in which eggs (138–162 μm) are produced.
