= Echinostoma miyagawai =

Scientific classification
- Kingdom: Animalia
- Phylum: Platyhelminthes
- Class: Trematoda
- Order: Plagiorchiida
- Family: Echinostomatidae
- Genus: Echinostoma
- Species: E. miyagawai

Binomial name
- Echinostoma miyagawai Ishii, 1932

Synonyms
- Echinostoma friedi Toledo, Muñoz-Antolı́ & Esteban, 2000

Species of fluke

Echinostoma miyagawai is a species of echinostome parasite that is found in Europe, Southeast Asia and Japan.

It can use multiple aquatic snail species as first intermediate host, such as Planorbis planorbis, Anisus vortex, and Radix peregra. The definitive host species include the wild duck, the tufted duck, the domestic chicken, and the brown rat. In the definitive host it resides in the small intestine, cecum, and rectum. In Thailand and Laos E. miyagawai, is more common parasite of free-living ducks than E. revolutum.

== Taxonomy ==
Genetic analysis has shown that the species can be subdivided into two different lineages; a Eurasian lineage and an Australian lineage. The latter includes individuals from Australia and the Americas. Genetic exchange within these lineages over such long distances is possible through distribution by birds. However, it has also been suggested that the Eurasian lineage might actually present a distinct species.

Furthermore, Echinostoma miyagawai is a cryptic species and there is still debate about whether E. miyagawai and E. robustum should be considered as one species, or two separate species. The TkD1Int5 sequence implies two individual species, but the results from the mitochondrial genes cytochrome c oxidase, and NADH dehydrogenase are less clear. This debate is further complicated by the notion that hybridisation between the two species might occur.

== Hosts ==
According to the World Register of Marine Species, Echinostoma miyagawai has been seen in the following hosts:

=== Intermediate hosts ===
- Gyraulus centrifugops
- Anisus vortex
- Stagnicola corvus
- Gyraulus chinensis
- Ampullaceana balthica
- Stagnicola palustris
- Peregriana peregra
- Great pond snail
- Great ramshorn
- Planorbis planorbis
- Dybowski's frog
- Common frog

=== Definitive hosts ===
- Falcated duck
- Mallard
- Tufted duck
- Ferruginous duck
- Rock dove
- Red junglefowl
- Pallas's gull
- Black-headed gull
- Golden hamster
- Brown rat
- Spotted dove
- Northern lapwing
