= Orientogalba ollula =

Scientific classification
- Kingdom: Animalia
- Phylum: Mollusca
- Class: Gastropoda
- Superorder: Hygrophila
- Family: Lymnaeidae
- Genus: Orientogalba
- Species: O. ollula

Binomial name
- Orientogalba ollula (Gould, 1859)

Synonyms
- Galba laticallosiformis Yen, 1937 (a junior synonym); Galba pervia (E. von Martens, 1867) junior subjective synonym; Limnaea goodwinii E. A. Smith, 1876 (a junior synonym); Limnaea laticallosa Annandale & H. S. Rao, 1925 (a junior synonym); Limnaea ollula A. A. Gould, 1859 (superseded combination); Limnaea pervia E. von Martens, 1867 (unaccepted combination); Limnaeus goodwini E. A. Smith, 1876 superseded combination; Limnaeus pervius E. von Martens, 1867 (junior synonym); Limnea (Gulnaria) shantungensis K. H. Jones & Preston, 1904 junior subjective synonym; Limnea davidii Deshayes, 1870 ·

Species of gastropod

Orientogalba ollula is a species of air-breathing freshwater snail, an aquatic pulmonate gastropod mollusk in the family Lymnaeidae, the pond snails.

== Description ==
The length of the shell attains 8 mm.

(Original description in Latin) The shell is small, thin, and oval in shape, with a greenish horn-like color and a somewhat unpolished surface. It has about four and a half whorls, the last of which is swollen or rounded. The aperture is roundly oval, and the columella is simple, being covered posteriorly with a broad callus.

== Distribution ==
This species occurs in:

- China
- Hong Kong
- Taiwan
- Korea
- Japan
- Philippines

== Parasites ==
In Korea, Orientogalba ollula serves as a first and main intermediate host for the trematode species Echinostoma cinetorchis from the family Echinostomatidae.

Orientogalba ollula also serves as first intermediate host for the fluke Neodiplostomum seoulense in Korea.
