= Bucephalus mytili =

Scientific classification
- Kingdom: Animalia
- Phylum: Platyhelminthes
- Class: Trematoda
- Order: Plagiorchiida
- Family: Bucephalidae
- Genus: Bucephalus
- Species: B. mytili

Binomial name
- Bucephalus mytili Cole 1935

Species of fluke

Bucephalus mytili is a parasitic flatworm of the class Trematoda. It is a parasite of fish and a parasitic castrator of the mussel Mytilus edulis, where it destroys the mussel's gonads and causes the mussel to grow much larger than normal.

The cercaria of B. mytili were described in 1935 occurring in Mytilus edulis in Wales. They are the sporocysts, which are long and tangled within the mollusk host's digestive gland, and cause parasitic castration of the host.
