= Bucephalus elegans =

Scientific classification
- Domain: Eukaryota
- Kingdom: Animalia
- Phylum: Platyhelminthes
- Class: Trematoda
- Order: Plagiorchiida
- Family: Bucephalidae
- Genus: Bucephalus
- Species: B. elegans

Binomial name
- Bucephalus elegans Woodhead, 1930

Species of fluke

Bucephalus elegans is a species of Trematoda. It is parasitic in the clam species Eurynia iris, which is found in the Huron River, near Ann Arbor, Michigan.
