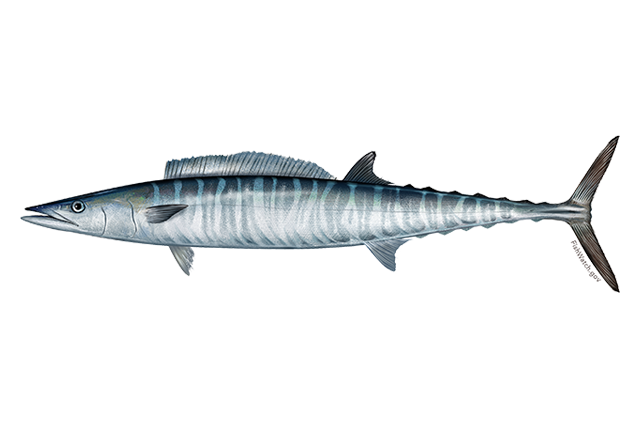

Conservation status
- Least Concern (IUCN 3.1)

Scientific classification
- Kingdom: Animalia
- Phylum: Chordata
- Class: Actinopterygii
- Division: Teleostei
- Order: Scombriformes
- Family: Scombridae
- Subfamily: Scombrinae
- Tribe: Scomberomorini
- Genus: Acanthocybium; Gill, 1862
- Species: A. solandri

Binomial name
- Acanthocybium solandri (Cuvier, 1832)

Synonyms
- List: Cybium solandri Cuvier, 1832; Jordanidia solandri (Cuvier, 1832); Cybium sara Lay & Bennett, 1839; Acanthocybium sara (Lay & Bennett, 1839); Cybium petus Poey, 1860; Acanthocybium petus (Poey, 1860); Cybium verany Döderlein, 1872; Acanthocybium forbesi Seale, 1912; Scomber amarui Curtiss, 1938

= Wahoo =

Species of fish

The wahoo (Acanthocybium solandri) is a scombrid fish found worldwide in tropical and subtropical seas. In Hawaii, the wahoo is known as ono. The species is sometimes called hoo in the United States. It is best known to sports fishermen, as its speed and high quality makes it a prized and valued game fish.

== Distribution ==
Wahoo have a circumtropical distribution and are found in Atlantic, Pacific, and Indian Oceans. Population genomic research using RAD sequencing indicates that two weakly differentiated fish stocks are in the Atlantic and Indo-Pacific Oceans, likely with a considerable degree of migration and gene flow between these populations.

== Description ==
At Christmas Island

Its body is elongated and the back is an iridescent blue, while the sides are silvery with a pattern of irregular vertical blue bars. These colors fade rapidly at death. The mouth is large, and the teeth of the wahoo are razor sharp. Both the upper and lower jaws have a somewhat sharper appearance than those of king or Spanish mackerel. Specimens have been recorded at up to 2.77 metres (9 ft 1 in) in length, and weighing up to 83 kilograms (183 lb). The growth of the fish can be quite quick.

== Biology ==
Head closeup

Their diet is made up of other fish and squid. From a study surrounding the Western and Central Pacific Ocean (WCPO), an analysis of the stomach contents of wahoo indicated that their diet consists of 84.64% native fish, 14.26% cephalopods (e.g. cuttlefish), and 1.1% crustaceans. The gender ratio of wahoo favors females over males with ratios ranging from 1:0.9 (Puerto Rico) to 3.5:1 (North Carolina), which is common for most pelagic marine species.

Most wahoo taken from waters have a trematode parasite, the giant stomach worm (Hirudinella ventricosa), living in their stomachs, but it does not appear to harm the fish.

=== Life cycle ===
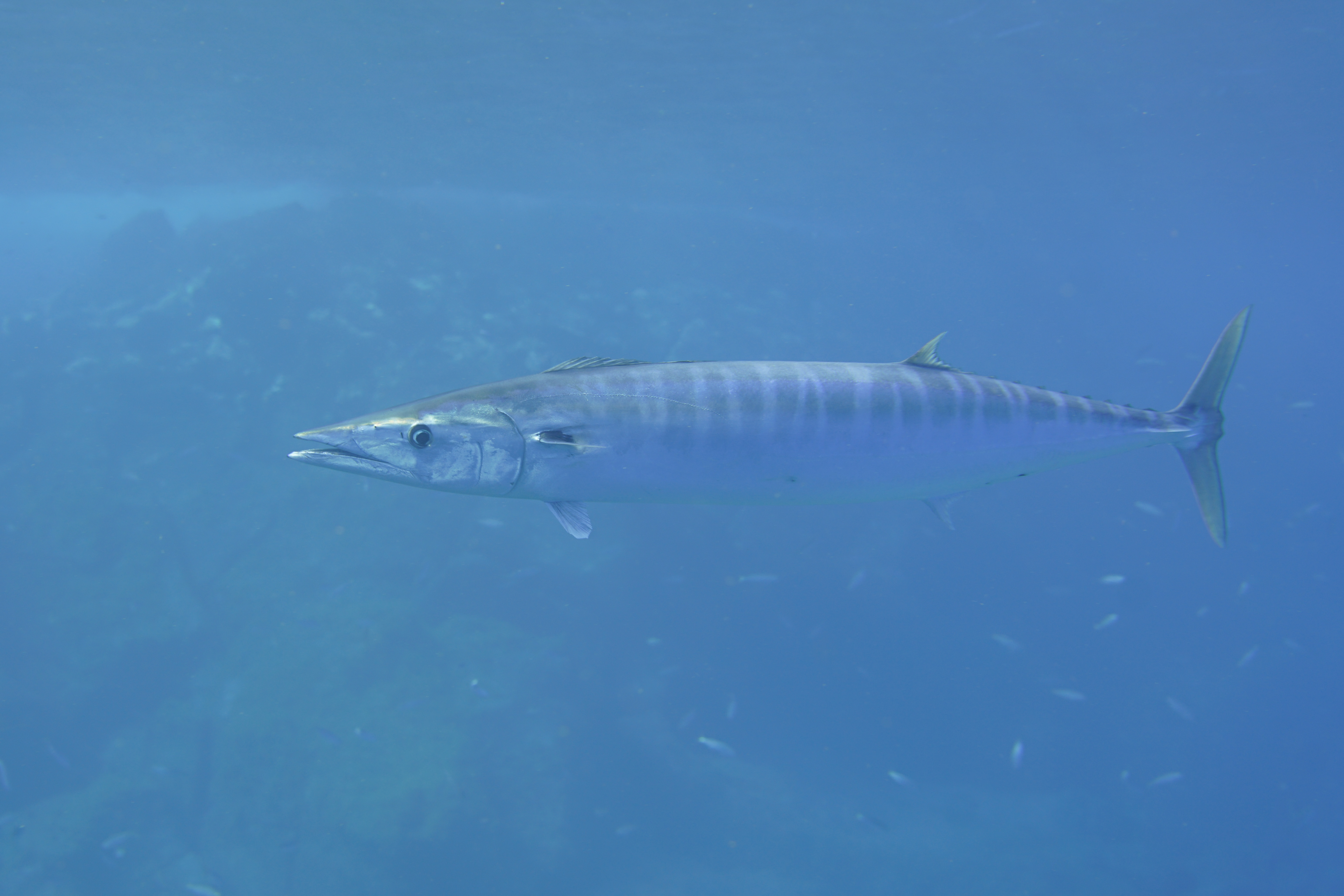
At Tenerife, Canary Islands

The eggs of the species are buoyant and the larvae are pelagic. Wahoo tend to be solitary or occur in loose-knit groups of two or three fish. Where conditions are suitable, they can be found in schools around 100 or more.

== Fisheries ==
The flesh of the wahoo is white and/or grey, delicate to dense, and highly regarded by many cuisines. The taste has been said to be similar to mackerel. This has created some demand for the wahoo as a premium-priced commercial food fish. In many areas of its range, such as Hawaii, Bermuda, and many parts of the Caribbean, local demand for the wahoo is met by artisanal commercial fishermen who take them primarily by trolling.

=== Commercial ===
Although local wahoo populations can be affected by heavy commercial and sport-fishing pressure, wahoo as a species is less susceptible to industrial commercial fishing than more tightly schooling and abundant species such as tuna. Wahoo are regularly taken as a bycatch in various commercial fisheries, including longline fisheries for tuna, billfish, and dolphinfish (mahi-mahi or dorado). It is also taken in tuna purse seine fisheries, especially in sets made around floating objects, which act as a focal point for a great deal of other marine life besides tuna. In 2003, the South Atlantic Fishery Management Council issued a Dolphin Wahoo Fishery Management Plan for the Atlantic. The species as a whole, though, is not considered overfished.

=== Recreational ===
In sport-fishing, the wahoo is considered an extremely valuable catch.

Wahoo are most successfully fished with live bait around deep-water oil and gas platforms in the Gulf of Mexico during the winter.
