= Echinoparyphium elegans =

Scientific classification
- Kingdom: Animalia
- Phylum: Platyhelminthes
- Class: Trematoda
- Order: Plagiorchiida
- Family: Echinostomatidae
- Genus: Echinoparyphium
- Species: E. elegans

Binomial name
- Echinoparyphium elegans Looss, 1899

Species of fluke

Echinoparyphium elegans is a species of trematode. Intermediate hosts include snails, bivalves, and fish. Definitive hosts are mainly birds and mammals.

== Hosts ==
According to the World Register of Marine Species, Echinoparyphium elegans has been found in the following definitive hosts:

- Mallard
- American black duck
- American flamingo
- Barn owl
