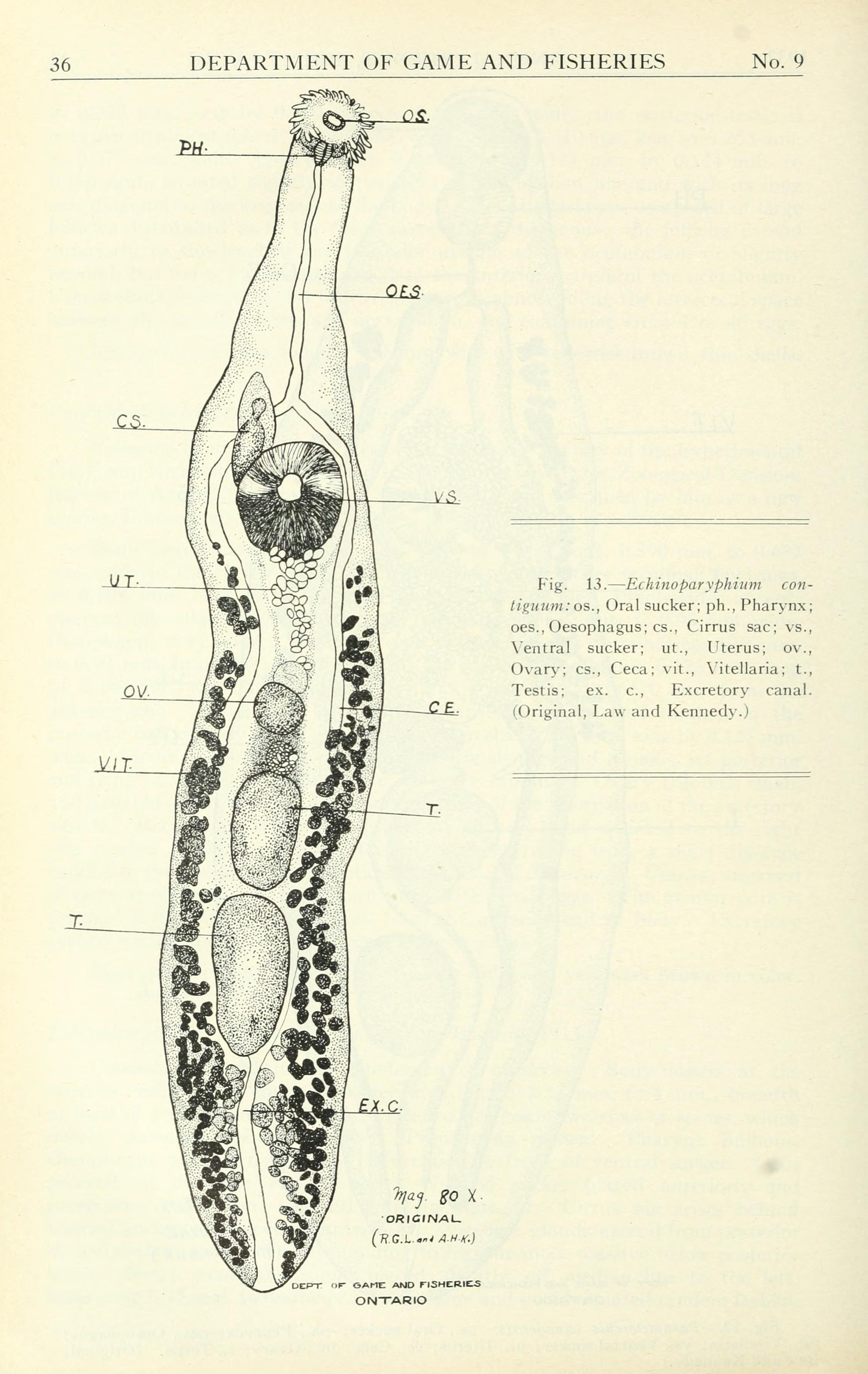
- Echinoparyphium contiguum

Scientific classification
- Kingdom: Animalia
- Phylum: Platyhelminthes
- Class: Trematoda
- Order: Plagiorchiida
- Family: Echinostomatidae
- Subfamily: Echinostomatinae
- Genus: Echinoparyphium; Dietz, 1909

Species
- Echinoparyphium aconiatum; Echinoparyphium contiguum; Echinoparyphium elegans; Echinoparyphium flexum; Echinoparyphium recurvatum

= Echinoparyphium =

Genus of flukes

Echinoparyphium is a genus of trematodes. Intermediate hosts include snails, bivalves and fish. Definitive hosts are mainly birds and mammals.

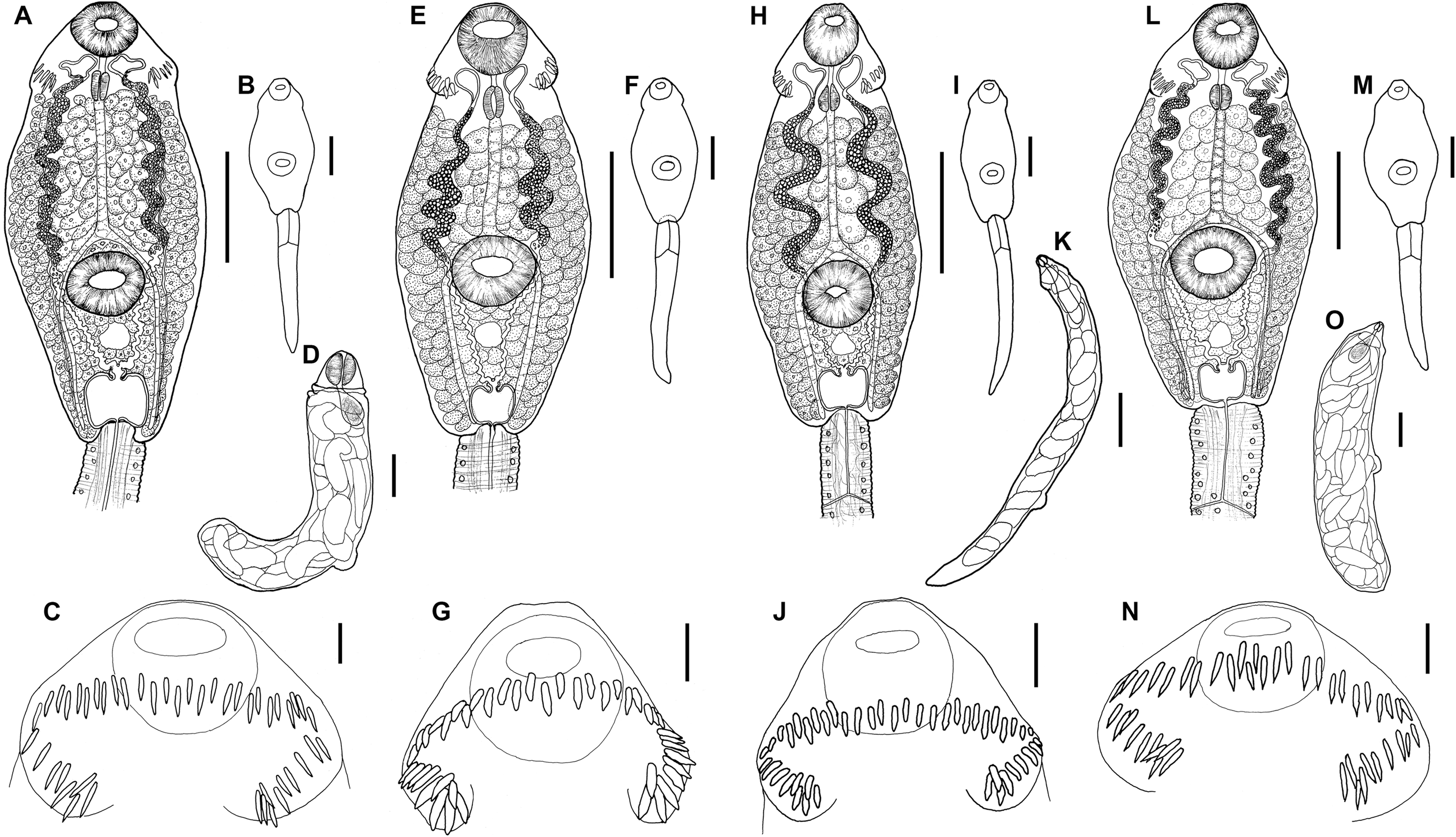
Cercariae of several Echinoparyphium species
