= Hypoderaeum =

Scientific classification
- Kingdom: Animalia
- Phylum: Platyhelminthes
- Class: Trematoda
- Order: Plagiorchiida
- Family: Echinostomatidae
- Subfamily: Echinostomatinae
- Genus: Hypoderaeum; Dietz, 1909

Genus of flatworms

Hypoderaeum is a genus of flatworms belonging to the family Echinostomatidae.

The species of this genus are found in Europe and Northern America.

Species:

- Hypoderaeum charadrii
- Hypoderaeum conoideum (Bloch, 1782)
- Hypoderaeum cubanicum (Artyukh, 1958)
- Hypoderaeum essexense (Khan, 1960)
- Hypoderaeum gnedini Baschkirova, 1941
- Hypoderaeum skrjabini Oshmarin, 1946
- Hypoderaeum vigi Baschkirova, 1941
