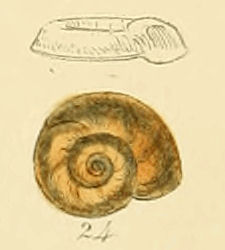

Conservation status
- Least Concern (IUCN 3.1)

Scientific classification
- Kingdom: Animalia
- Phylum: Mollusca
- Class: Gastropoda
- Superorder: Hygrophila
- Family: Planorbidae
- Genus: Hippeutis
- Species: H. complanatus

Binomial name
- Hippeutis complanatus (Linnaeus, 1758)

Synonyms
- List: Helix complanata Linnaeus, 1758; Helix fontana [Lightfoot], 1786; Hippeutis (Hippeutis) fontanus ([Lightfoot], 1786); Planorbis (Hippeutis) colchicus Lindholm, 1913; Planorbis (Hippeutis) complanatus (Linnaeus, 1758); Planorbis complanatus (Linnaeus, 1758); Segmentina (Hippeutis) complanata (Linnaeus, 1758); Segmentina complanata (Linnaeus, 1758)

= Hippeutis complanatus =

Species of gastropod

Hippeutis complanatus, or the flat ram's-horn snail, is a species of small air-breathing freshwater snail, an aquatic pulmonate gastropod mollusk or micromollusk in the family Planorbidae, the ram's horn snails.

Hippeutis complanatus is the type species of the genus Hippeutis.

== Distribution ==
The species is found in the Palearctic zone, including Europe.

- Latvia
- Czech Republic - least concern (LC)
- Slovakia
- Poland
- Germany
- Austria
- Netherlands
- Sweden
- British Isles: Great Britain, Ireland

== Shell description ==
This minute shell is almost perfectly planispiral and shaped like a lens. The whorls overlap one another. The shell color varies from offwhite to a brownish yellow.

== Ecology ==
This snail lives in ponds and ditches, and prefers calcium-rich waters.
