= Nuitrematidae =

Scientific classification
- Kingdom: Animalia
- Phylum: Platyhelminthes
- Class: Trematoda
- Order: Plagiorchiida
- Superfamily: Bucephaloidea
- Family: Nuitrematidae; Kurochkin, 1975

Family of flukes

Nuitrematidae is a monotypic family of trematodes in the order Plagiorchiida. It consists of one genus, Nuitrema Kurochkin, 1975, which consists of one species, Nuitrema strigeiforme Kurochkin, 1975.
