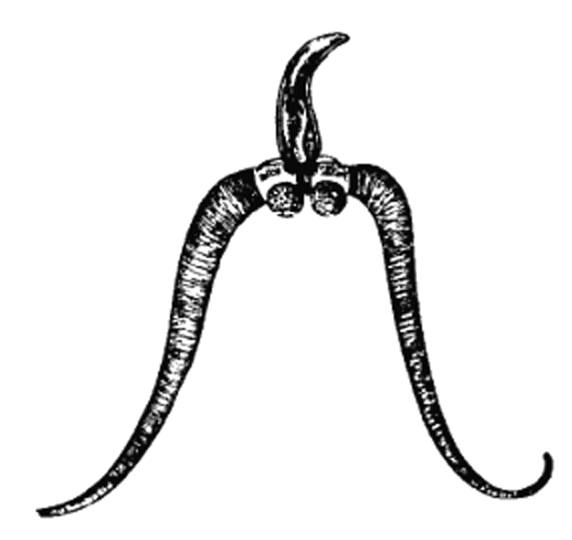
- Cercaria larva of B. polymorphus from Encyclopædia Britannica, Eleventh Edition

Scientific classification
- Kingdom: Animalia
- Phylum: Platyhelminthes
- Class: Trematoda
- Order: Plagiorchiida
- Family: Bucephalidae
- Genus: Bucephalus
- Species: B. polymorphus

Binomial name
- Bucephalus polymorphus Baer, 1827

= Bucephalus polymorphus =

Species of fluke

Bucephalus polymorphus is a type of flatworm. This species is within the Bucephalidae family of Digenea, which in turn is a subclass of Trematodes within the phylum Platyhelminthes (i.e. flatworm). It is characterized by having a mouth near the middle of its body, along with a sac-like gut. The mouth opening is located in the centre of the ventral surface. This is a specific body type of cecaria known as a gastrostome.

The adults occur in the gut of marine and fresh-water fish. The metacercariae encyst in smaller fish, sometimes in the nervous system. These parasitic flatworms are dorso-ventrally flattened animals characterized by a bilaterally symmetrical body enclosed within a syncytial tegument. They have a distal, anucleate later (distal cytoplasm). The distal cytoplasm contains vesicular inclusions that are Golgi derived. The adults of these acoelomate worms are common in the digestive tract, but are also found in other organs of vertebrates. The adult parasite attaches via a characteristic anterior adhesive organ with tentacles. This organ is recognized as a holdfast, which helps Bucephalus to stay attached to the host's organs. Bucephalus are native to North American fresh waters that parasitize freshwater bivalves.

== Taxonomy ==
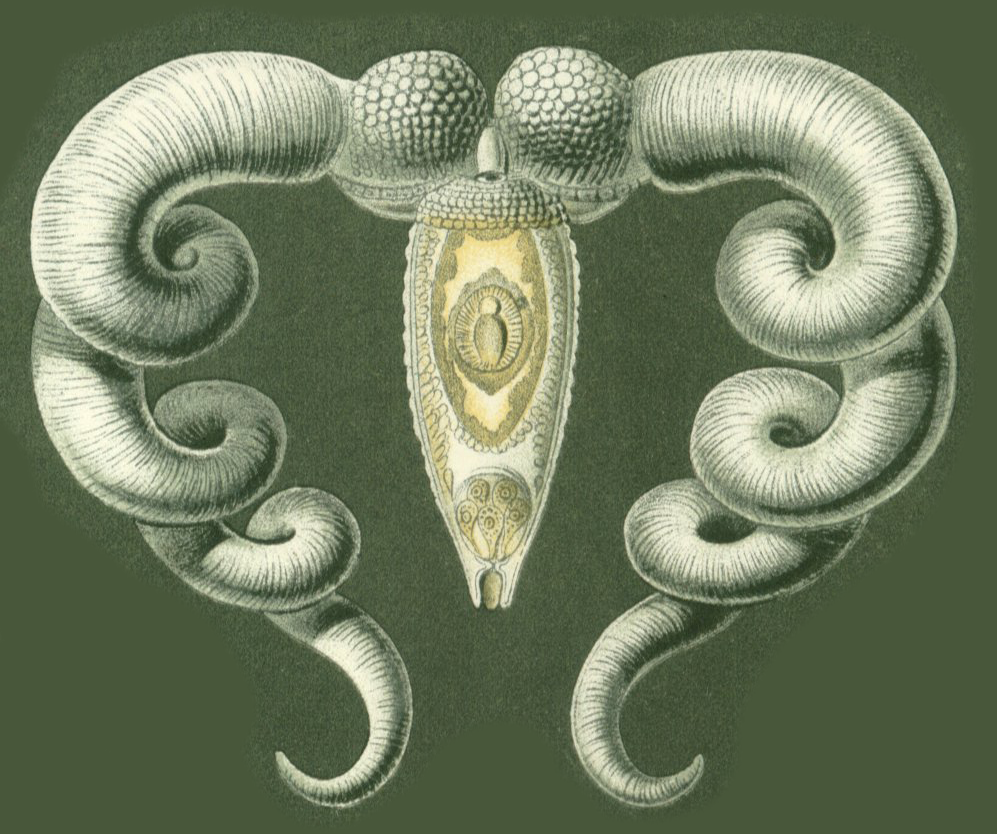
Bucephalid cercaria larva from Ernst Haeckel's Kunstformen der Natur (1904).

The genus Bucephalus was based on this species, which was the earliest known, initially described by Baer (1827) from its cercaria. Von Siebold (1848) believed that the adult bucephalid he named Gasterostomum fimbriatum represented an adult form of the same bucephalid, but this identity has never been proven.

== Life cycle ==
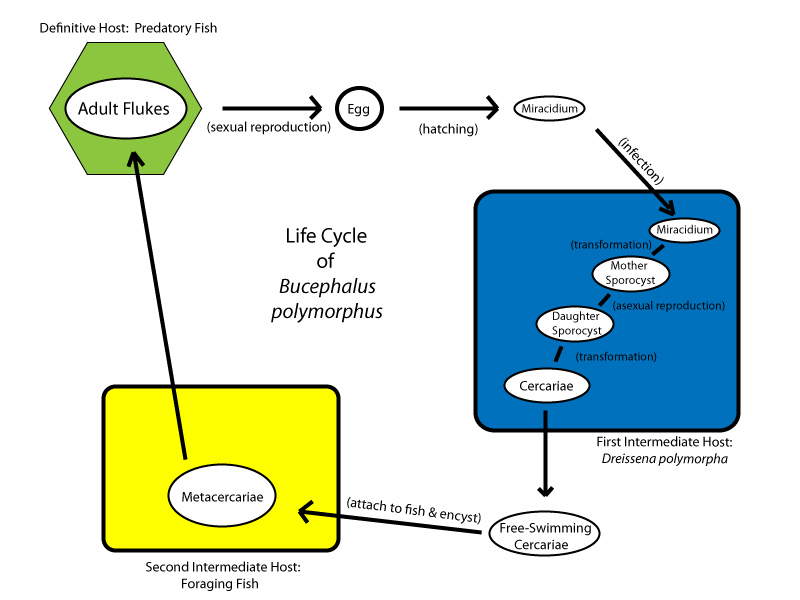
Dignetic flatworm species require more than one host to complete a full life cycle. Bucephalus polymorphus requires three hosts. Dreissena polymorpha, a small freshwater mussel, is the first intermediate host parasitized by the hatching miracidium. Within the visceral mass of Dreissena, the miracidium transforms into a mother (primary) sporocyst. Asexual reproduction produces many daughter (secondary) sporocysts which are called cecariacysts, that eventually release cercariae. Unlike most digenetic trematodes, Bucephalus Polymorphus lacks a redial stage and thus emerges as a cecaria directly from the sporocyst stage. Rapid proliferation of sporocysts results in a knotted white mass of tubules, which is found primarily in the gonads of the mussel. Released from the infected mussels, cercariae attach to fish (second intermediate host), encyst, and transforms into metacercariae. The third (definitive) hosts are predatory fish that consume the infected foraging fish. It has been shown experimentally that cercarial emergence exhibits a circadian rhythm of shedding with a peak in the dark period of a light:dark 12:12 h photoperiod.

== Influence on host ==
Bucephalus polymorphus is a parasite residing exclusively in host connective tissues. The gonads of its first intermediate host, Dreissena, are the primary target of infection and sporocyst proliferation. As infection intensifies, the sporocyst develops branches through connective tissue passages, emerges from the gonads, and can spread into other body regions. Such secondary sites of infection have been previously reported to occur in the digestive glands, the gills, the bundles of adductor muscle, and the mantle epithelium lining the interior of the shells. The study found that the digestive glands of infected bivalves appeared to be relatively normal when compared to full bodied, uninfected specimens. Within the sporocyst, the cercariae existed within a wide range of developmental stages, indicating that its development is asynchronous. It was also observed that heavy infection of the parasite led to host castration, which left the entire gonadal space often occupied by the sporocysts. By limiting the infection almost exclusively to the gonads, the parasites have developed an interesting strategy to only use the reproductive energy of their hosts, thereby minimizing the risk of host mortality. Extending the life of a bucephalus infected host is important because this allows the parasite to proliferate continuously from year to year, since infected gonads produce cercariae instead of gametes. The location of the sporocyst (primarily in gonads), its overall shape, irregular branches, and the morphology of its cercariae with a bifurcated tail, distinguish B. polymorphus from other trematode parasites of zebra mussels in histological sections.

== Prevalence ==
Infection of B. polymorphus is geographically widely distributed. However, prevalence of infection in zebra mussel population is not common. A study by Lajtner et al., which surveyed the zebra mussel population in the Drava River in Croatia, found a prevalence of 21.3%. In the most extensive study conducted to date, a prevalence of 73% was recorded in zebra mussel in South-Eastern France. Low rates of prevalence were also recorded: 1% (Kuperman et al. 1994), 1–4% (Baturo 1977), 2–5% (Smirnova and Ibrasheva 1967), 9% (Malloy et al. 1996), and 13–28% (de Kinkelin et al. 1968). Therefore, the prevalence of Bucephalus polymorphus can vary widely depending on the ecosystem.
