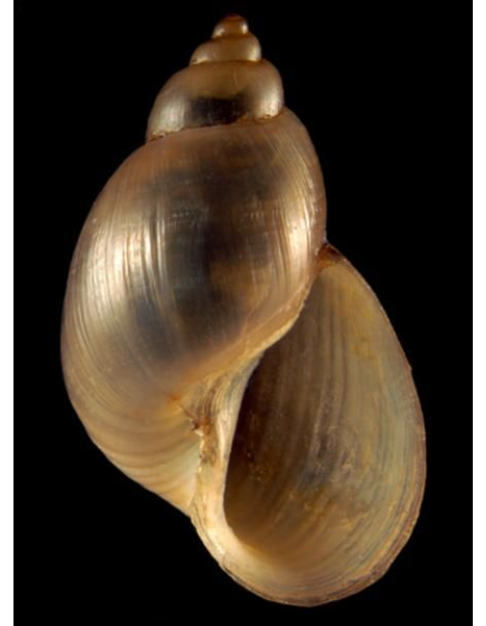
- Shell of Orientogalba viridis

Scientific classification
- Kingdom: Animalia
- Phylum: Mollusca
- Class: Gastropoda
- Superorder: Hygrophila
- Family: Lymnaeidae
- Genus: Orientogalba; Kruglov & Starobogatov, 1985

Type species
- Lymnaea heptapotamica Lazareva, 1967

Synonyms
- Lymnaea (Orientogalba) Kruglov & Starobogatov, 1985 superseded rank; Lymnaea (Viridigalba) Kruglov & Starobogatov, 1985 (a junior synonym); Orientogalba (Lenagalba) Kruglov & Starobogatov, 1985 (a junior synonym); Viridigalba Kruglov & Starobogatov, 1985 (a junior synonym)

= Orientogalba =

Genus of gastropods

Orientogalba is a genus of small air-breathing freshwater snails, aquatic gastropod mollusks in the family Lymnaeidae, the pond snails.

== Species ==
Species within this genus include:

- Orientogalba bowelli (Preston, 1909)
- Orientogalba heptapotamica (Lazareva, 1967)
- Orientogalba hokkaidoensis Aksenova, Bolotov, Vinarski, Ohari & Itagaki, 2024
- Orientogalba lenaensis (Kruglov & Starobogatov, 1985)
- Orientogalba ollula (A. A. Gould, 1859)
- Orientogalba viridis (Quoy & Gaimard, 1832)

Synonyms

- Subgenus Orientogalba (Lenagalba) Kruglov & Starobogatov, 1985: synonym of Orientogalba Kruglov & Starobogatov, 1985 (a junior synonym)
- Orientogalba hookeri (Reeve, 1850): synonym of Tibetoradix hookeri (Reeve, 1850) (a junior synonym)
- Orientogalba tumrokensis (Kruglov & Starobogatov, 1985): synonym of Ladislavella (Walterilymnaea) catascopium tumrokensis (Kruglov & Starobogatov, 1985) represented as Ladislavella catascopium tumrokensis (Kruglov & Starobogatov, 1985)
