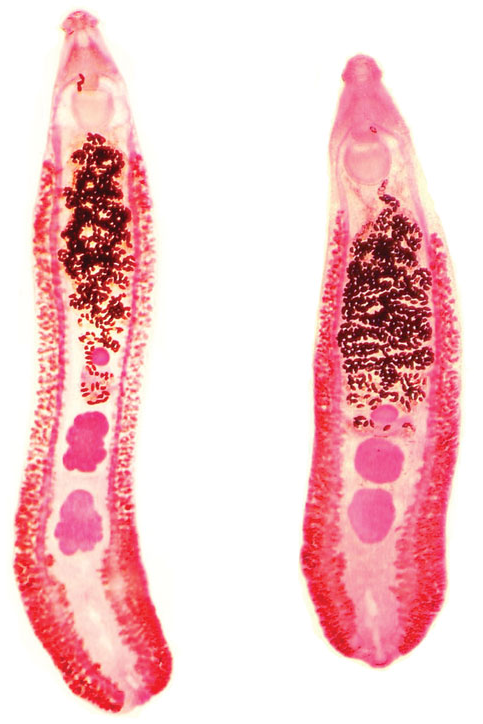
- Echinostoma revolutum

Scientific classification
- Kingdom: Animalia
- Phylum: Platyhelminthes
- Class: Trematoda
- Order: Plagiorchiida
- Suborder: Echinostomata
- Superfamily: Echinostomatoidea
- Family: Echinostomatidae; Looss, 1899

Genera
- See text

Synonyms
- Hypoderaeinae Skrjabin & Baschkirova, 1956; Parallelotestisiinae Mehra, 1980; Singhiinae Yamaguti, 1958

= Echinostomatinae =

Subfamily of flukes

Echinostomatinae is a subfamily of trematodes in the order Plagiorchiida, first described in 1899.

== Genera ==
According to the World Register of Marine Species, the following genera are accepted within Echinostomatinae:

- Bashkirovitrema Skrjabin, 1944
- Drepanocephalus Dietz, 1909
- Echinodollfusia Skrjabin & Baschkirova, 1956
- Echinoparyphium Dietz, 1909
- Echinostoma Rudolphi, 1809
- Edietziana Ozdikmen, 2013
- Euparyphium Dietz, 1909
- Hypoderaeum Dietz, 1909
- Isthmiophora Lühe, 1909
- Kostadinovatrema Dronen, 2009
- Longicollia Bychovskaja-Pavlovskaja, 1953
- Lyperorchis Travassos, 1921
- Moliniella Hübner, 1939
- Neoacanthoparyphium Yamaguti, 1958
- Pameileenia Wright & Smithers, 1956
- Parallelotestis Belopolskaya, 1954
- Petasiger Dietz, 1909
- Prionosomoides Teixeira de Freitas & Dobbin, 1967
- Singhia Yamaguti, 1958
