= Isthmiophora =

Scientific classification
- Kingdom: Animalia
- Phylum: Platyhelminthes
- Class: Trematoda
- Order: Plagiorchiida
- Family: Echinostomatidae
- Subfamily: Echinostomatinae
- Genus: Isthmiophora; Luhe, 1909

Genus of flatworms

Isthmiophora is a genus of flatworms belonging to the family Echinostomatidae.

The species of this genus are found in Europe.

Species:

- Isthmiophora melis (Schrank, 1788)
- Isthmiophora scapteromae Sutton, 1983
