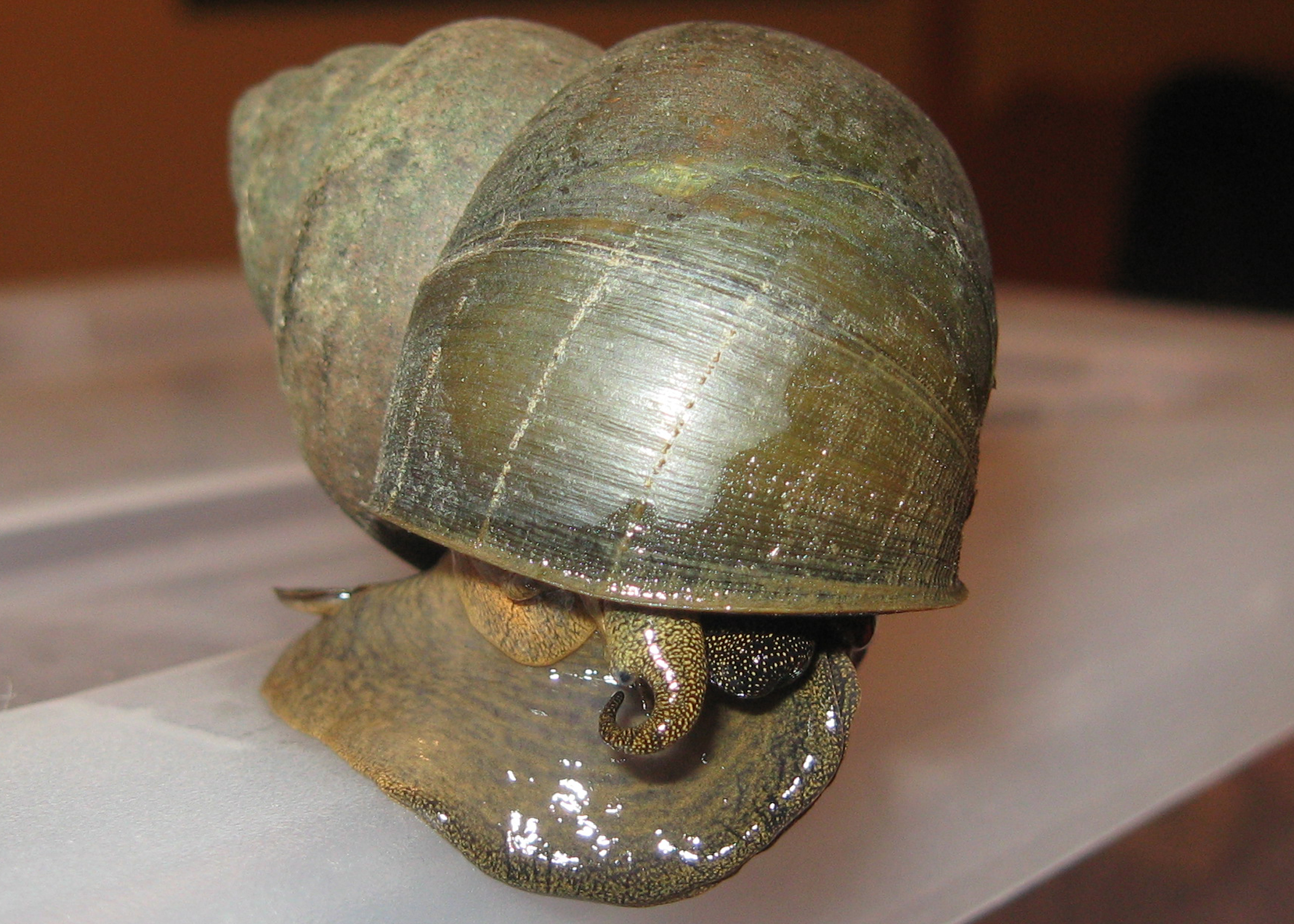
- A live individual out of water

Conservation status
- Least Concern (IUCN 3.1)

- Secure (NatureServe)

Scientific classification
- Kingdom: Animalia
- Phylum: Mollusca
- Class: Gastropoda
- Subclass: Caenogastropoda
- Order: Architaenioglossa
- Family: Viviparidae
- Genus: Margarya
- Species: M. chinensis

Binomial name
- Margarya chinensis (Gray, 1834)

Synonyms
- Paludina chinensis Gray, 1834 (original combination); Bellamya chinensis (Gray, 1834); Vivipara chinensis (Gray, 1834); Cipangopaludina chinensis (Gray, 1834); Viviparus chinensis malleatus (Reeve, 1863); Viviparus japonicus; Viviparus stelmaphora; Paludina malleata; Paludina japonicus

= Margarya chinensis =

Species of gastropod

The Chinese mystery snail, black snail, or trapdoor snail (Margarya chinensis), is a large freshwater snail with gills and an operculum, an aquatic gastropod mollusk in the family Viviparidae.

The name "trapdoor snail" refers the operculum, an oval corneous plate that most snails in this clade possess. When the soft parts of the snail are fully retracted, the operculum seals the aperture of the shell, providing some protection against drying out and predation.

== Taxonomy ==
Taxonomy of the introduced populations of Oriental mystery snails is confusing and there are many scientific names in use. There has also been debate regarding whether or not Cipangopaludina chinensis malleata and Cipangopaludina japonica in North America are synonymous and simply different phenotypes of the same species. For example USGS database considers the two as separate species. Smith (2000) argues that Cipangopaludina is a subgenus of Bellamya; however, because most North American literature does not use the genus Bellamya to refer to these introduced snails, Oriental mystery snails discussed here are referred to by the name Cipangopaludina. Literature cited in the USGS database regarding the Chinese mystery snail may employ the following names: Cipangopaludina chinensis, Cipangopaludina chinensis malleatus, Cipangopaludina chinensis malleata, Viviparus malleatus, Viviparus chinensis malleatus, Bellamya chinensis and Bellamya chinensis malleatus.

== Description ==
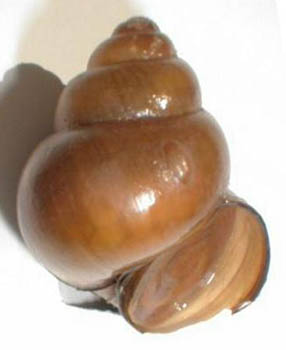
Shell of Bellamya chinensis

Species of the genus Cipangopaludina can be identified by their relatively large globose shells and concentrically marked opercula. The shell is conical and thin but solid, with a sharp apex and relatively higher spire and distant body whorl. This species has a small and round umbilicus and the spire is produced at an angle of 65–80°. Cipangopaludina chinensis exhibits light coloration as a juvenile and olive green, greenish brown, brown or reddish brown pigmentation as an adult. The inner coloration is white to pale blue.

The surface of the shell is smooth with clear growth lines. The shell has 6.0–7.0 whorls.

Bellamya chinensis is a large gastropod species generally 40 millimetres (1.6 in) in shell height and 30 millimetres (1.2 in) in shell width, the largest being 60 millimetres (2.4 in) in height and 40 millimetres (1.6 in) wide. The shell height can reach up to 65 millimetres (2.6 in). Cipangopaludina chinensis has a width to height ratio of 0.74–0.82.

The aperture is ovoid with a simple outer lip and inner lip.

In juveniles, the last shell whorl displays a distinct carina, and the shell contains grooves with 20 striae/mm between each groove. Juveniles also have a detailed pattern on their periostracum consisting of two apical and three body whorl rows of hairs with long hooks on the ends, distinct ridges and many other hairs with short hooks.

The shell of Cipangopaludina chinensis grows allometrically (the height increasing faster than the width) and does so at a decreased rate in comparison with Cipangopaludina japonica, such that the adult shell is less elongate than that of its congener. The radula also may differ between Cipangopaludina japonica and Cipangopaludina chinensis, but there is so much variation even within one species that it is not a good diagnostic characteristic. However, as a general guide, in one North American population, the radula of Cipangopaludina chinensis had seven small cusps on the marginal tooth and a large central cusp with four small cusps on either side.

Mystery snails (unlike apple snails) do not possess a siphon. They give live birth, and like all aquatic snails they only have one set of tentacles.

== Distribution ==
Though native to East Asia from the tropics of Indochina to northern China, this species has established itself in North America.

The native range is from Southeast Asia to East Asia. This species is widely distributed in China including the Chinese Loess Plateau.

=== Nonindigenous distribution ===
==== United States ====
This species was sold in Chinese food markets in San Francisco in the late 1800s. It was collected as early as 1914 in Boston. It was probably released from an aquarium into the Niagara River between 1931 and 1942.

It has become a problematic invasive species in many areas.

This snail is an introduced species in the United States. It is found in "any or all of the tributaries on Grand Island and on both sides of the Niagara River in the United States and Canada."

The nonindigenous distribution in the USA include:

- various ponds in Connecticut and Massachusetts;
- various ponds in New Hampshire;
- Potomac River, Maryland;
- Cocheco River, New Hampshire;
- Delaware River, New Jersey;
- Hudson River and Niagara River, New York;
- Schuylkill River and Susquehanna River, Pennsylvania;
- Annaquatucket River, Rhode Island;
- Lake Butte des Morts, Wisconsin
- a few isolated locations in Maine and Virginia.
- Minnesota: 80 waters known as of 2016

Great Lakes Region: The first record of Cipangopaludina chinensis malleata in the Great Lakes dates from some time between 1931 and 1942 from the Niagara River, which flows into Lake Ontario. Cipangopaludina chinensis malleata occurs in Lake Erie, where it was introduced some time prior to 1968. Cipangopaludina chinensis was found for the first time in Oneida Lake, which flows to Lake Ontario, in 1977–1978. Jokinen (1982) records occurrences of populations of Cipangopaludina chinensis in the drainages of Lake Erie, Lake Ontario and Lake Michigan, from the states of Michigan, Indiana, Ohio, Wisconsin, and New York. It was first reported from Lake Champlain in 2003.

It is regulated in Minnesota where it is illegal to release it into the wild.

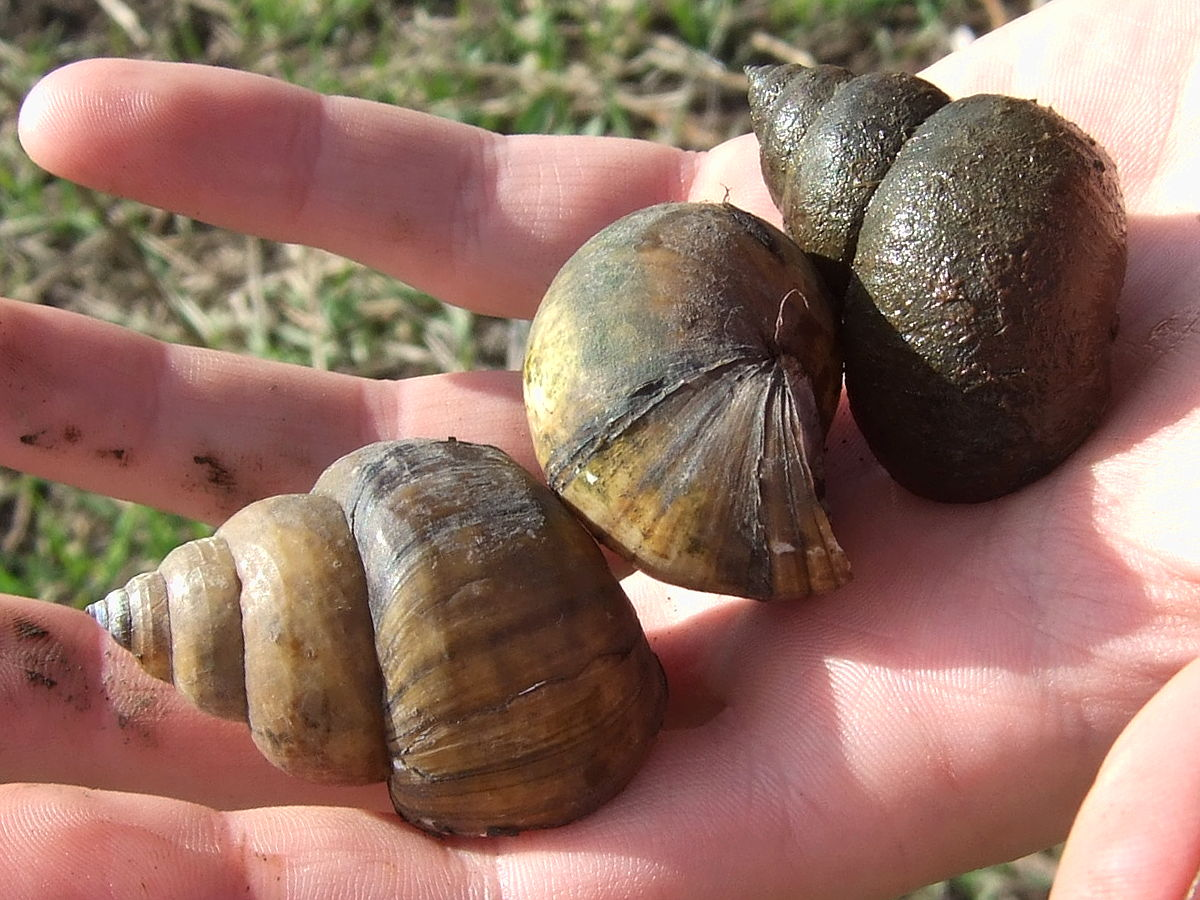
In Naperville, Illinois, USA

==== United Kingdom ====
The Chinese mystery snail was first recorded in England from a ditch in the Pevensey Levels in Sussex in September 2018 and early in 2022 a second population was reported on iNaturalist from Southampton Common. This was investigated by Natural England and the snails were found to be present in a boating lake and an ornamental lake on the Common. How the snails were introduced is unknown but it was either through release from aquaria or from snails imported for food.

==== European Union ====
The species was first recorded in a floodplain lake in the southern Netherlands in 2007, which was its first confirmed presence in Europe. By 2016, it had established 12 populations in the country and by 2022 that number had grown to 23. In 2017, a population was also discovered in Belgium which by 2022 had spread to three more nearby sites. In Spain, live C. chinensis specimens were confirmed in 2020 in the Province of Alicante, and in 2021 the species was also reported in the Arnsberg region of Germany. Its presence in scattered, isolated sites is almost certainly due to multiple and independent introductions, probably from aquarium and pond disposals or escapes from pond and garden centres.

In order to limit its spread, the European Union has included it in the list of invasive alien species of Union concern. It therefore cannot be imported, bred, transported, commercialized, or intentionally released into the environment in any of its member states.

== Ecology ==
This species prefers freshwater lakes with soft, muddy or silty bottoms, reservoirs, slow-moving freshwater rivers, streams, paddy fields, and ponds with aquatic grass, creeping at the bottom of the water or on aquatic grasses. It prefers lentic water bodies with silt, sand, and mud substrate in eastern North America, although it can survive in slower regions of streams as well. It can tolerate conditions in stagnant waters near septic tanks.

This species has been found in waters in eastern North America with pH 6.5–8.4, calcium concentration of 5–97 ppm, magnesium concentration of 13–31 ppm, oxygen concentration of 7–11 ppm, depths of 0.2–7m, conductivity of 63–400 μmhos/cm, and sodium concentration of 2–49 ppm.

The optimal water temperature for it to grow and develop is between 20 and 28 °C. It will hibernate while water temperature is lower than 10-15 °C or higher than 30 °C.

=== Feeding habits ===
Cipangopaludina chinensis feeds non-selectively on organic and inorganic bottom material as well as benthic and epiphytic algae, mostly by scraping, but diatoms are probably the most nutritious food it ingests at sites in eastern North America.

This species is primarily an algae eater in an aquarium context. These snails are popular in freshwater aquariums because they do not eat fish eggs or plants, they do not overpopulate the aquarium, and they close up if there is a water problem, giving people an indication that something is wrong a few weeks before the fish die.

=== Life cycle ===
Reproduction is initiated sexually. This species is ovoviviparous. Females live up to 5 years, while males live up to 3, occasionally 4 years. Female fecundity is usually greater than 169 young in a lifetime, and may reach up to 102 for any given brood. All females generally contain embryos from May to August and young are born from June through October in eastern North America in shallow water, then females begin migrating to deeper water for the winter in the fall. Females bear more young in their 4th and 5th years than in other years.

=== Parasites ===
Bellamya chinensis serves in its native habitat as a host and a vector to numerous parasites including:

As an intermediate host for:

- Echinochasmus elongatus
- Echinochasmus redioduplicatus
- Echinochasmus rugosus
- Eupariphium ilocanum
- Eupariphium recurvatum
- Echinostoma macrorachis
- Echinostoma cinetorchis in Korea - this parasite may infect humans.
- It is also a common host to larvae of echinostomes in the Kinmen islands.

Parasites of Bellamya chinensis include trematode Aspidogaster conchicola.

== Human use ==
This species constitutes one of the three predominant freshwater snails found in Chinese markets. This snail is extensively used as part of the human diet in most places in China because the meat of the snail is considered delicious, being rich in nutrition, with high protein and low fat content. Moreover, in China it is also used as a medicine for treatment of digestive disease.

Its shells are abundant in archaeological sites in the Guanzhong Basin of Northwestern China from the Mid-Late Neolithic age. These are remains of prehistoric meals. The flesh was eaten mainly as subsidiary food.

This snail is also one of the rice field snail species traditionally eaten in Thailand.
