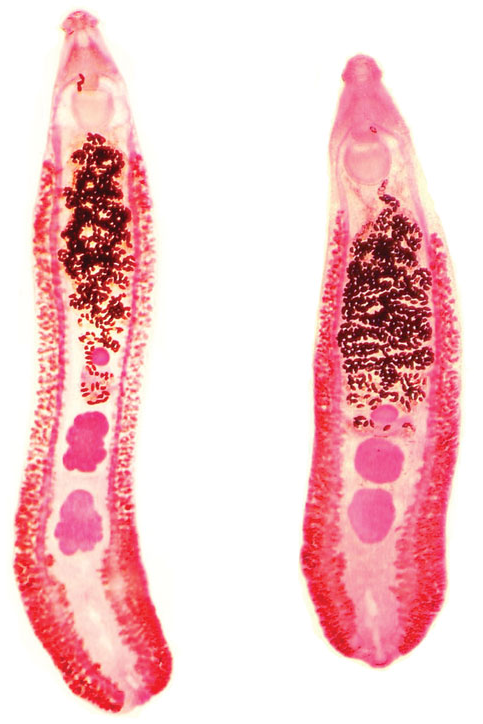
- Two specimens of Echinostoma revolutum

Scientific classification
- Kingdom: Animalia
- Phylum: Platyhelminthes
- Class: Trematoda
- Order: Plagiorchiida
- Family: Echinostomatidae
- Subfamily: Echinostomatinae
- Genus: Echinostoma; Rudolphi, 1809

= Echinostoma =

Genus of flukes

Echinostoma is a genus of trematodes (flukes), which can infect both humans and other animals. These intestinal flukes have a three-host life cycle with snails or other aquatic organisms as intermediate hosts, and a variety of animals, including humans, as their definitive hosts.

Echinostoma infect the gastrointestinal tract of humans, and can cause a disease known as echinostomiasis. The parasites are spread when humans or animals eat infected raw or undercooked food, such as bivalve molluscs or fish.

== Taxonomy ==
There has been debate about the number of species in this group, with estimates as high as 120 unique species of Echinostoma, however, currently 16 species have been accepted as valid species with another 10 to be validated Echinostoma are difficult to classify based on morphology alone. Many species look alike and can be considered cryptic species (different lineages are considered to be the same species, due to high morphological similarity between them). Many species of Echinostoma have been re-classified several times. For example, the species now known as Echinostoma caproni, was previously known by a variety of names including E. liei, E. paraensei and E. togoensis.

Methods for classifying Echinostoma species, such as the Echinostoma revolutum group, were devised by Kanev. The Echinostoma species in this group are now classified according to their shared morphological and biological characteristics, such as the presence of 37 collar spines.

Molecular methods, such as sequencing mitochondrial DNA and ribosomal DNA, are also used to distinguish between species of Echinostoma as an alternative to morphological classification methods.

=== Species ===
Phylogeny of most known Echinostoma species based on the mitochondrial nad1 sequences:

- Echinostoma
  - - - - - - - - - - E. mekongi Cho, Jung, Chang, Sohn, Sinuon & Chai, 2020
                    - E. deserticum Kechemir, Jourdane & Mas-Coma, 2002
                  - E. paraulum Dietz, 1909
                - E. cinetorchis Ando & Ozaki, 1923
              - E. robustum Yamaguti, 1935
            - E. miyagawai Ishii, 1932
          - E. novaezealandense Georgieva, Blasco-Costa & Kostadinova, 2017
        - E. revolutum (Froehlich, 1802)
      - E. caproni Richard, 1964 (previously E. liei)
    - - E. trivolvis (Cort, 1914) Kanev, 1985
      - - E. paraensei Lie & Basch, 1967
        - E. nasincovae Faltýnková, Georgieva, Soldánová & Kostadinova, 2015
  - E. bolschewense (Kotova, 1939) Našincová, 1991

Further confirmed species are E. lindoense Sandground & Bonne, 1940 and E. luisreyi Maldonado, Vieira & Lanfredi, 2003, these are not included in the phylogeny because of a lack of genetic material. Unconfirmed species are E. acuticauda, E. barbosai, E. chloephagae, E. echinatum, E. jurini, E. nudicaudatum, E. parvocirrus, E. pinnicaudatum, E. ralli, and E. rodriguesi.

== Morphology ==
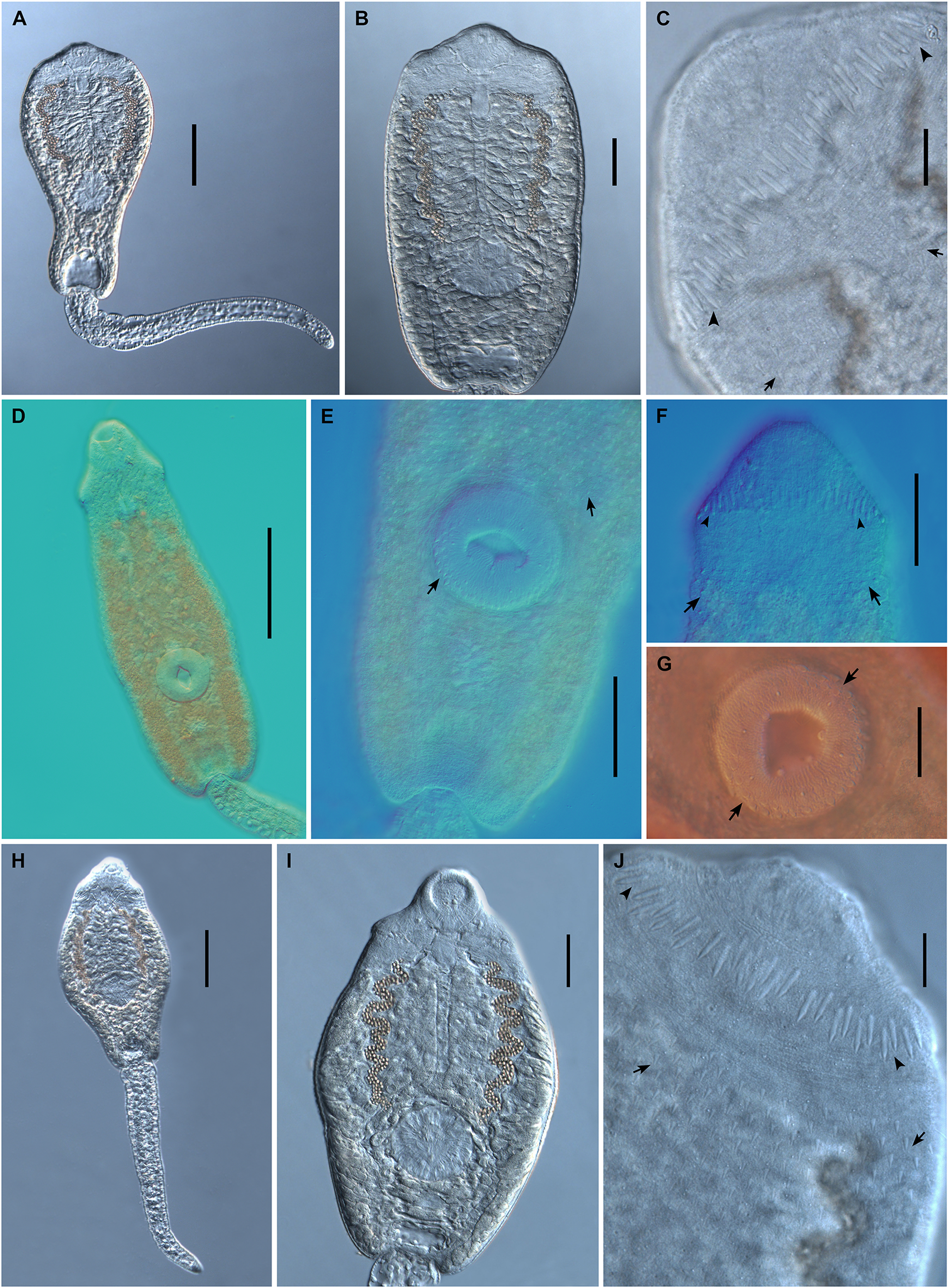
Cercariae of various echinostome species

Echinostoma are internal digenean trematode parasites which infect the intestines and bile duct of their hosts.

The length and width of adult Echinostoma varies between species, but they tend to be approximately 2–10 mm × 1–2 mm in size.

Adult Echinostoma have two suckers: an anterior oral sucker and a ventral sucker. They also have a characteristic head collar with spines surrounding their oral sucker. The number of collar spines varies between Echinostoma species, but there are usually between 27 and 51. These spines can be arranged in one or two circles around the sucker, and their arrangement may be a characteristic feature of an Echinostoma species.

Echinostoma have a digestive system consisting of a pharynx, oesophagus and an excretory pore.

Echinostoma are hermaphrodites, and have both male and female reproductive organs. The testes are found in the posterior part of the fluke's body, in the area furthest from the mouth. The ovary is also found in this location, close to the testes.

The eggs (ova) of Echinostoma are operculate and vary in size, but are typically in the range of 80–135 × 55–80 μm.

== Geographic distribution ==
The genus Echinostoma has a global distribution. These parasites are particularly common in South East Asia, in countries such as South Korea and the Philippines. However, they are also found in some European countries, and species such as Echinostoma trivolvis are found in North America.

== Life cycle ==
Echinostoma have three hosts in their life cycle: a first intermediate host, a second intermediate host and a definitive host. Snail species such as Lymnaea spp. are common intermediate hosts for Echinostoma, although fish and other bivalve molluscs can also be intermediate hosts for these parasites.

Echinostoma species have low specificity for their definitive hosts, and can infect a variety of different species of animal, including amphibians, aquatic birds, mammals and humans. A definitive host which is infected with Echinostoma will shed unembryonated Echinostoma eggs in their faeces. When the eggs are in contact with fresh water they may become embryonated, and will then hatch and release miracidia. The miracidia stage of Echinostoma is free-swimming, and actively penetrates the first intermediate snail host, which then becomes infected.

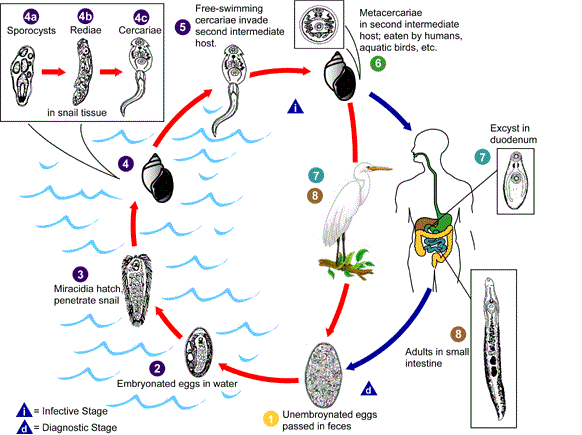
Life cycle of Echinostoma.

In the first intermediate host, the miracidium undergoes asexual reproduction for several weeks, which includes sporocyst formation, a few generations of rediae and the production of cercariae. The cercariae are released from the snail host into water and are also free-swimming. The cercariae penetrate a second intermediate host, or they remain in the first intermediate host, where they form metacercariae. Definitive hosts become infected by eating secondary hosts which are infected with metacercariae. Once the metacercariae have been eaten, they excyst in the intestine of the definitive host where the parasite then develops into an adult.

Echinostoma are hermaphrodites. A single adult individual has both male and female reproductive organs, and is capable of self-fertilization. Sexual reproduction of adult Echinostoma in the definitive host leads to the production of unembryonated eggs. The life cycle of Echinostoma is temperature dependent, and occurs quicker at higher temperatures. Echinostoma eggs can survive for about 5 months and still have the ability to hatch and develop into the next life cycle stage.

== Echinostomiasis ==
Infection of humans with members of the family Echinostomatidae, including Echinostoma, can lead to a disease called echinostomiasis. E. revolutum, E. echinatum, E. malaynum and E. hortense are particularly common causes of Echinostoma infections in humans. Humans can become infected with Echinostoma by eating infected raw or undercooked food, particularly fish, clams and snails. Infection with these parasites tends to be common in regions where cultural dishes require the use of raw or undercooked food that may be infected with Echinostoma. A mild infection may not have any symptoms. If symptoms are present they can include abdominal pain, diarrhoea, tiredness and weight loss.

=== Epidemiology of echinostomiasis ===
Echinostomiasis is endemic in South East Asia and the Far East, in countries including China, Korea, Taiwan, Philippines, Malaysia, Indonesia and India. Echinostomiasis has also been reported in Japan, Singapore, Romania, Hungary and Italy. The prevalence of echinostomiasis varies between countries but there tend to be foci of infection in areas where raw or undercooked hosts of Echinostoma, such as snails or fish, are widely consumed.

=== Pathogenesis ===
Echinostoma are not highly pathogenic. Symptoms of greater severity tend to be seen in an echinostomiasis infection where there is a higher number of flukes. The flukes cause damage to the intestinal mucosa, which leads to ulceration and inflammation.

=== Diagnosis ===
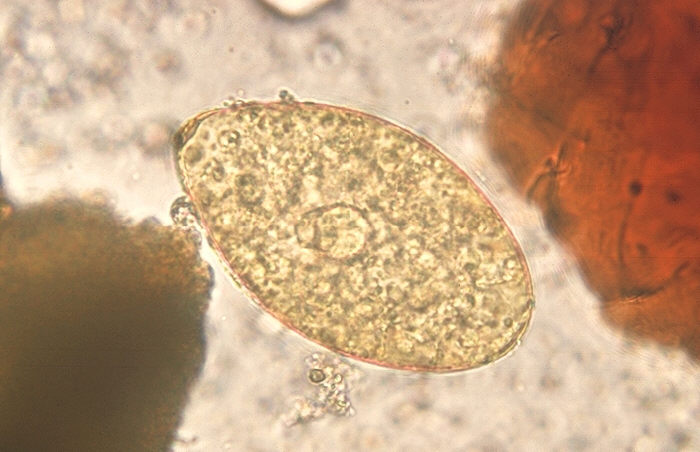
Unstained Echinostoma egg.

An Echinostoma infection can be diagnosed by observing the parasite eggs in the faeces of an infected individual, under a microscope. Methods such as the Kato-Katz procedure can be used to do this. The eggs typically have a yellow-brown appearance, and are ellipsoid in shape. To confirm which species is causing the infection adult worms must be recovered from the infected individual, such as with anthelmintic treatment.

=== Treatment and prevention ===
Echinostomiasis can be treated with the anthelmintic drug praziquantel, as for other intestinal trematode infections. Side effects of anthelmintic drug treatment may include nausea, abdominal pain, headaches or dizziness. Echinostomiasis can be controlled at the same time as other food-borne parasite infections, using existing control programmes. Interrupting the parasite's lifecycle by efficient diagnosis and subsequent treatment of infected individuals, and preventing reinfection, may help to control this disease. As echinostomiasis is acquired through the consumption of raw or undercooked infected food, cooking food thoroughly will prevent infection.
