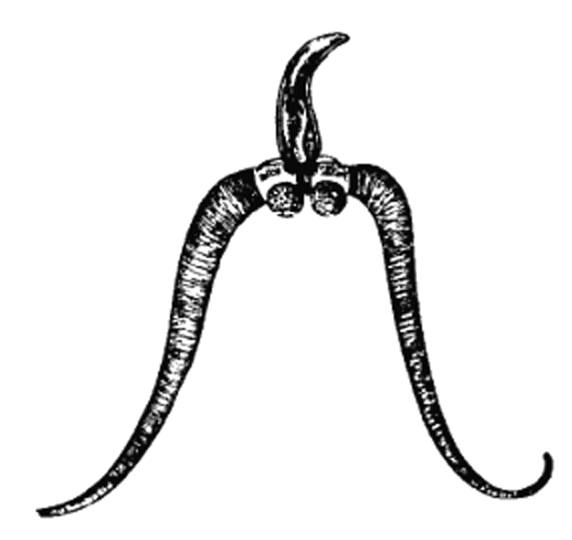
- Cercaria larva of Bucephalus polymorphus from Encyclopædia Britannica, Eleventh Edition

Scientific classification
- Domain: Eukaryota
- Kingdom: Animalia
- Phylum: Platyhelminthes
- Class: Trematoda
- Order: Plagiorchiida
- Family: Bucephalidae
- Genus: Bucephalus; Baer, 1827

Species
- Bucephalus anguillae Spakulova, Macko, Berrilli & Dezfuli, 2002; Bucephalus baeri Maillard, 1976; Bucephalus binidentacularis Wang, 1977; Bucephalus elegans Woodhead, 1930; Bucephalus haimeanus (Lacaze-Duthiers, 1854); Bucephalus labracis Paggi & Orecchia, 1965; Bucephalus marinus Vlasenko, 1931; Bucephalus mytili Cole, 1935; Bucephalus polymorphus Baer, 1827

= Bucephalus (flatworm) =

Genus of flukes

Bucephalus (lit. 'ox head') is the genus name for many trematode flatworms that are parasites of molluscs and fish. Like other Bucephalidae, they are found in fish both as adults and as metacercariae. In marine and freshwater teleosts, they live as parasites inside the digestive tract, especially the intestine.

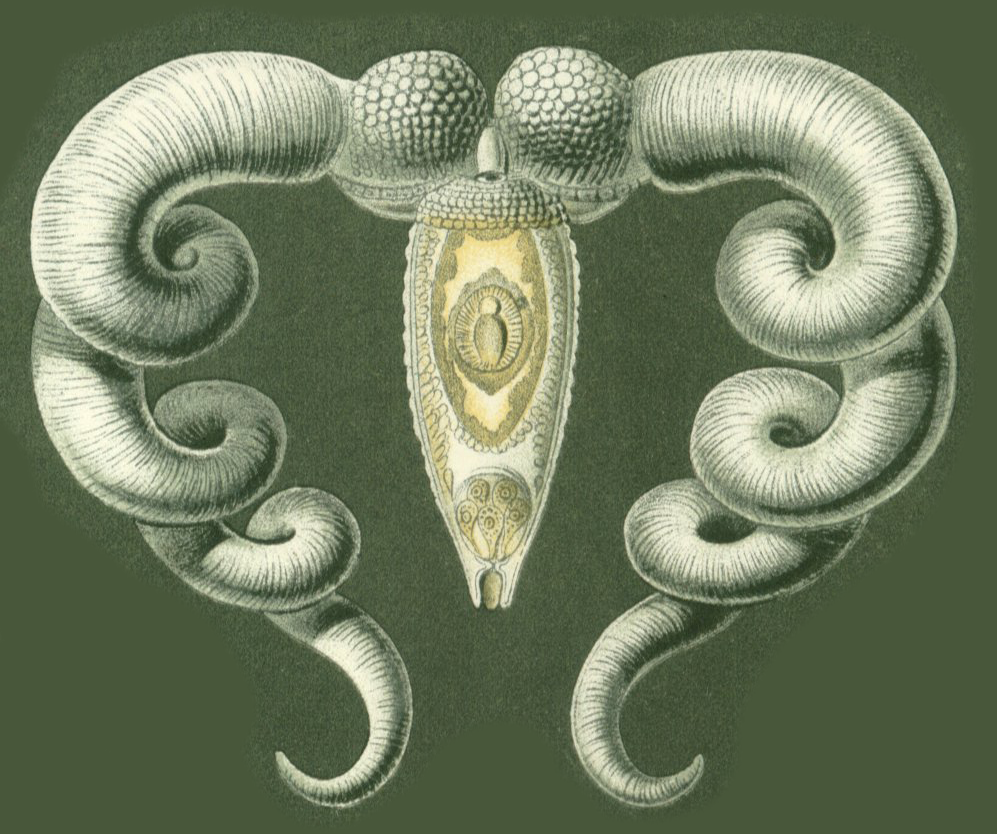
Bucephalid cercaria larva from Ernst Haeckel's Kunstformen der Natur (1904) The tail's furcae give the impression of horns, hence the genus name Bucephalus (lit. 'ox head').

The genus Bucephalus was based on the earliest known bucephalid, B. polymorphus Baer (1827), initially described from a cercaria larva. Siebold (1848) believed that the adult bucephalid he named Gasterostomum fimbriatum represented an adult form of the same bucephalid, but this identity has never been proved.

The name Bucephalus (lit. 'ox head') was chosen because of the horn-like appearance of the forked tail (furcae) of its cercaria. By what Manter calls a "curious circumstance", horns are also suggested by the long tentacles of adult worms.

They are distinguished from other genera in the same family by having tentacles associated with the anterior sucker. Genus members have their mouth in the middle of the body.

An earlier name for this genus was Gasterostomum, given by von Siebold in 1848 to all adult trematodes with a ventral mouth. Odhner (1905) established two suborders of digenean trematodes called Gasterostomata and Protostomata. The two genera in Gasterostomata were Gasterostomum (now Bucephalus) and Prosorhynchus, of which the former has an anterior sucker separate from its digestive tract and the latter has an anterior rhynchus. Members of the genus Bucephalus are also sometimes referred to as "gasterostomes."
