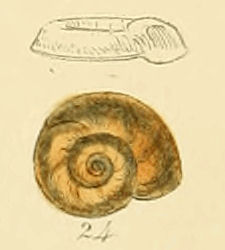
- Drawing of shell of Hippeutis complanatus

Scientific classification
- Kingdom: Animalia
- Phylum: Mollusca
- Class: Gastropoda
- Superorder: Hygrophila
- Family: Planorbidae
- Tribe: Segmentinini
- Genus: Hippeutis; Charpentier, 1837

= Hippeutis =

Genus of gastropods

Hippeutis is a genus of minute air-breathing freshwater snails, aquatic pulmonate gastropod mollusks or micromollusks in the family Planorbidae, the ramshorn snails.

Albrecht et al. (2007) have confirmed its placement in the tribe Segmentinini within subfamily Planorbinae.

== Species ==
Species within the genus Hippeutis include:

- Hippeutis complanatus (Linnaeus, 1758) - type species of the genus Hippeutis
- Hippeutis badae (Bollinger, 1914) (uncertain > taxon inquirendum)
- Hippeutis stossichi (Clessin, 1881) (uncertain > taxon inquirendum)

Fossil species

- †Hippeutis acuticarinatus (Dunker, 1853)
- †Hippeutis ambiguus (Deshayes, 1863)
- †Hippeutis applanatus X.-H. Yu, 1987
- †Hippeutis bajandaicus (Popova, 1981)
- †Hippeutis bureaui (Cossmann, 1919)
- †Hippeutis chertieri (Deshayes, 1863)
- †Hippeutis clathratus (G.-X. Zhu, 1980)
- †Hippeutis discotus (G.-X. Zhu, 1980)
- †Hippeutis eysdenensis (Vincent, 1930)
- †Hippeutis fasciatus Gottschick, 1920
- †Hippeutis headonensis (Jodot, 1942)
- †Hippeutis inflatus (Deshayes, 1825)
- †Hippeutis langxiensis Pan, 1982
- †Hippeutis lens (Brongniart, 1810)
- †Hippeutis luminosa Yü, 1965
- †Hippeutis muzzolonicus (Oppenheim, 1895)
- †Hippeutis obtusus (J.Sowerby, 1816)
- †Hippeutis patella (F.Sandberger, 1871)
- †Hippeutis rouvillei (Matheron, 1868)
- †Hippeutis rouxi (Noulet, 1863)
- †Hippeutis sowerbyi (Bronn, 1838)
- †Hippeutis subfontanus (Clessin, 1877)
- †Hippeutis ungeri (Reuss, 1849)
- †Hippeutis vicentinus (Oppenheim, 1895)
