= Miracidium =

Trematode life cycle stage

The miracidium is the second stage in the life cycle of trematodes. When trematode eggs are laid and come into contact with fresh water, they hatch and release miracidium. In this phase, miracidia are ciliated and free-swimming. This stage is completed upon coming in contact with, and entering into, a suitable intermediate host for the purposes of asexual reproduction. Many different species of Trematoda exist, expressing some variation in the physiology and appearance of the miracidia. The various trematode species implement similar strategies to increase their chances of locating and colonizing a new host.

== Anatomy ==
=== Hirudinella ventricosa ===
The trematode Hirudinella ventricosa releases eggs in strings. Each egg contains a single miracidium, while the string contains living spermatozoa. Miracidia have cilia that are only present in the upper portion of the body near an apical gland with 12 hook-like spines in the opening.

=== Echinostoma paraensei ===
Miracidia usually need to enter a Mollusca host before they can start growing and begin reproduction, however certain species can use other animals as intermediate or main hosts. Echinostoma paraensei miracidia have 18 plates along the outside of their body.

Even when about to hatch, their eggs show no signs of specialization such as projection or spine-like structure. They have elongated bodies with one intraepidermal ridge in the anterior row. They display a single "excretory vesicle".

The miracidia are oval-shaped and their body is almost entirely covered in cilia except for the most anterior portions, taken up by "apical papilla". The miracidia have four papillae on each side, which contain sensory hairs. They each have an apical gland that leads to the apical papilla. They have four rows of epidermal plates, with row two made up of eight plates, while the other three rows each have six. Their eyespots are dark brown and shaped like an inverted capital letter L, located between the first and second row of plates. A single "large cephalic ganglion" along with several smaller nuclei, make up the nervous system.

== Physiology ==
Miracidia do not feed. Their sole purpose is to locate and colonize a host. The ability and efficiency of miracidia to find a host is a crucial factor in the growth and success of later life stages.

Schistosome miracidia follow a three-phase process when searching for a host. In phase one, the miracidia use light and gravitational stimuli to concentrate in areas that are likely attractive to snail hosts. The second phase consists of randomly moving around. In phase three miracidia begin approaching their host target and preparing to penetrate it while responding to chemical stimuli.

Chemosensitivity plays a large role in the search for a host, but it is not specific enough to find only those species that are suitable hosts. Carbohydrates along the surface of the miracidia interact with the lectins produced by gastropods. The organization and number of these carbohydrates shift as the miracidia begin their transition to the next step in their development. Certain carbohydrates are bound all over the body of the sporocyst stage but have only been found to be present on the "intercellular ridges" of the miracidia.

Three glands within the apical papilla assist them in this process. They use glandular secretions that collect in an indented area of the papilla, as a means of both sticking to the host they are attempting to invade, and breaking down the cells on the outside of the host organism to gain entry into it.

As the miracidium develops, germ cells begin to form and then replicate into germ balls. Each of the germ balls grows and eventually contributes to the next asexual generation. The miracidium itself can differentiate into a replicative primary sporocyst as it sheds its epidermal plates within the snail intermediate host. Trematodes may have varying numbers of asexual generations and larval forms, but share a cercarial stage.
