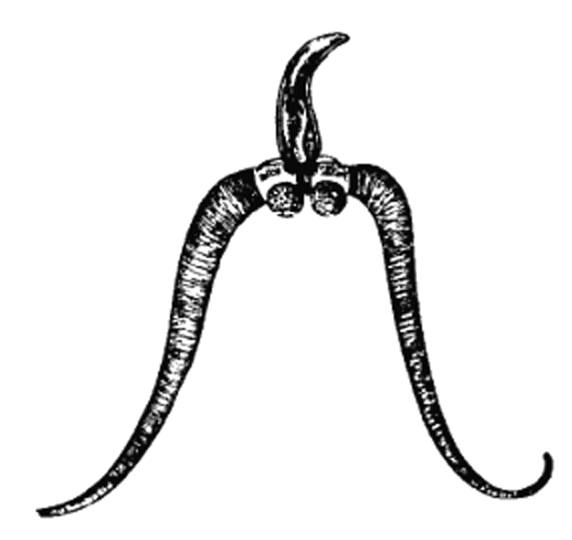
- Cercaria larva of Bucephalus polymorphus from Encyclopædia Britannica, Eleventh Edition

Scientific classification
- Kingdom: Animalia
- Phylum: Platyhelminthes
- Class: Trematoda
- Order: Plagiorchiida
- Suborder: Bucephalata
- Superfamily: Bucephaloidea
- Family: Bucephalidae; Poche, 1907

= Bucephalidae =

Family of flukes

Bucephalidae is a family of trematodes that parasitize fish. They lack suckers, having instead a muscular organ called a "rhynchus" at the front end which they use to attach to their hosts. The characteristics of the rhynchus are used to help define the genera of the family. It is one of the largest digenean families, with 25 genera containing hundreds of described species. Bucephalids are cosmopolitan, having been recorded all over the world. They are parasites of fish from freshwater, marine, and brackish water habitat types.

The name Bucephalus, meaning "ox head", was originally applied to the genus Bucephalus because of the horn-like appearance of the forked tail (furcae) of its cercaria larva. By what Manter calls a "curious circumstance", horns are also suggested by the long tentacles of adult worms.

These flatworms typically occur in teleost fishes as sexually reproducing adults. In their intermediate hosts, which include mollusks and at least one amphibian, they occur as asexually reproducing stages.

The characteristic feature is an anterior rhyncus or holdfast that is separate from the digestive system. They also differ from other digeneans in the configuration of the digestive systems and genitalia. The intestine is simple and saccular; they have no acetabulum.

The spermatozoa of adult bucephalids has been studied by transmission electron microscopy in several species belonging to the Bucephalinae and Prosorhynchinae, but, in the absence of data on the three other subfamilies, these studies could not provide information on the phylogenetic relationships within the family.

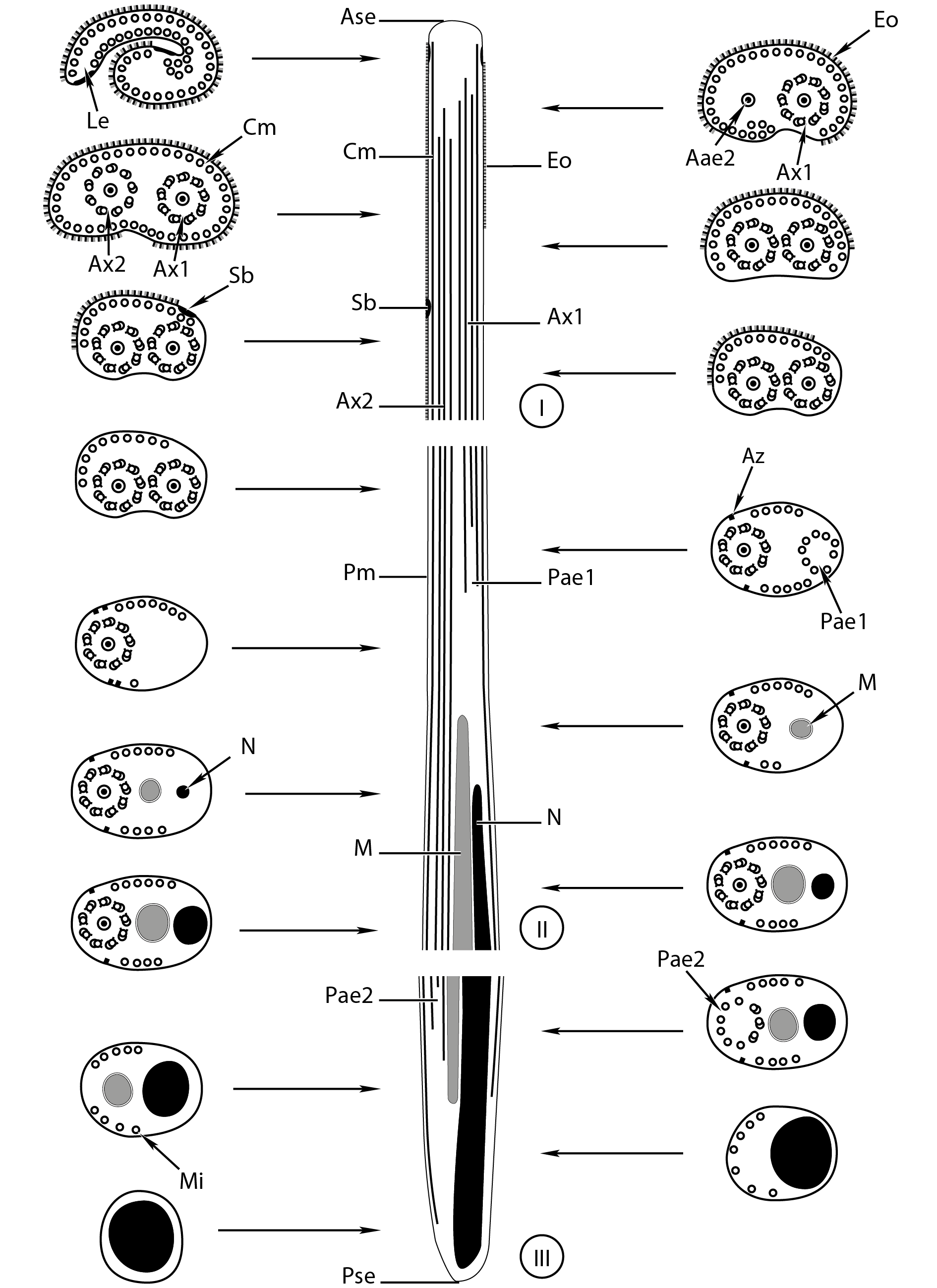
A schematic reconstruction of the mature spermatozoon of a bucephalid

== Genera ==
The genera are organised by their subfamilies.

- Bucephalinae Poche, 1907
  - Alcicornis MacCallum, 1917
  - Bucephalus von Baer, 1827
  - Glandulorhynchus Thatcher, 1999
  - Parabucephalopsis Tang & Tang, 1976
  - Prosorhynchoides Dollfus, 1929
  - Pseudobucephalopsis Long & Lee, 1964
  - Pseudorhipidocotyle Wang & Pan in Long & Lee, 1964
  - Rhipidocotyle Diesing, 1858
  - Rhipidocotyloides Long & Lee, 1964
  - Roparhynchus Gupta & Kumari, 1978
- Dolichoenterinae Yamaguti, 1958
  - Dolichoenterum Ozaki, 1924
  - Grammatorcynicola Bott & Cribb, 2005
  - Pseudodolichoenterum Yamaguti, 1971
- Heterobucephalopsinae Nolan, Curran, Miller, Cutmore, Cantacessi & Cribb, 2015
  - Heterobucephalopsis Gu & Shen, 1983
- Paurorhynchinae Dickerman, 1954
  - Bellumcorpus Kohn, 1962
  - Paurorhynchus Dickerman, 1954
  - Rhoporhynchus Wang, 1995
- Prosorhynchinae Nicoll, 1914
  - Dollfustrema Eckmann, 1934
  - Muraenicola Nolan & Cribb, 2010
  - Myorhynchus Durio & Manter, 1968
  - Neidhartia Nagaty, 1937
  - Neoprosorhynchus Dayal, 1948
  - Prosorhynchus Odhner, 1905
  - Pseudoprosorhynchus Yamaguti, 1938
  - Telorhynchus Crowcroft, 1947
