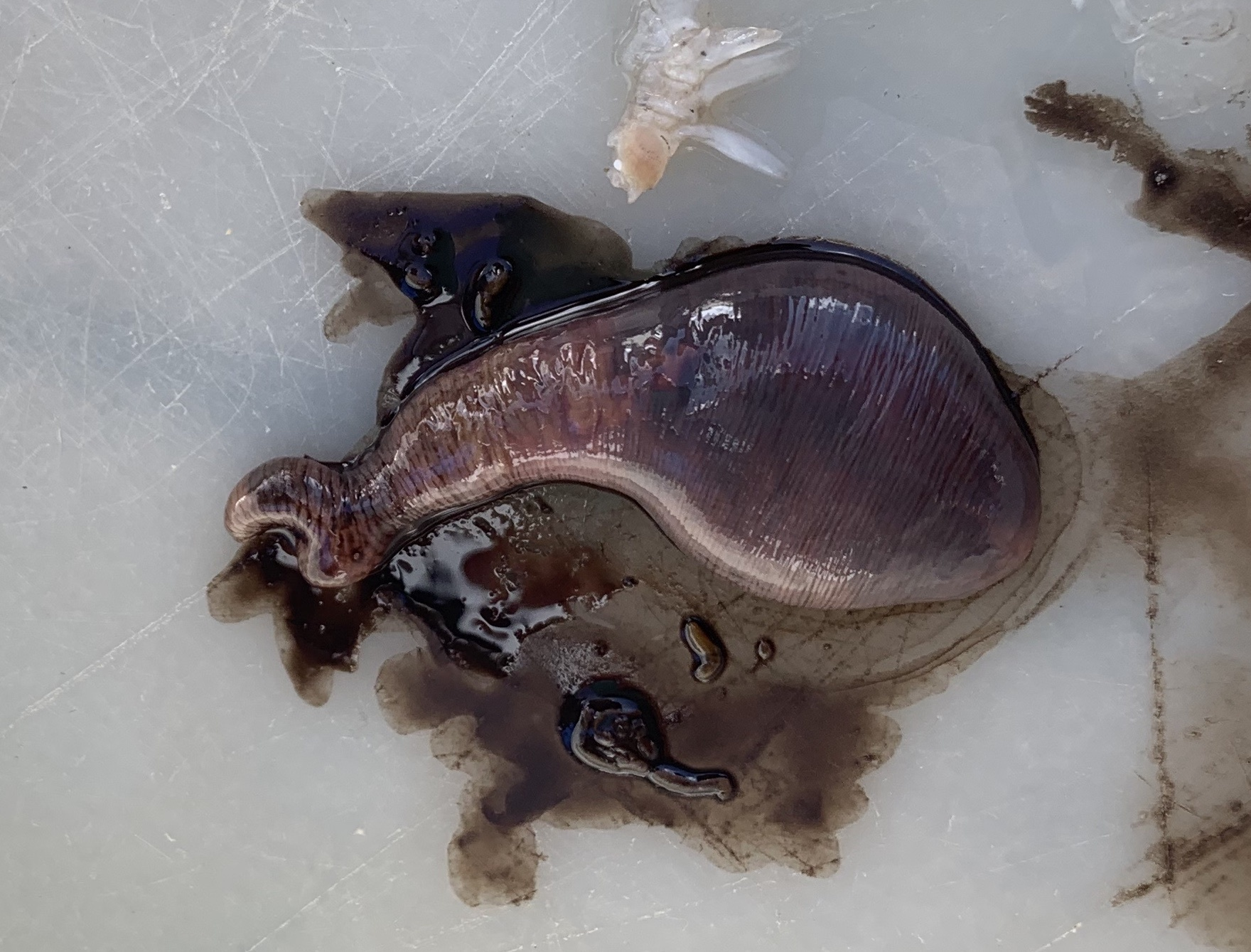

Scientific classification
- Domain: Eukaryota
- Kingdom: Animalia
- Phylum: Platyhelminthes
- Class: Trematoda
- Order: Plagiorchiida
- Family: Hirudinellidae
- Genus: Hirudinella
- Species: H. ventricosa

Binomial name
- Hirudinella ventricosa (Pallas, 1774) Baird, 1853

= Hirudinella ventricosa =

Species of Trematoda

Hirudinella ventricosa is a species of Plagiorchiida in the family Hirudinellidae.
