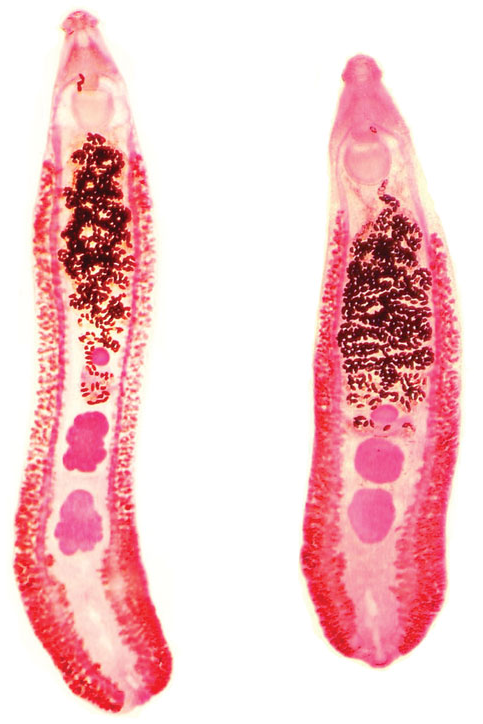

Scientific classification
- Kingdom: Animalia
- Phylum: Platyhelminthes
- Class: Trematoda
- Order: Plagiorchiida
- Suborder: Echinostomata
- Superfamily: Echinostomatoidea
- Family: Echinostomatidae; Looss, 1899

Synonyms
- Cathaemasiidae Fuhrmann, 1928

= Echinostomatidae =

Family of flukes

Echinostomatidae is a family of trematodes in the order Plagiorchiida, first described in 1899.

== Subdivisions ==
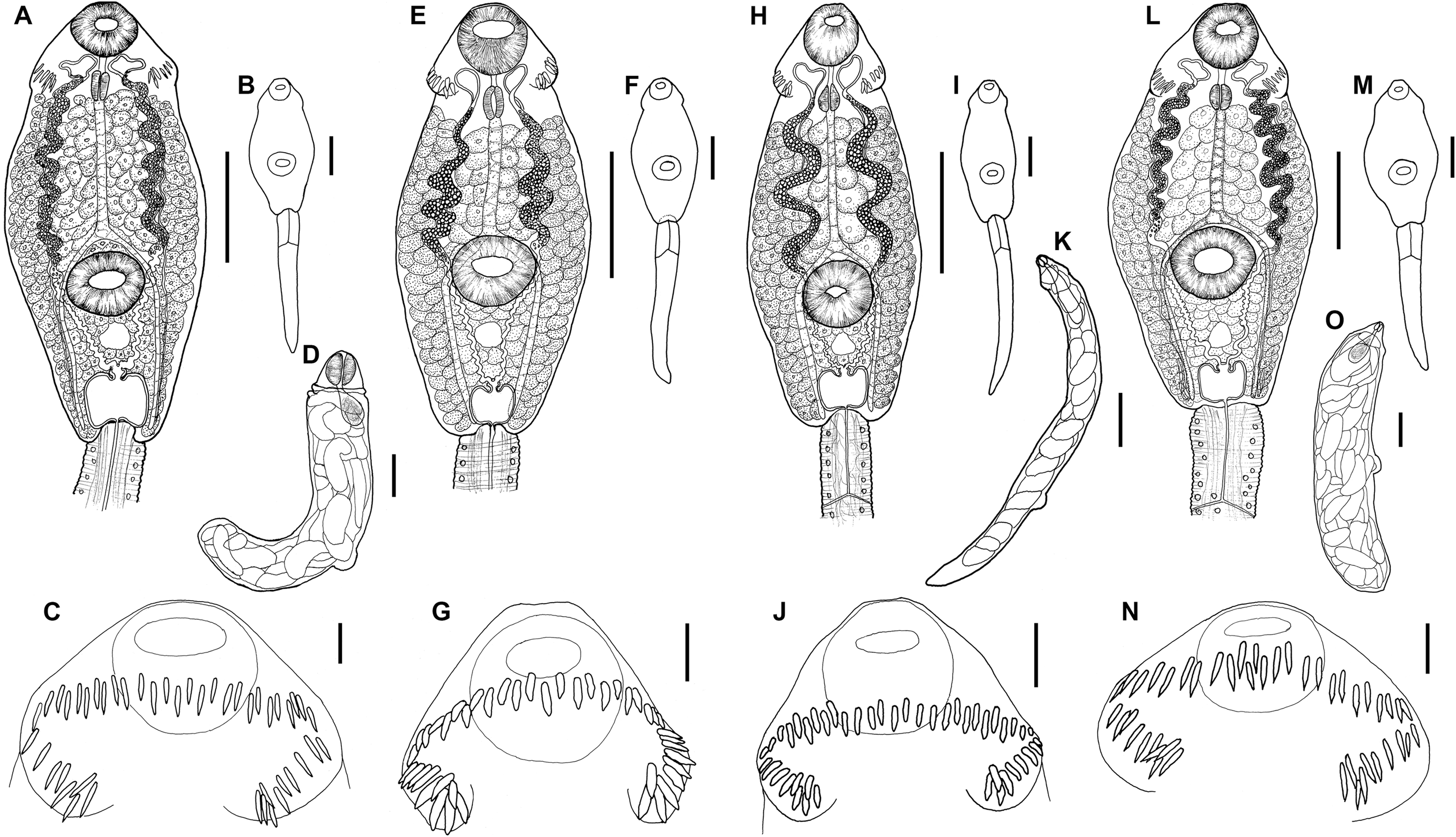
Drawings of cercariae of various Echinostomatidae

The World Register of Marine Species currently shows a total of 33 genera accepted within Echinostomatidae, subdivided across eight subfamilies, with five genera unplaced.

- Echinostomatinae Looss, 1899
  - Bashkirovitrema Skrjabin, 1944
  - Drepanocephalus Dietz, 1909
  - Echinodollfusia Skrjabin & Baschkirova, 1956
  - Echinoparyphium Dietz, 1909
  - Echinostoma Rudolphi, 1809
  - Edietziana Ozdikmen, 2013
  - Euparyphium Dietz, 1909
  - Hypoderaeum Dietz, 1909
  - Isthmiophora Lühe, 1909
  - Kostadinovatrema Dronen, 2009
  - Longicollia Bychovskaja-Pavlovskaja, 1953
  - Lyperorchis Travassos, 1921
  - Moliniella Hübner, 1939
  - Neoacanthoparyphium Yamaguti, 1958
  - Pameileenia Wright & Smithers, 1956
  - Parallelotestis Belopolskaya, 1954
  - Petasiger Dietz, 1909
  - Prionosomoides Teixeira de Freitas & Dobbin, 1967
  - Singhia Yamaguti, 1958
- Guaicapuriinae Nasir, Diaz & Marcano, 1971
  - Guaicaipuria Nasir, Diaz & Marcano, 1971
  - Protechinostoma Beaver, 1943
- Ignaviinae Yamaguti, 1958
  - Ignavia Teixeira de Freitas, 1948
- Nephrostominae Mendheim, 1943
  - Nephrostomum Dietz, 1909
  - Patagifer Dietz, 1909
- Pegosominae Odhner, 1910
  - Pegosomum Ratz, 1903
- Pelmatostominae Yamaguti, 1958
  - Pelmatostomum Dietz, 1909
- Ruffetrematinae Kostadinova, 2005
  - Ruffetrema Saxena & Singh, 1982
- Sodalinae Skrjabin & Schulz, 1937
  - Sodalis Kowalewski, 1902
- Echinostomatidae unplaced genera
  - Cathaemasia Looss, 189
  - Neopetasiger Baschkirova, 1941
  - Pseudocathaemasioides Saito & Fukumoto, 1972
  - Pulchrosoma Travassos, 1916
  - Skrjabinophora Baschkirova, 1941
