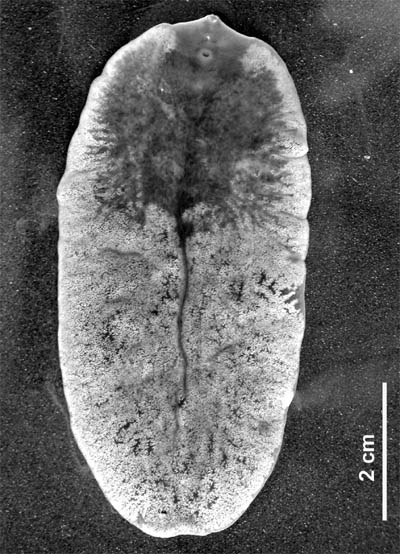

Scientific classification
- Kingdom: Animalia
- Phylum: Platyhelminthes
- Class: Trematoda
- Order: Plagiorchiida
- Family: Fasciolidae
- Genus: Fascioloides
- Species: F. magna

Binomial name
- Fascioloides magna Bassi, 1875

= Fascioloides magna =

Giant liver fluke

Species of fluke

Fascioloides magna, also known as giant liver fluke, large American liver fluke or deer fluke, is trematode parasite that occurs in wild and domestic ruminants in North America and Europe. Adult flukes occur in the liver of the definitive host and feed on blood. Mature flukes measure 4 to 10 centimetres (1 1/2 to 4 in) in length × 2 to 3.5 centimetres (3/4 to 1 3/8 in) in width, and have an oval dorso-ventrally flattened body with oral and ventral sucker. The flukes are reddish-brown in colour and are covered by tegument. As with other digenean trematodes, the life cycle includes intramolluscan phase in snails. The parasite is currently distributed in wild ruminants in North America and Europe, including Austria, Canada, the Czech Republic, Croatia, Germany, Hungary, Italy, Poland, Serbia, Slovakia, and the United States.

== History ==
Fascioloides magna is essentially of North American origin but the parasite was introduced into Europe with imported game animals at the second half of the 19th century. In spite of being native to North America the fluke was first described in Italy. In 1875, Bassi observed massive deaths of red deer in the Royal Park (now La Mandria Regional Park) near Turin, Italy. The signs were similar to well known fasciolosis in sheep. He named it Distomum magnum. The author believed that the parasite was introduced into the park in wapiti imported from the United States in 1865. Most workers did not accept Bassi's species because of his poor description. From 1882 to 1892, the fluke was recorded from different areas of the United States and described separately by many authors. Later, Stiles (1894) pointed out that the American findings are identical with species described previously by Bassi. Stiles made a complete morphological description of the adult fluke and named it Fasciola magna (Bassi 1875) Stiles 1894. In 1917, Ward showed that owing to the lack of the distinct anterior cone and the fact that vitellaria are confined to the region ventral to the intestinal branches, he established a new genus Fascioloides and rename it to Fascioloides magna (Bassi 1875) Ward 1917. In 1895, Stiles suggested that the life cycle of the fluke is very similar to Fasciola hepatica, i.e. it includes an aquatic snail as an intermediate host. He gave a comparative description of the egg and miracidium of the fluke. However, first reported intermediate hosts of F. magna were not published until 1930's. The complete life cycle of F. magna, including a description of all the larval stages, was described by Swales (1935) in Canada.

== Life cycle ==
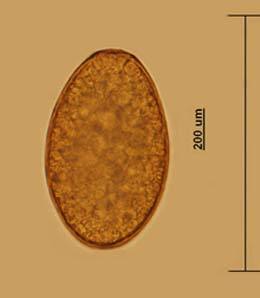
The egg of F. magna.

The life cycle of F. magna is relatively complex and is similar to the development of the related fluke, F. hepatica. A detailed account of the F. magna life cycle was given by Swales (1935), Erhardová-Kotrlá (1971), and reviewed by Pybus (2001).

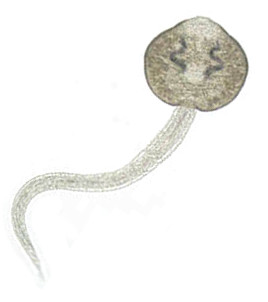
The cercariae of F. magna shed from the snail

Adult flukes occur in pairs or groups within a fibrous capsule in the liver parenchyma of the definitive host. Mature flukes release eggs which are collected in the cavity of the capsule. The capsule contains a great mass of eggs and has duct connections to bile ducts. The eggs are passed together with bile into the bile collecting system, enter the small intestine, and leave the definitive host along with the faeces. The eggs which are passed out in the faeces into the environment are undeveloped and undergo embryonation outside the host. Several physical-chemical factors, especially temperature, humidity and oxygen tension, are known to influence embryonation. During the embryonation of the egg, a larva called a miracidium develops from germinal cells. Fully developed miracidium releases the operculum of the egg using several proteases. The embryonation period varies from 27 to 44 days in natural conditions. Ciliated miracidia hatch in water and actively seek suitable intermediate hosts that are freshwater snails from family Lymnaeidae. After attaching to a suitable snail host, the miracidium penetrates into the snail body. After shedding its ciliated cell layer it is called a sporocyst. The sporocysts are found in the foot, the snail body, digestive glands, reproductive organs, and in the pulmonary sac of the snail. The sporocysts contain germinal cells that give rise to 1–6 mother rediae (a trematode larval form with an oral sucker). Developed mother rediae are released from the sporocyst and migrate into digestive glands, renal organ, reproductive organs, and pulmonary sac of the snail body. Each mother redia can asexually produce up to 10 daughter rediae. However, only 3 to 6 daughter rediae complete their development and leave the mother rediae. In turn, each daughter redia may produce 1–6 cercariae in experimentally infected snails and 16–22 cercariae under natural conditions. Cercariae emerge from the rediae and mature usually in digestive glands of the snail. Mature cercariae spontaneously emerge from the snail host and swim actively in water for up to two hours before encysting on vegetation. After encystment the flukes are called metacercariae. Development within the snail takes 40 to 69 days depending upon the temperature and the species of snail. The definitive host ingests vegetation containing the metacercariae. In the stomach and the intestine, the metacercariae are stimulated to emerge from the cyst (excystation). Newly excysted juvenile flukes penetrate the wall of the intestine and migrate in the abdominal cavity. Juvenile flukes penetrate the Glisson's capsule of the liver and continue migrating in the liver tissue. Rarely juvenile flukes penetrate other organs, such as lungs or kidneys. In these organs, however, flukes do not survive and not attain maturity. In the liver, flukes migrate within the parenchyma to search another fluke. If the fluke meet another one, they stop moving, and the fibrous capsule is formed around them. In the capsule, the parasite completes its development and starts egg-laying. Prepatent period varies 3–7 months and is dependent on host species. Adult F. magna can survive in the liver of the host up to 7 years.

== Distribution ==
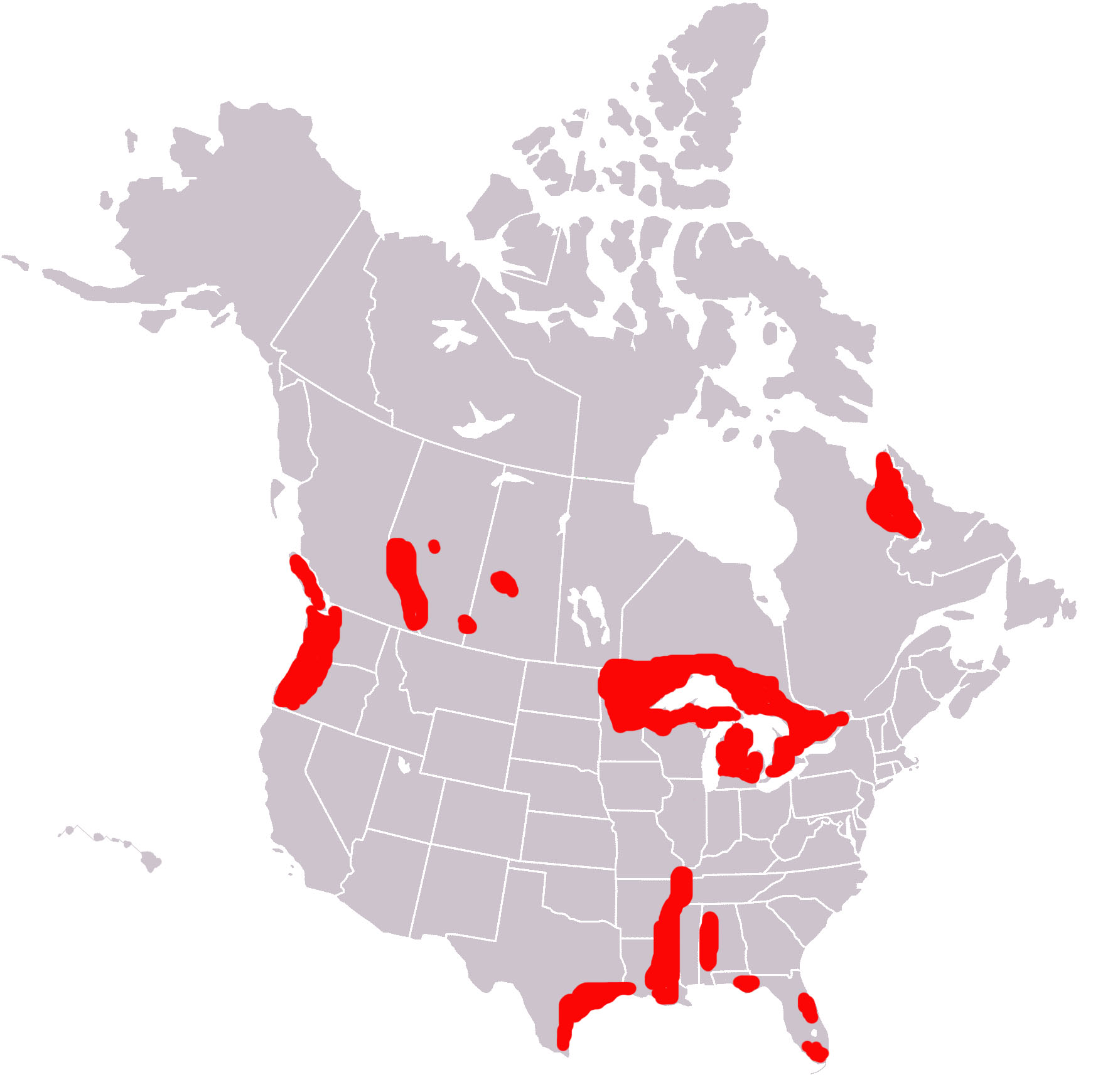
Distribution of F. magna in North America

Currently, F. magna occurs only in North America and Europe where suitable habitat exists and susceptible intermediate hosts are found. However, sporadic works reported unique appearance of the fluke in other continents. F. magna was found in imported animals in South Africa, Australia and Cuba. In all cases, infected animals (Brahman heifer, ox, and elk, respectively) were imported from the United States or Canada.

=== North America ===
During the 20th century, F. magna was reported in these American states: Arkansas, California, Colorado, Illinois, Iowa, Kansas, Louisiana, Michigan, Minnesota, Montana, New York, Oklahoma, Oregon, South Carolina, Texas, Washington, and Wisconsin. Areas of New England are not areas normally inhabited by F. magna, but the fluke has been reported in this region. In Canada, the fluke was reported in Alberta, British Columbia, Ontario, and Quebec. Currently, F. magna is enzootic in five major areas: (1) the Great Lakes region; (2) the Gulf coast, lower Mississippi, and southern Atlantic seaboard; (3) northern Pacific coast; (4) the Rocky Mountain trench; and (5) northern Quebec and Labrador. However, within these broad ranges, actual presence of giant liver flukes varies from locally abundant to locally absent.

=== Europe ===
Fascioloides magna was first reported by Bassi in Turin, Italy. In spite of Bassi's work, no other data concerning the occurrence of F. magna in Europe were reported until the 1930s. In the Czech territory, Ullrich reported the first appearance of F. magna in fallow deer as late as 1930. At the same time, Salomon (1932) diagnosed the fluke in one hunted red deer near Görlitz (Saxony) in Germany. Other isolated findings of the fluke were recorded in Italy and Poland. From 1948 to 1961, sporadic occurrence of the parasite in red deer (Cervus elaphus), fallow deer (Dama dama) and roe deer (Capreolus capreolus) were reported by several authors in former Czechoslovakia. However, all reports were published on the basis of incident discoveries in hunted deer and no massive infections were documented. In 1960s, a number of F. magna outbreaks in cervids were reported in some areas of former Czechoslovakia. The prevalence of infection varied from 70 to 80% in red deer and maximum parasite burden was 144 worms. In addition, sudden deaths were documented in free or game ranging deer. The highest mortality was reported in free ranging roe deer in Písek County in the South Bohemia of former Czechoslovakia. In the same region, moreover, the parasite was found in livers of slaughtered cattle.

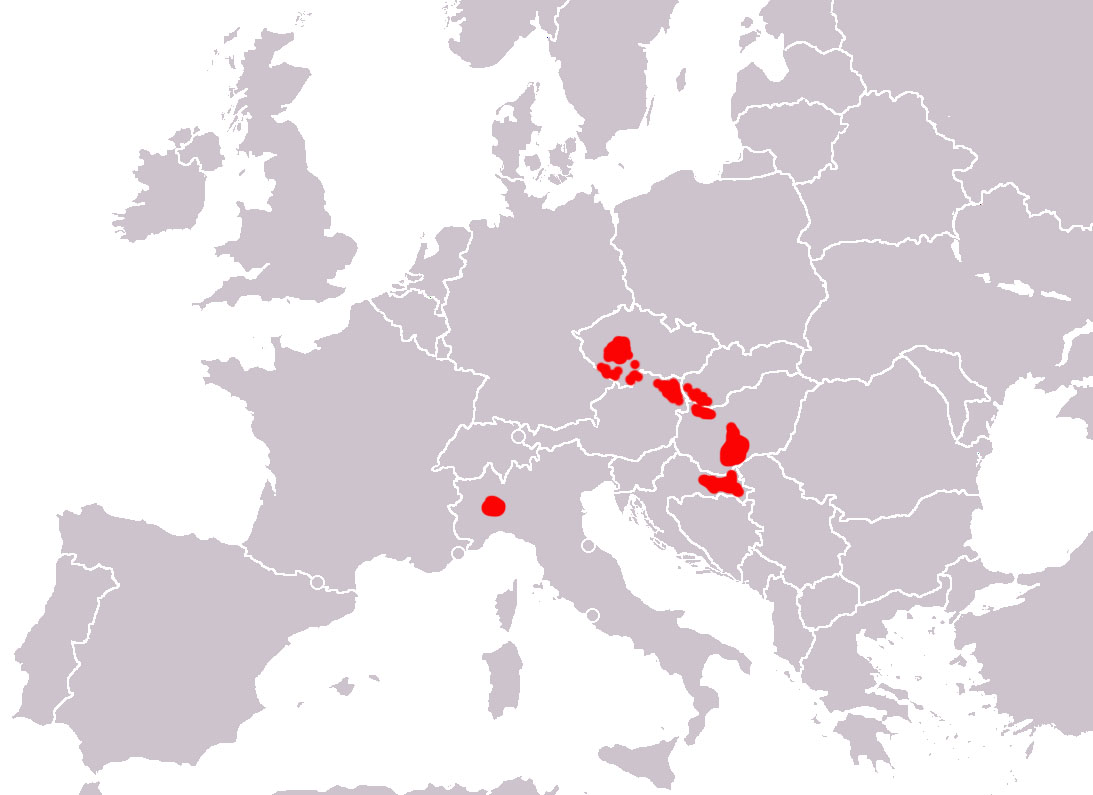
Distribution of F. magna in Europe

Erhardová-Kotrlá (1971) confirmed red deer, fallow deer and roe deer as main definitive hosts of F. magna in Europe. In the 1960s, F. magna was enzootic in former Czechoslovakia in following four major areas: (1) České Budějovice and Třeboň county, including Gratzen Mountains; (2) the area along the Vltava River on the Vltava-Týn hills near Hluboká nad Vltavou and Bechyně; (3) Písek and Milevsko county; (4) the Brdy mountains and the Hřebeny mountains. In following years, F. magna was only reported from these areas. Recently, geographical distribution of F. magna in cervids was determined in the Czech Republic. The giant liver fluke was confirmed in the same areas as reported in the 1960s. However, seven new endemic areas of F. magna were discovered suggesting that the parasite is spreading in the Czech Republic. Moreover, the appearance of F. magna in the Bohemian Forest mountains has epizootiological importance due to possibility of spread of the parasite into the German territory (Bavaria). During the last few years, a new European enzootic area has established in the Danube watershed in Central Europe. In 1988, F. magna was isolated from a 3-year old red deer female found dead near the Gabčíkovo water plant at the Danube River in Slovakia. The parasite has spread through whole Slovak Danube watershed. Soon after the Slovak first report, F. magna was found in red deer in Hungarian parts of Danubian floodplain forests. The prevalence reported by the same authors was up to 90%. F. magna infection of cervids is a considerable problem in northern part of Hungary (Szigetköz) and the southern Danubian territory in the Gemenc area. Since the autumn of 2000, F. magna has been found in Austrian territory, east of Vienna. In years 2000–2001, the prevalence of the giant liver fluke in red deer in Austrian parts of Danube (east of Vienna) was 66.7%. Appearance of American liver fluke was reported in Croatia in January 2000. The prevalence of fascioloidosis among red deer in Hungary was 21,1–60,7 % between 1998 and 2005. During the necropsy of 459 deer livers (using Egri's method) the number of flukes per host ranged from 1 to 138 in the same period. Regarding the origin of F. magna enzootic area in the Danube River watershed, it is essential to point out that cervids were not introduced into these localities, neither recently nor in the past. Origin of the F. magna population in Danubian floodplain forests in Central Europe remains therefore unclear.

== Definitive hosts ==
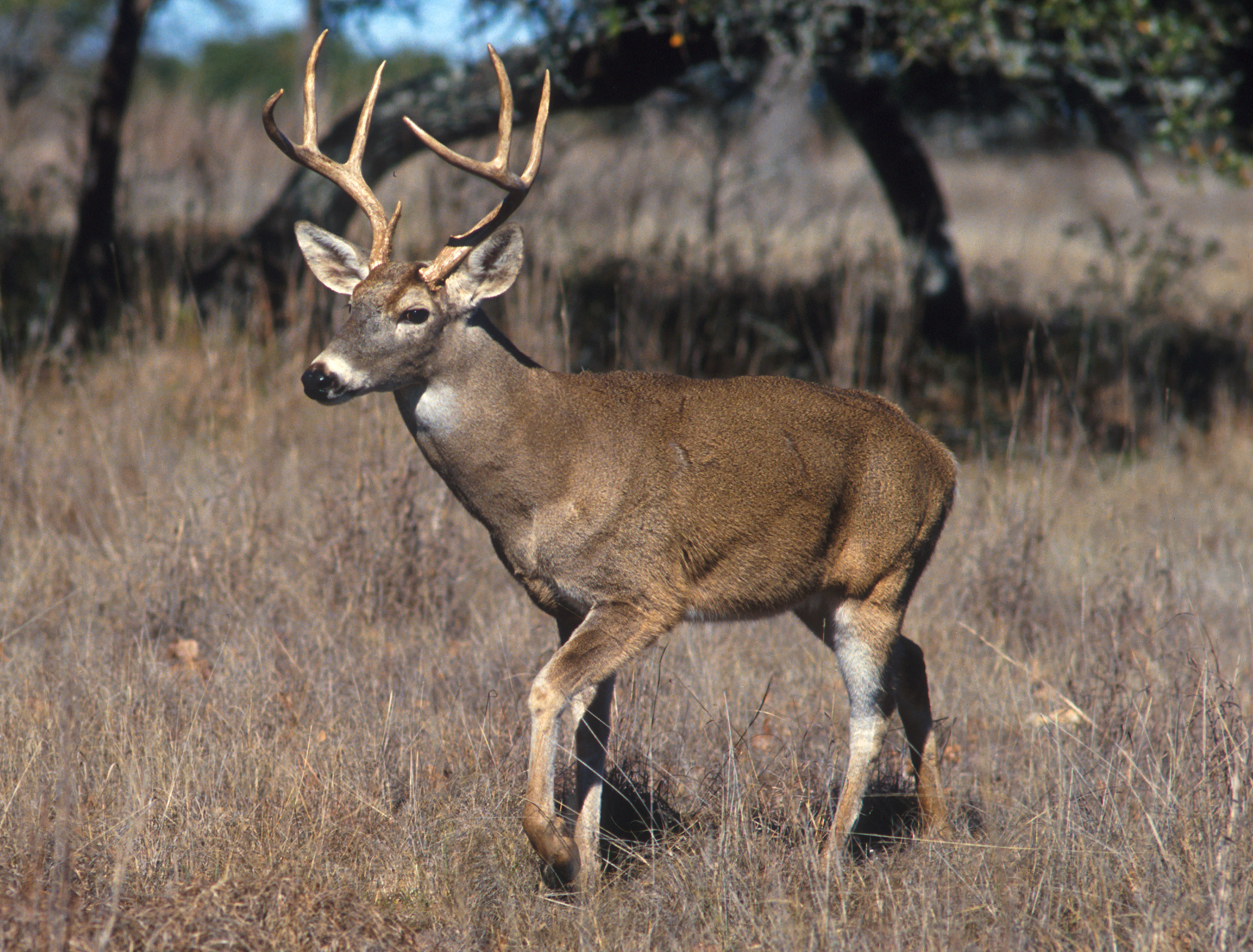
White-tailed deer – a typical definitive host of the giant liver fluke

Natural infections of F. magna occur primarily in cervids and bovids. Although many species are susceptible to infection, only a few cervid species contribute significantly to maintaining populations of the fluke. In North America, the common definitive hosts of the giant liver fluke are wapiti (Cervus elaphus canadensis), white-tailed deer (Odocoileus virginianus) and caribou (Rangifer tarandus). In Europe, F. magna occurs commonly in red deer (Cervus elaphus), fallow deer (Dama dama) and roe deer (Capreolus capreolus). Domestic ruminants are also susceptible to natural infection with F. magna. However, the infection is not patent, and domestic ruminants do not contribute to the propagation of the parasite in the environment. In North America, the giant liver fluke is commonly found in cattle, sheep and goats in areas where F. magna is enzootic in deer. In contrast, F. magna occurs rarely in domestic ruminants in Europe. The list of all natural definitive hosts of F. magna is presented in Table. Humans are not known to be a definitive host.

The only indigenous primary definitive host of F. magna is white-tailed deer. This species has been parasitized by the fluke for the longest time in historical context. Wapiti and caribou are of Eurasian origin and entered North America during the Pleistocene epoch, and overlapped with white-tailed deer in some parts of North America. They might have encountered F. magna in these shared biotopes.

Common name of species	Latin name of species	References
NORTH AMERICA		
Bison	Bison bison	
Black-tailed deer	Odocoileus hemionus columbianus	
Caribou	Rangifer tarandus	
Cattalo	Bos taurus × Bison bison	
Cattle	Bos taurus	
Collared peccary	Dicotyles tajacu	
Goat	Capra hircus	
Horse	Equus caballus	
Llama	Lama glama	
Moose	Alces alces	
Mule deer	Odocoileus hemionus hemionus	
Pig	Sus scrofa var. domesticus	
Sheep	Ovis aries	
Wapiti	Cervus elaphus canadensis	
White-tailed deer	Odocoileus virginianus	
Wild boar	Sus scrofa	
Yak	Bos grunniensis	
EUROPE		
Blue bull	Bosephalus tragocamelus	
Cattle	Bos taurus	
Fallow deer	Dama dama	
Goat	Capra hircus	
Horse	Equus caballus	
Red deer	Cervus elaphus	
Roe deer	Capreolus capreolus	
Sambar	Cervus unicolor	
Sheep	Ovis aries	
Sika deer	Sika nippon	
White-tailed deer	Odocoileus virginianus	
Wild boar	Sus scrofa	

=== (1) Definitive hosts ===
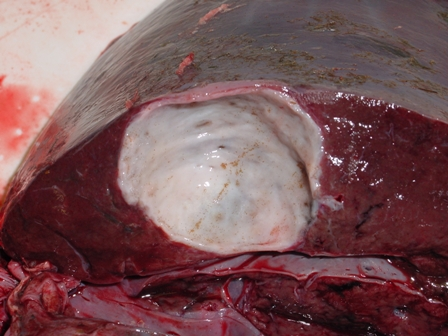
The fibrous capsule in the liver parenchyma of red deer infected with F. magna

Definitive hosts are primarily New World and some Old World cervids. In definitive hosts, flukes are encapsulated in thin-walled fibrous capsules communicating to the bile system. The eggs are passed through the bile system, enter the small intestine, and leave the host with faeces. Therefore, the infection is patent. The capsules are a result of the defence response of the host to the parasite and are pathognomonic for F. magna infection. They contain two to five flukes, greyish-black fluid with eggs and cell detritus.

F. magna infections in definitive hosts are usually subclinical. However, massive deaths caused by the fluke in red-, fallow- and roe deer were reported. Lethargy, depression, weight loss and decreased quality of antlers can occur sporadically. In addition, nervous symptoms were observed very rarely. In the first case, urging motion followed by apathy was reported in one experimentally infected fallow deer. Authors suggested that these symptoms were associated with hepatocerebral syndrome. Other author has observed partial paralysis in naturally infected wapiti caused by migrating juvenile flukes in the spinal cord. Biochemical and haematological profiles are little investigated in definitive hosts. A decrease of haemoglobin, elevation of γ-globulins, and increase of eosinophils in serum was observed in experimentally infected white-tailed deer.

=== (2) Dead-end hosts ===
Dead-end hosts are represented by large bovids, suids, llamas, horses and some Old World cervids. Infections in dead-end hosts are characterized by excessive fibrosis, thick-walled encapsulation of flukes within hepatic parenchyma, and black pigmentation of various tissues. Both afferent and efferent bile ducts are totally occluded and are marked by tracts of fibrous tissue. The eggs can not be passed into the bile system, and, therefore, the infection is not patent. In addition, flukes rarely mature in dead-end hosts probably due to strong immune response. Nevertheless, appearance of F. magna eggs in the faeces of a single experimentally infected calf has been documented. Rarely have the pathophysiology or clinical symptoms in dead-end hosts have been studied. In cattle, significant elevations of eosinophil counts in periphery blood but only slight increases of AST and GGT have been observed. While American authors have not observed any clinical symptoms in cattle, anorexia and weight loss were recorded in naturally infected bulls in the former Czechoslovakia.

=== (3) Aberrant hosts ===
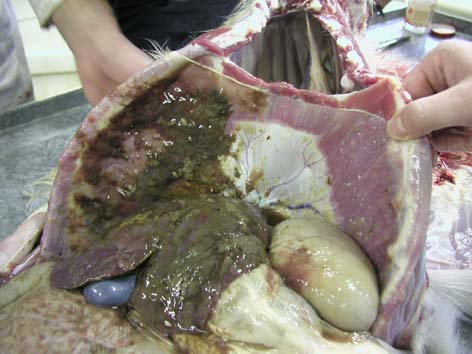
Necropsy of goat infected with F. magna: fibrin between liver and diaphragm

Aberrant hosts of F. magna are sheep and goats. However, the course of infection is similar in guinea pigs, rabbits, bighorn sheep (Ovis canadensis) and chamois (Rupicapra rupicapra) that were infected experimentally. Infections in aberrant hosts are characterized by excessive wandering of juvenile flukes and death of the host. Aberrant hosts die usually within 6 months post-infection and the death is associated with acute peritonitis or extensive haemorrhage caused by migrating flukes. In aberrant hosts, flukes do not mature and migrate until the host dies. Occasionally, a few flukes mature and eggs can be found in the faeces. Hepatic lesions in aberrant hosts generally include firm adhesions of the liver to the diaphragm, black pigmentation, hematomas, necroses, and haemorrhagic tracts in which juvenile flukes are located. While a lack of fibrous capsules within hepatic parenchyma has been reported by several authors, flukes in fibrous capsules have also been documented in sheep. However, the wall of the capsule is different from those found in cervids and large bovids. The dominant feature is a diffuse fibrosis throughout the liver and haemorrhagic migratory tracts containing erythrocytes, black pigment, and cell detritus. The liver lesions are infiltrated by eosinophils, plasma cells, and pigment-laden macrophages.

Sheep and goats die acutely without any previous clinical signs. Only elevation of eosinophils and slight increase of γ-globulins were observed in experimentally infected sheep. Recently, several changes in biochemical and haematological profile have been documented in experimentally infected goats. The significant increase of GLDH (glutamate dehydrogenase) was recorded from 14 weeks after infection in goats experimentally infected with F. magna.

== Intermediate hosts ==
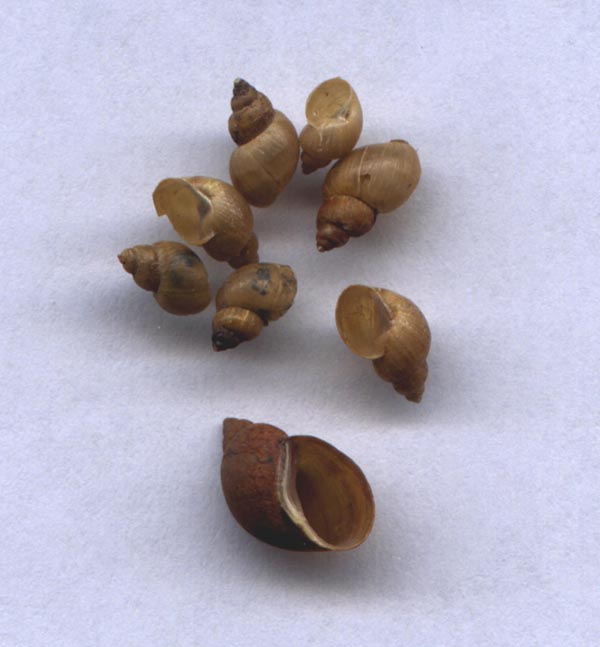
Intermediate hosts of F. magna in Europe: freshwater snails, G. truncatula (above) and R. peregra (below).

Since the presence of an intermediate host is essential to the completion of the life cycle, snails occupy the important role in the epidemiology of F. magna. The intermediate hosts of the giant liver fluke belong to the family Lymnaeidae. In North America, a total of 10 lymnaeid snails were reported as intermediate hosts of F. magna. 6 of 10 North American snail species were found naturally infected and the other four were infected only under experimental conditions. In addition, the Australian species Austropeplea (Lymnaea) tomentosa was exposed to the North American isolate of F. magna and the parasite was able to complete its development. The most common North American natural snail hosts of the fluke are Fossaria (Galba) modicella, Stagnicola (Lymnaea) caperata and Fossaria (Galba) bulimoides techella. In Europe, an intermediate host had not been known until 1960's. At the beginning, Ślusarski assumed that Lymnaea stagnalis could act as an intermediate host of F. magna in Europe. His assumption, however, has been neither confirmed by positive findings in the field nor by experimental infection. In 1961, Dr. Erhardová described the life cycle of F. magna based on observations of experimentally and naturally infected snails. She confirmed that Galba truncatula is an intermediate host of the giant liver fluke in Europe. In later works, the author studied another lymnaeid species in the former Czechoslovakia. However, G. truncatula was repeatedly confirmed as the only snail host of F. magna. In 1979, Chroustová reported successful experimental infection of Stagnicola (Lymnaea) palustris with F. magna. She considered that this species might serve as an intermediate host of the fluke in the environment. Nevertheless, no naturally infected snails were found. Recent studies indicate that another lymnaeid snail, Radix peregra, may be also involved in the transmission of F. magna in Europe. This opinion is supported by successful experimental infection of R. peregra in the lab as well as by findings of naturally infected R. peregra in the environment These findings suggested that the intermediate host spectrum of F. magna should be, similarly to North America, diverse in Europe. The list of intermediate hosts of F. magna is presented in following table.

Snail species	Naturally infected	Experimentally infected	Country	Reference
NORTH AMERICA				
Fossaria (Galba) bulimoides techella	yes	yes	United States	
Fossaria (Galba) modicella	yes	yes	United States, Canada	
Pseudosuccinea columella	yes	yes	United States	
Fossaria (Galba) parva	yes	yes	Canada	
Stagnicola palustris nuttalliana	yes	yes	Canada	
Lymnaea stagnalis	no	yes	United States	
Stagnicola palustris	no	yes	United States	
Stagnicola (Lymnaea) caperata	yes	yes	United States	
Lymnaea ferruginea	no	yes	United States	
Austropeplea (Lymnaea) tomentosa	no	yes	Australia*	
Lymnaea umbrosa	no	yes	United States	
EUROPE				
Galba truncatula	yes	yes	Czech Republic	
Stagnicola (Lymnaea) palustris	no	yes	Czech Republic	
Omphiscola glabra	no	yes	France**	
Radix peregra	yes	yes	Czech Republic	

(*) Snails originated from Australia infected with United States isolate of F. magna
(**) Snails originated from France infected with Czech isolate of F. magna

== Clinical signs, pathology and pathophysiology ==
According to several American authors, three types of definitive host exist:

- (1) definitive hosts
- (2) dead-end hosts
- (3) aberrant hosts

Pathology of F. magna infection varies according to host type but some features are shared by all three types. Primary lesions usually occur in the liver and are associated with mechanical damage due to migrating juvenile flukes or fibrous encapsulation of sedentary adult flukes. The most common feature of F. magna infection is black pigmentation in abdominal or thoracic organs, especially in the liver. The hematin pigment is produced by flukes as a byproduct of feeding on blood. Pigment within tissues is a result of migrating of juvenile flukes and it accumulates within hepatic cells without resorption. F. magna has also been associated with Red Water disease in bovine. F. magna causes liver damage, which allows the bacteria Clostridium haemolyticum to cause secondary infection in hepatic tissue. The infection will decrease the livers function, and the host's urine will become red, hence the name "Red Water" disease.

== Diagnosis ==
While the eggs of F. magna resemble those of F. hepatica, this similarity is of limited use; eggs usually are not passed in cattle and sheep. Recovery of the parasites at necropsy, as well as proper identification of F. hepatica or F. gigantica is necessary for definite diagnosis. When domestic ruminants and deer share the same grazing areas, the presence of disease due to F. magna should be kept in mind. Mixed infections with F. hepatica occur in cattle.

== Control of F. magna and prevention ==
Formula of triclabendazole

For control of fascioloidosis in wild ruminants, successful application of anthelminthics in feed is necessary. The drug has to have flavour and smell that do not prevent animals from eating medicated feed. In addition, there should adequate therapeutic scope, i.e. span between therapeutic and minimal toxic dose. Therefore, only some of anthelminthics that are efficient in domestic ruminants have been tested in wild ruminants infected with F. magna. Several drugs, namely oxyclozanide, rafoxanide, albendazole, diamphenetide, closantel, clorsulon, and triclabendazole, have been used in control of F. magna infection in cervids. However, the results have differed between different authors. In the same way as for F. hepatica, triclabendazole seems to be the most effective against F. magna. Fascioloidosis of cervids was successfully controlled with triclabendazole in the United States, and triclabendazole with levamizole in Hungary, Canada, Austria, and Croatia. In contrast, rafoxanide is commonly used in treatment in Czech Republic Slovakia and Hungary. Nevertheless, recent studies suggested that use of rafoxanide in control of F. magna infection should be considered. Unfortunately, rafoxanide in a commercial drug called Rafendazol Premix is the only registered drug for wild ruminants. Triclabendazole and others are produced as drugs for domestic animals and it can be used in free-living animals only with special permit. In some cases, it may be difficult to determine if F. magna or a different fluke such as Fasciola hepatica or Fasciola gigantica is causing pathology since all these flukes will have the same clinical signs. In the case that the identity of the trematode cannot be determined, the drug triclabendazole can be used since this will deal with all three parasites.

== As human food ==
In North America, especially in Wisconsin, flukes found inside deer livers are sometimes consumed by humans, sautéed in butter. They are served as "liver butterflies", "little livers" or "little flapjacks".

== See also ==
- Fascioliasis
- Fasciola hepatica
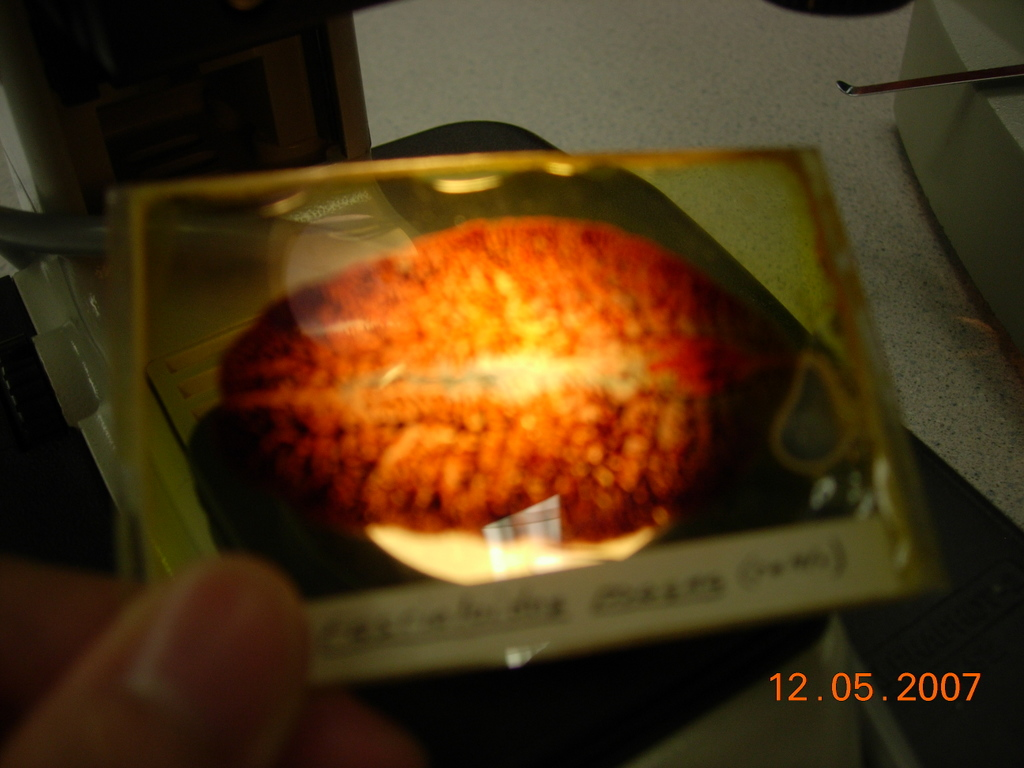
Relative size of F. magnus to human hand.
