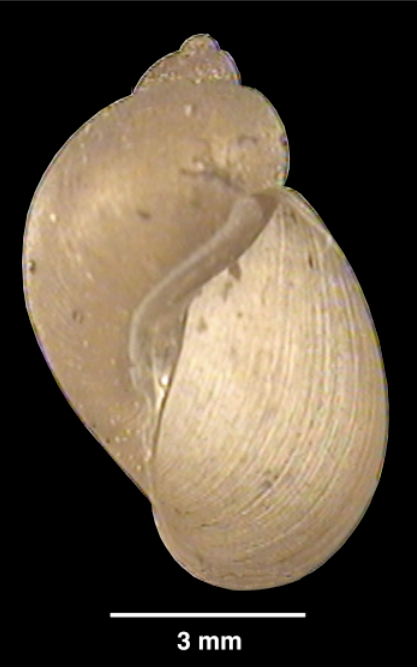
- Apertural view of a shell of Galba meridensis

Scientific classification
- Kingdom: Animalia
- Phylum: Mollusca
- Class: Gastropoda
- Superorder: Hygrophila
- Family: Lymnaeidae
- Genus: Galba
- Species: G. meridensis

Binomial name
- Galba meridensis (Bargues, Artigas & Mas-Coma, 2011)

= Galba meridensis =

Species of gastropod

Galba meridensis is a species of air-breathing freshwater snail, an aquatic pulmonate gastropod mollusc in the family Lymnaeidae, the pond snails.

This species appears to be endemic to very high altitudes.

This species belong to the Galba/Fossaria group, therefore this species should be named Galba meridensis. cf.

== Distribution ==
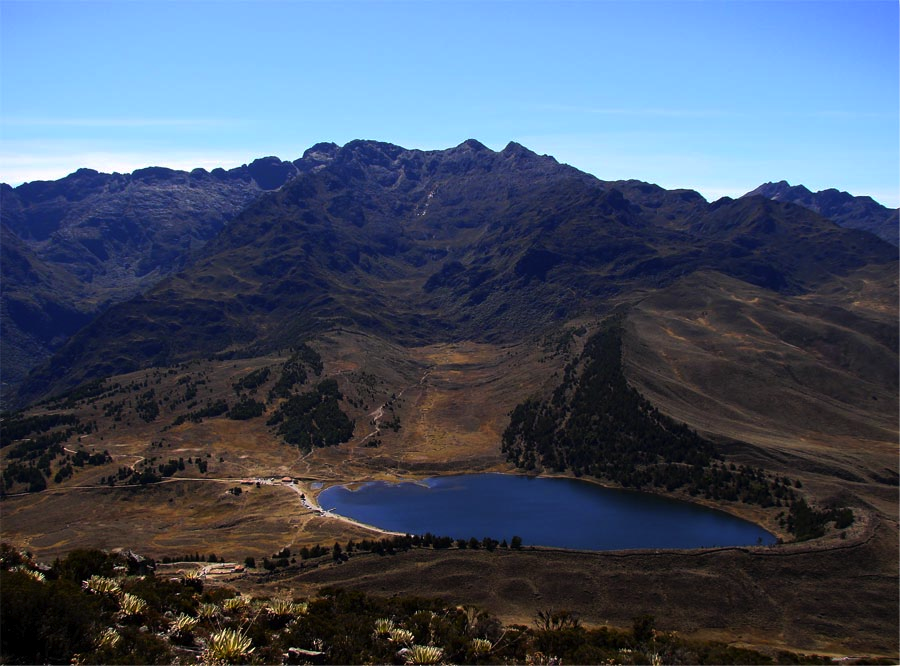
Kettle Mucubají is the type locality.

According to the 2011 knowledge of the distribution of this species, and in contrast to the widespread species Galba cousini, Lymnaea meridensis appears to be a geographically restricted species. This seems to suggest that Lymnaea meridensis evolved in a somewhat isolated fashion, in permanent ponds and small ditches in more northern, very high altitude areas (3,550-4,040 m) of the Andean mountains, like those in Merida State, Venezuela.

The type locality of Lymnaea meridensis is a permanent pond in Mucubaji (Kettle Mucubají), Merida State, Venezuela, located at an altitude of 3,550 m (8°47'51.8" N, 70°49'32.4" W).

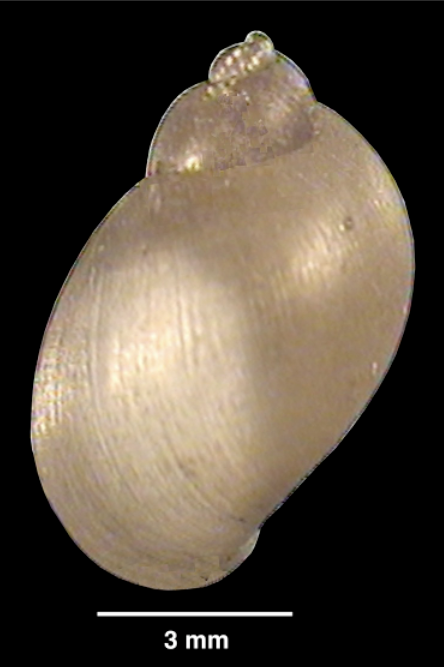
Photo of an abapertural view of a shell of Lymnaea meridensis.

== Description ==
The shell is light brown, thin-walled, with a relatively short spire. The apex is obtuse. The shell has fine growth lines, and has only 3 whorls. The body whorl dominates the shell, is inflated and separated by a deep, well-marked suture. The aperture is large, oblique, oval and wide at the base. The shell tends to be one and a half times as long as it is wide, and its aperture tends to be two thirds as long as the shell or more than twice as long as the spire.

The width of the shell is 3.7-6.0 mm. The height of the shell is 6.6-9.3 mm. The width of the aperture is 2.5-3.9 mm. The height of the aperture is 4.8-6.0 mm.

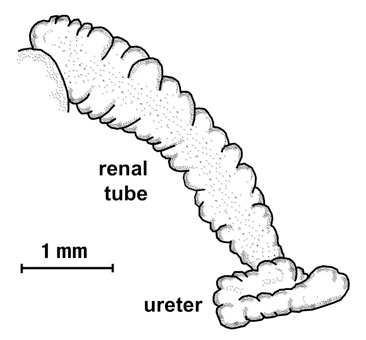
Excretory system: renal tube and ureter

Excretory system: The renal tube extends straightly from the pericardial region toward the mantle collar, diagonally across the roof of the pallial cavity. In its distal part, behind the osphradium, it shows two distinct flexures, coming back upon itself and, after a short course, bending sharply cephalad and rightward forming a ureter which tapers to a subterminal meatus behind the pneumostome.

Reproductive system: The ovotestis appears composed by pressed acini around a collecting canal which continues into an ovispermiduct presenting a very short smooth-walled proximal segment followed by a bosselated swelling seminal vesicle and finally a relatively short distal segment which ends in the carrefour. The albumen gland covers the carrefour and the origin of a bosselated, transverse tubular oviduct which follows a somewhat convolute course continuing into a striated nidamental gland. The nidamental gland narrows into a smooth-walled uterus, which bends and continues into a short bulbous vagina showing a sphincter-like thickening. The spherical spermatheca gives rise to a uniformly thin spermathecal duct which extends diagonally between the nidamental gland and the prostate until joining the vagina.

The distal portion of the spermiduct and the proximal portion of the prostate run on the ventral surface of the nidamental gland. The spermiduct, of granular outer surface, emerges from the carrefour, runs distalward and finally narrows to merge into a similarly granular prostate. The prostate increases in width to its distal end, shows ventrally a lengthwise fissure, formed by the folding of its left margin, and finally two rounded protuberances, from whose convergence the vas deferens arises. The vas deferens appears as a long, more or less uniformly thin duct which merges into a penis which is included within the penial sheath. The penis sheath is regularly cylindrical, with a somewhat thicker proximal part. The penis sheath is a little longer than the prepuce (ratio range of 0.93-1.38; mean 1.18 ± 0.18). The prepuce is thicker, around twice as wide as the penis sheath at the point of insertion of the penial sheath and gradually narrowing to terminate in the male genital pore.

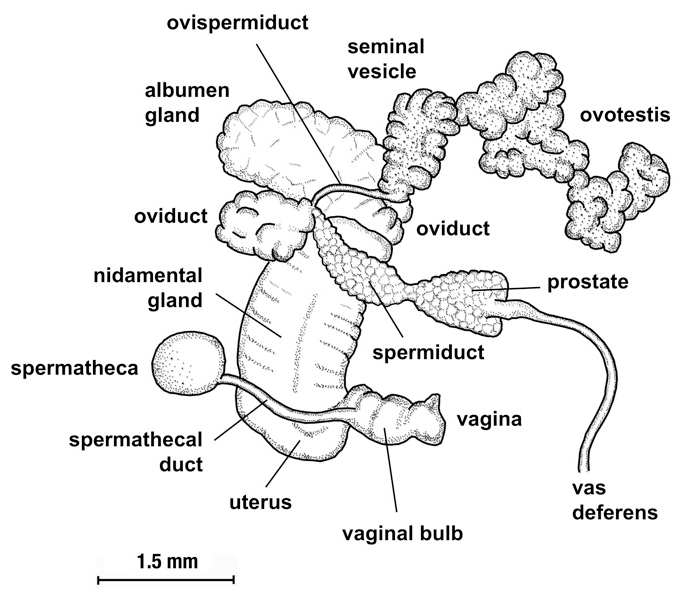
Reproductive system of Galba meridensis

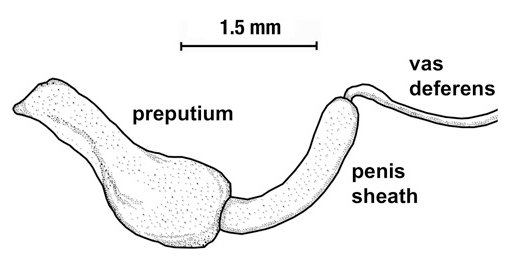
Other parts of the reproductive system.

== Ecology ==
Galba meridensis is probably susceptible to Fasciola hepatica infection.

== See also ==
Two species that have similar shell morphology:

- Galba cousini
- Pseudosuccinea columella
