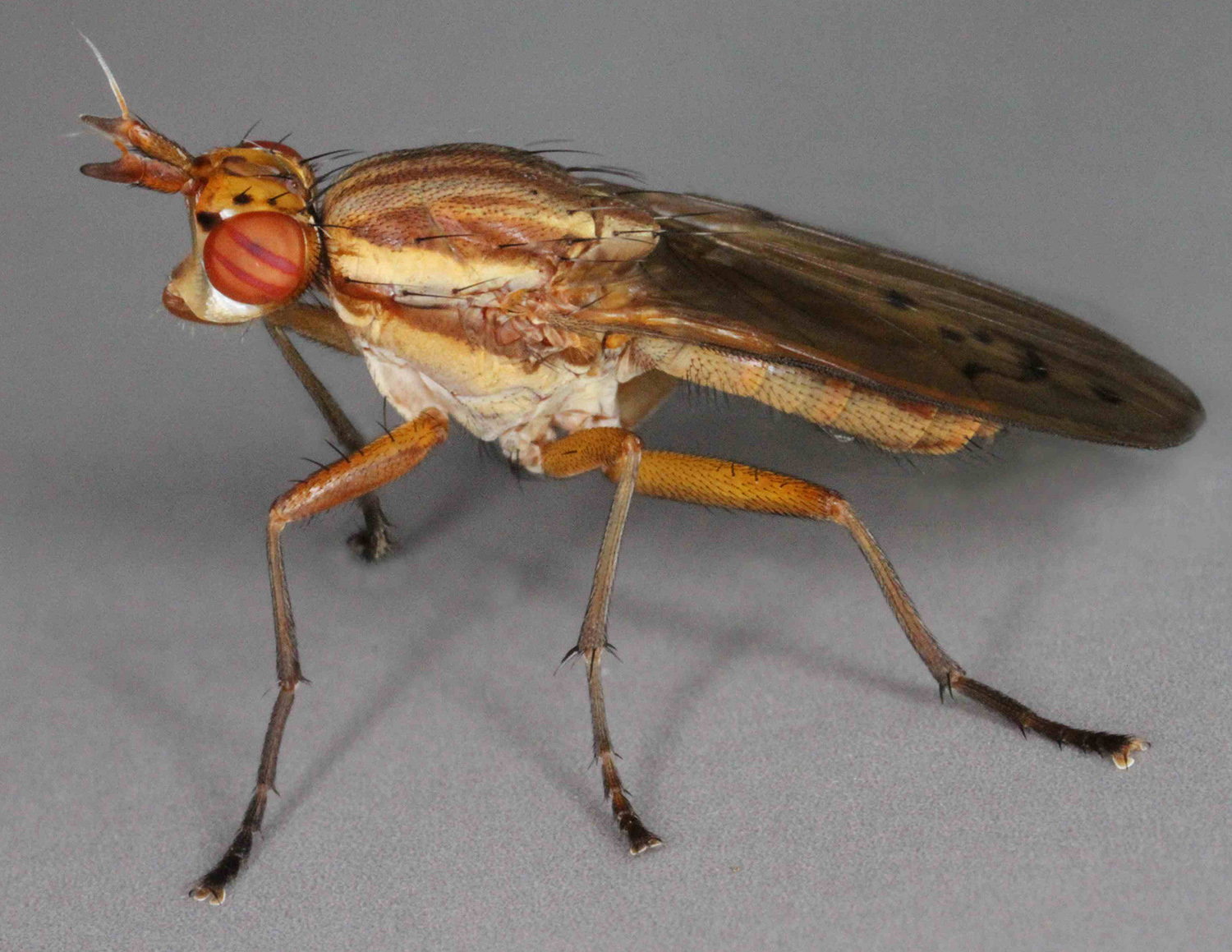
- Ilione albiseta North Wales

Scientific classification
- Kingdom: Animalia
- Phylum: Arthropoda
- Class: Insecta
- Order: Diptera
- Family: Sciomyzidae
- Genus: Ilione
- Species: I. albiseta

Binomial name
- Ilione albiseta (Scopoli, 1763)

Synonyms
- Musca albiseta Scopoli, 1763; Musca aratoria Fabricius, 1794; Musca crocus Harris, 1780; Tetanocera ustulata Stephens, 1829

= Ilione albiseta =

Species of fly

Ilione albiseta is a species of fly in the family Sciomyzidae. It is found in the Palearctic. The body length is 8 to 11.2mm and the basic colour is yellowish-brown. The spot on the occiput, the spots at the base of the frontal orbital setae and the almost triangular spots at the edge of the eyes at the height of the antennae are silky dark brown. The long antennae have a whitish hairy arists. There are longitudinal, brown stripes on the yellowish-dustedmesonotum : two narrow in the middle and two wide on the sides. In addition, there is a brown band on the body below the notopleura. The prosternum is bare. Chaetotaxy of the thorax shows strong presutural acrostichal setae and 2–3 well-developed subalar setae. The wings are 6.8 to 8 mm long and usually have 5 marks: on the anterior transverse vein, the medial vein, and the two ends of the posterior transverse vein. If there are only 2 dots on the medial vein, the transverse veins are at least darkened. The legs are yellow with darkened tarsi. The lower surfaces of the femora of the hind legs are equipped with strong and dense setae in males, and with short and sparse setae in females. Males are characterized by a copulatory apparatus with non-swollen abdominal pituitary glands.For terms see Morphology of Diptera. The larva preys on Galba truncatula
