= Galba neotropica =

Scientific classification
- Kingdom: Animalia
- Phylum: Mollusca
- Class: Gastropoda
- Superorder: Hygrophila
- Family: Lymnaeidae
- Genus: Galba
- Species: G. neotropica

Binomial name
- Galba neotropica (Bargues, Artigas, Mera y Sierra, Pointier & Mas-Coma, 2007)

Synonyms
- Lymnaea neotropica Bargues, Artigas, Mera y Sierra, Pointier & Mas-Coma, 2007; Lymnaea viatrix elongata Lymnaea viatrix var. B elongata d'Orbigny, 1835; Lymnaea viatrix var. elongata

Species of gastropod

Galba neotropica is a species of air-breathing freshwater snail, an aquatic pulmonate gastropod mollusk in the family Lymnaeidae, the pond snails.

This species was described as Lymnaea neotropica in 2007. However, it belongs to the Galba genus, therefore this species is named Galba neotropica. cf.

Galba neotropica is the vector typically responsible for fascioliasis (liver fluke) livestock infection.

== Distribution ==
Galba neotropica was originally described from Lima, Peru and surroundings; it appears to be a species restricted to South America, but with a very broad geographical distribution from Argentina in the Southern Cone north to Venezuela.

The distribution of this species includes:

- Peru
- Argentina
- Venezuela

== Description ==
The maximum length of the shell of this species is 10.36 mm. Whorls are convex. The columella is slightly curved and unfolded.

An examination of tentacles, eyes and colour in living specimens has never been performed.

In the radula, the first bilateral teeth are bicuspid but occasionally they are tricuspid or rarely quadricuspid. The praeputium/penis sheath length ratio is 1.10–3.90 mm (mean 2.12–2.70 mm).

Two species that have a similar morphology are Galba truncatula and Galba schirazensis. Although several phenotypic characteristics are somewhat helpful for a preliminary specimen classification, a definitive classification of a specimen can only be obtained by the sequencing of at least one of the molecular markers used: ITS-2, ITS-1, 16S and cox1.

== Ecology ==
Galba neotropica is sometimes amphibious. The habitat of Galba neotropica rarely also includes artificial water bodies.

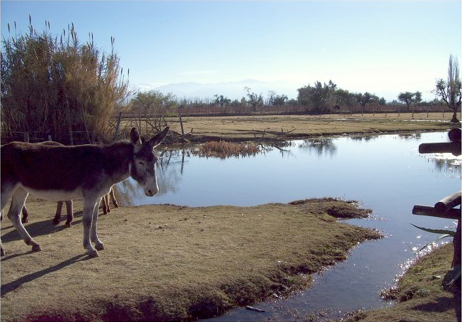
An artificial pond in Mendoza Province, Argentina

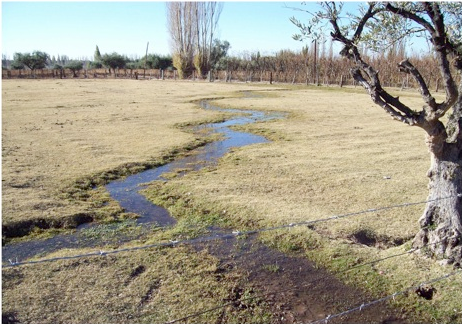
An artificial irrigation channel, Mendoza Province, Argentina

These snails hatch from eggs. The shape of the egg cluster is rounded to an oval when containing few eggs; when the clutch includes more eggs, it lengthens with a slight curving trend. There are about 4–16 eggs in each cluster.

Parasites of Galba neotropica include:

- Fasciola hepatica. The transmission capacity of Fasciola hepatica to humans is low, however, the transmission capacity of Fasciola hepatica to animals is high.
