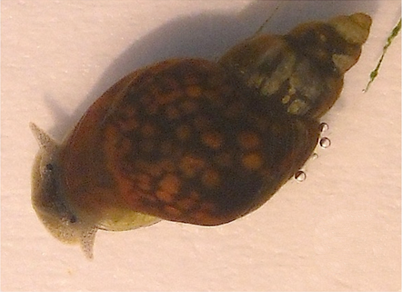
- top view

Conservation status
- Least Concern (IUCN 3.1)

Scientific classification
- Kingdom: Animalia
- Phylum: Mollusca
- Class: Gastropoda
- Superorder: Hygrophila
- Family: Lymnaeidae
- Genus: Galba
- Species: G. schirazensis

Binomial name
- Galba schirazensis (Küster, 1862)

Synonyms
- Limnaeus schirazensis Küster, 1862; Lymnaea schirazensis (Küster, 1862); Lymnaeus schirazensis Küster, 1862

= Galba schirazensis =

Species of gastropod

Galba schirazensis is a species of air-breathing freshwater snail, an aquatic pulmonate gastropod mollusk in the family Lymnaeidae, the pond snails.

== Taxonomy ==
This species was originally described by German malacologist Heinrich Carl Küster. Although text description was in 1863 and figure description in 1862, the year 1862 prevails (according to the article 12.2.7 of the International Code of Zoological Nomenclature) because the name was already correctly cited in the figure legends of the 1862 plate.

The specific name schirazensis is based on the name of the Iranian city Shiraz, which is the type locality for this species.

Morphological, anatomical and phylogenetic analyses confirmed that this species belong to the Galba/Fossaria group. According to the same study, Galba schirazensis was previously an overlooked cryptic species, which had generally been confused with the very similar species Galba truncatula.

== Distribution ==
According to the IUCN Red List, the native distribution of Galba schirazensis includes: Afghanistan, Armenia, Azerbaijan, Georgia, Iran and Russian Federation.

The distribution of this species includes:

- Fars province and Gilan province in Iran
- Spain,
- Egypt
- Portugal

Galba schirazensis was introduced to Central and South America from the Old World:

- Central America: Mexico, the Dominican Republic
- Venezuela
- Ecuador
- Peru: Cajamarca Region, Lima Region

The type locality is Shiraz, Iran.

== Description ==
Drawings of the shell of Galba schirazensis from its original description by Heinrich Carl Küster:

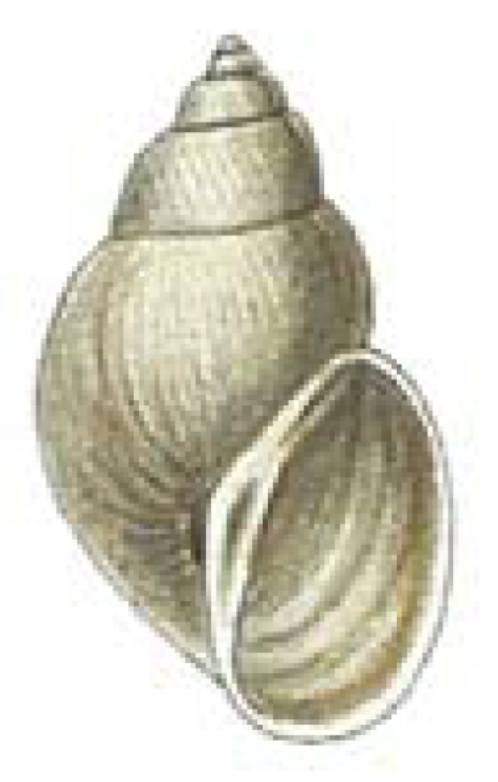
apertural view

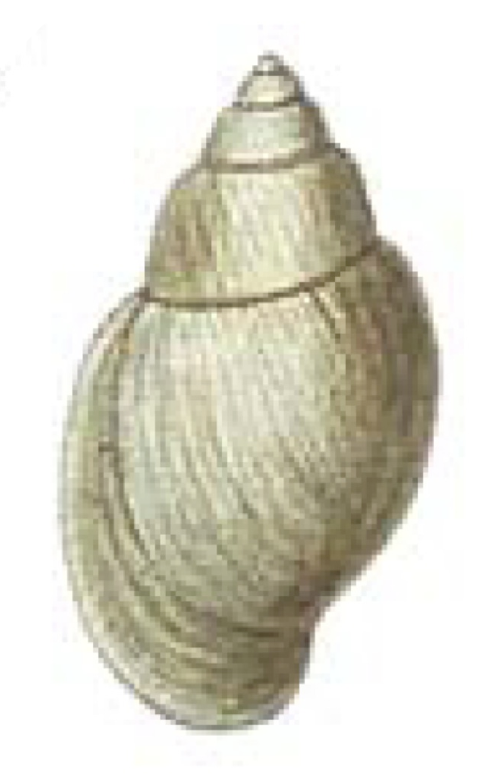
abapertural view

The shell is brownish to reddish light brown, thin-walled, elongated conical, usually with four regular convex whorls and up to 5.5 whorls in the longer specimens. The whorls are somewhat inflated, slightly shouldered, with silky and longitudinally striated surface and separated by a deep, well-marked suture, increasing rather slowly in diameter. The columella is straight, unfolded, and the umbilicus is open. The last or body whorl is almost ¾ times as high as the shell height, presenting a slight twisting trend along its basal part visible in the biggest shells when viewed dorsally, and which is due to the enlargement of the basal lip of the peristome (in the way of Pseudosuccinea columella). The spire is pointed. The aperture is elongatedly oval, slightly oblique, mid-sized and wider at the base. The thin peristome is patent throughout, the umbilicus is partially covered by a widened columellar lip. The shell shows a tendency to be approximately one and a half to two times as long as it is wide, and its aperture tends to be slightly less than half as long as the shell. The width of the shell is 1.39–4.31 mm. The height of the shell is 2.41–8.06 mm. The width of the aperture is 0.77–2.66 mm. The height of the aperture is 1.16–4.12 mm.

The following three characteristics of shell may be useful in species identification: The maximum height of the shell is 8.06 mm. Whorls are regularly convex. The columella is straight.

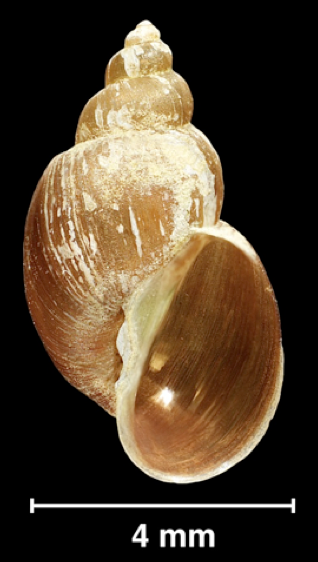
apertural view

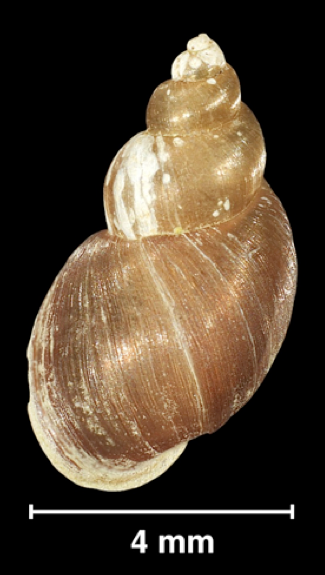
abapertural view

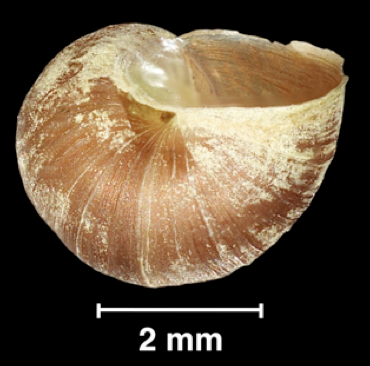
umbilical view

The cephalopedeal mass is pale greyish. The eyes are black and relatively big in size. Tentacles are elongate, slender, pyramidal, with a narrow base. The mantle roof is dark, from dark brown to blackish throughout, with small unpigmented white-greyish round spots including several tiny circles at the beginning of the border of the pulmonary region and a few scattered further away in between the initial large round spots. The border of the mantle is light grey. The black pigmentation of the hypopeplear region of the mantle roof gave a dark appearance to the shell of living specimens by transparency. This dark appearance did not depend on the characteristics of the natural habitat, as it was maintained across the different laboratory-reared snail generations (quite the opposite of what happens with several darkish populations of other lymnaeid species under experimental conditions).

The following external characteristics of shell may be useful in species identification: Tentacles are elongate, slender and with a narrow base. Eyes are big. the color of mantle roof varies from dark brown to blackish throughout, with unpigmented white-greyish round spots, giving a dark appearance to the shell by transparency.

The following internal characteristics of shell may be useful in species identification: The first bilateral teeth are mostly bicuspid in radula. The praeputium/penis sheath length ratio is 1.20–2.23 mm (mean 1.60 mm).

Two species that have a similar morphology: Galba truncatula and Galba neotropica. Galba schirazensis is genetically distant but phenotypically very close to Galba truncatula and it has always been confused with Galba truncatula. Although several phenotypic characteristics may a priori be helpful for a preliminary specimen classification, a definitive classification of a specimen can only be obtained by the sequencing of at least one of the molecular markers used: ribosomal DNA markers ITS-2 and ITS-1; mitochondrial DNA markers: 16S and cox1.

== Ecology and transmission of diseases ==
Galba schirazensis is often amphibious and there is a terrestrial trend. They are sometimes anthropophilous. Mixed populations of Galba truncatula and Galba schirazensis have already been described in the field. Self-fertilization has been verified to be the normal fertilisation process in Galba schirazensis. They are hatching from eggs. The shape of egg cluster is kidney- to banana-like, the more curved, elongated and narrow the more numerous are the eggs inside. There are around 6–14 eggs in cluster.

Researchers believed that, unlike the similar species Galba truncatula, Galba schirazensis did not transfer Fasciola hepatica (i.e. was not able to transmit fascioliasis). However, results published in 2017 found that Galba schirazensis was harbouring rediae of Fasciola hepatica in Ecuador and could be an intermediate host.

== Human use ==
This species has been distorting results of fasciolid specificity/susceptibility analyses as well as the geographical distribution of the disease. Galba schirazensis can be used as a useful biomarker of foreign livestock introduction. Galba schirazensis offers a laboratory model for studies on genomics and proteomics about susceptibility/resistance in Fasciola hepatica/lymnaeid interaction.
