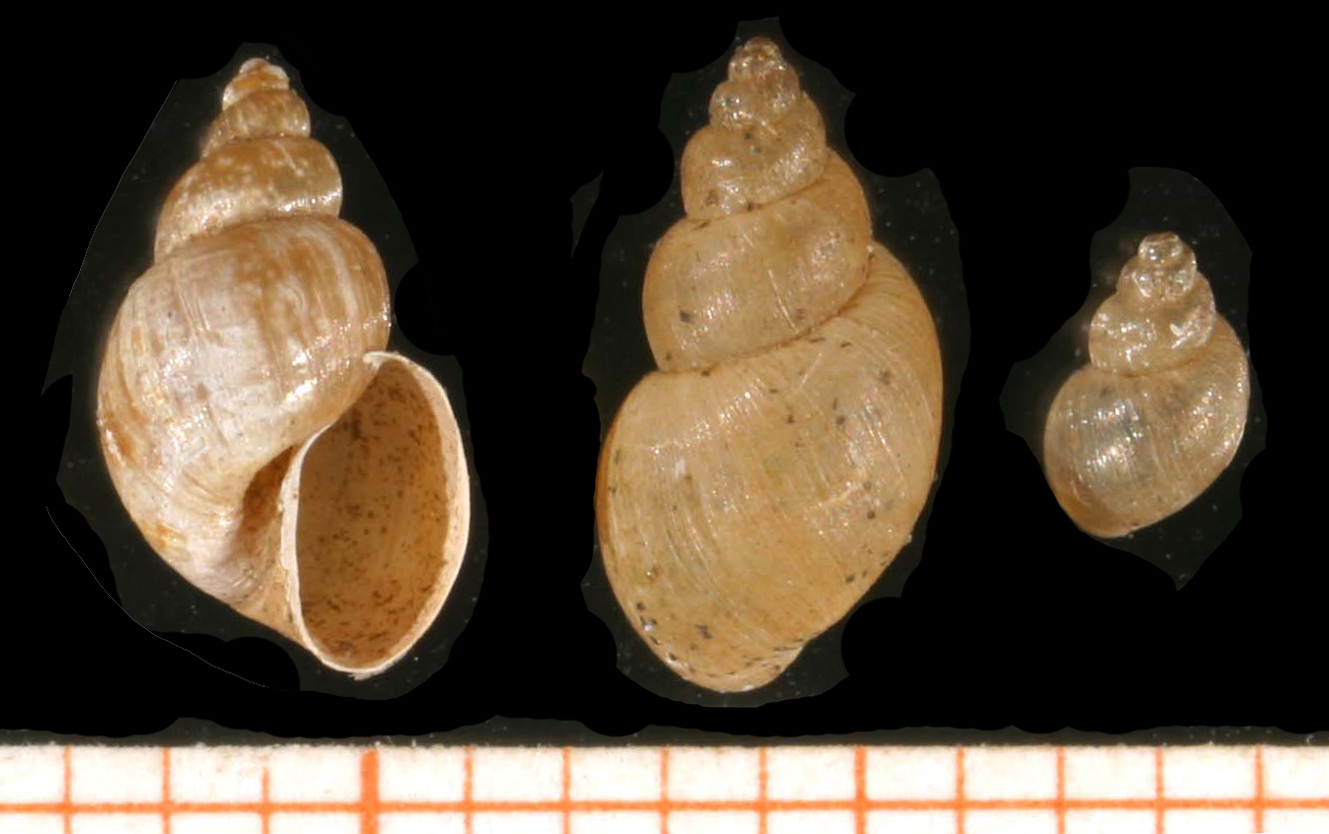
- Shells of Galba truncatula

Scientific classification
- Kingdom: Animalia
- Phylum: Mollusca
- Class: Gastropoda
- Superorder: Hygrophila
- Superfamily: Lymnaeoidea
- Family: Lymnaeidae
- Genus: Galba; Schrank, 1803

Type species
- Buccinum truncatulum O. F. Müller, 1774

Synonyms
- Fossaria Westerlund, 1885; Fossaria (Bakerilymnaea) Weyrauch, 1964; Galba (Bakerilymnaea) Weyrauch, 1964; Galba (Galba) Schrank, 1803; Galba (Pseudogalba) F. C. Baker, 1913· accepted, alternate representation; Galba (Sibirigalba) Kruglov & Starobogatov, 1985; Galba (Simpsonia) F.C. Baker, 1911 (Invalid: junior homonym of Simpsonia Rochebrune, 1905 [Bivalvia]); Limnaea (Fossaria) Westerlund, 1885 (a junior synonym); Limnaea (Galba) Schrank, 1803 (genus misspelling; Galba is a separate genus); Limnaea (Truncatuliana) Servain, 1882 (invalid: junior objective synonym of Galba); † Limneus (Entochilius) F. Sandberger, 1880 (junior synonym); Lymnaea (Galba) Schrank, 1803 (elevated to genus level); Nasonia F. C. Baker, 1928 (invalid: junior homonym of Nasonia Ashmead, 1904 [Hymenoptera]; Bakerilymnaea is a replacement name); Sphaerogalba Kruglov & Starobogatov, 1985 (a junior synonym); Truncatuliana Servain, 1881 (invalid: junior objective synonym of Galba)

= Galba (gastropod) =

Galba Temporal range: Jurassic–Recent

Genus of gastropods

Galba is a genus of tiny oxygen breathing freshwater snails, aquatic pulmonate gastropod mollusks in the family Lymnaeidae, the pond snails.

Within the genus, the most widely recognized species is Galba truncatula.

The genus Galba is recognized from the Jurassic to the most recent periods.

== Species ==
Species within the genus Galba include:

- Galba bulimoides or Fossaria (Bakerilymnaea) bulimoides (I. Lea, 1841)
- Galba cousini (Jousseaume, 1887)
- Galba cubensis (Pfeiffer, 1839)
- Galba cyclostoma (Walker, 1908) (synonym: Fossaria cyclostoma (Walker, 1808))
- Galba dalli (F.C. Baker, 1907)
- † Galba dupuyiana (Noulet, 1854)
- Galba exigua (I. Lea, 1841)
- Galba galbana Say, 1825) (synonym: Fossaria galbana Say, 1825)
- †Galba gaudryi Wenz, 1922
- † Galba halavatsi Wenz, 1922
- Galba meridensis (Bargues, Artigas, Khoubbane & Mas-Coma, 2011)
- † Galba minor (Thomä, 1845)
- Galba modicella (Say, 1825)
- Galba neotropica (Bargues, Artigas, Mera y Sierra, Pointier & Mas-Coma, 2007)
- Galba obrussa (Say, 1825)
- Galba parva (I. Lea, 1841) (synonym: Fossaria parva (I.Lea, 1841))
- Galba pervia (Martens, 1867)
- Galba schirazensis Küster, 1862
- Galba sibirica (Westerlund, 1885)
- † Galba subminuta (Almera & Bofill y Poch, 1895)
- † Galba suboblonga (Kovalenko, 1994)
- † Galba subpalustris - a fossil species from the late Miocene
- Galba viatrix (d'Orbigny, 1835)

Subgenus Galba (Galba) Schrank, 1803

- † Galba (Galba) bulimoides (Klein, 1846) nomen dubium
- † Galba (Galba) cornea (Brongniart, 1810)
- † Galba (Galba) kenesensis (Halaváts, 1903)
- † Galba (Galba) phrygopalustris (Oppenheim, 1919)
- † Galba (Galba) praepalustris (Roman, 1907)
- † Galba (Galba) sandbergeri (Łomnicki, 1886)
- † Galba (Galba) subtruncatula (Clessin, 1885)
- † Galba (Galba) suevica (Wenz, 1916)
- Galba (Galba) truncatula (O. F. Müller, 1774) - the type species

Species brought into synonymy

- † Galba dupuyana (Noulet, 1854): synonym of † Galba dupuyiana (Noulet, 1854)
- † Galba jaccardi (Maillard, 1892): synonym of † Stagnicola jaccardi (Maillard, 1892)
- Galba montanensis F. C. Baker, 1913: synonym of Walterigalba montanensis (F. C. Baker, 1913)
- Galba occulta Jackiewicz, 1959: synonym of Ladislavella terebra (Westerlund, 1885)
- Galba pusilla Schrank, 1803: synonym of Galba truncatula (O. F. Müller, 1774)
- † Galba (Galba) armaniacensis (Noulet, 1857): synonym of † Stagnicola armaniacensis (Noulet, 1857)
- † Galba (Galba) bouilleti (Michaud, 1855): synonym of † Stagnicola bouilleti (Michaud, 1855)
- † Galba (Galba) glabra (Müller, 1774): synonym of † Omphiscola glabra (O. F. Müller, 1774)
- † Galba (Galba) heriacensis (Fontannes, 1876): synonym of † Stagnicola bouilleti (Michaud, 1855)
- † Galba (Galba) jaccardi (Maillard, 1892): synonym of † Stagnicola jaccardi (Maillard, 1892)
- † Galba (Galba) kreutzii (Łomnicki, 1886): synonym of † Stagnicola kreutzii (Łomnicki, 1886)
- Galba (Galba) palustris (Müller, 1774): synonym of Stagnicola palustris (O. F. Müller, 1774)
- † Galba (Galba) rouvillei (Fontannes, 1879): synonym of † Stagnicola bouilleti (Michaud, 1855)
- † Galba (Galba) subfragilis (d'Orbigny, 1852): synonym of † Lymnaea subfragilis d'Orbigny, 1852
- † Galba (Galba) subpalustris (Thomä, 1845): synonym of † Stagnicola subpalustris (Thomä, 1845)
