= Lymnaea tomentosa hamiltoni =

Conservation status
- Extinct

Scientific classification
- Kingdom: Animalia
- Phylum: Mollusca
- Class: Gastropoda
- Superorder: Hygrophila
- Family: Lymnaeidae
- Genus: Lymnaea
- Species: L. tomentosa
- Subspecies: L. t. hamiltoni

Trinomial name
- Lymnaea tomentosa hamiltoni (Dell, 1956)

Synonyms
- Limnaea alfredi hamiltoni Dell, 1956; Limnaea atomentosa Climo & Pullan, 1972

Extinct subspecies of gastropod

Lymnaea tomentosa hamiltoni is an extinct subspecies of freshwater snail, an aquatic gastropod mollusc in the family Lymnaeidae, the pond snails.

This subspecies was endemic to New Zealand. The shells of these snails were found in lake marls in the southern part of the South Island.
