= Fascioloides =

Scientific classification
- Kingdom: Animalia
- Phylum: Platyhelminthes
- Class: Trematoda
- Order: Plagiorchiida
- Family: Fasciolidae
- Genus: Fascioloides; Ward, 1917

Genus of flukes

Fascioloides is a genus of flatworm.

== Species ==
- Fascioloides jacksoni (Cobbold, 1869)
- Fascioloides magna (Bassi, 1875)
