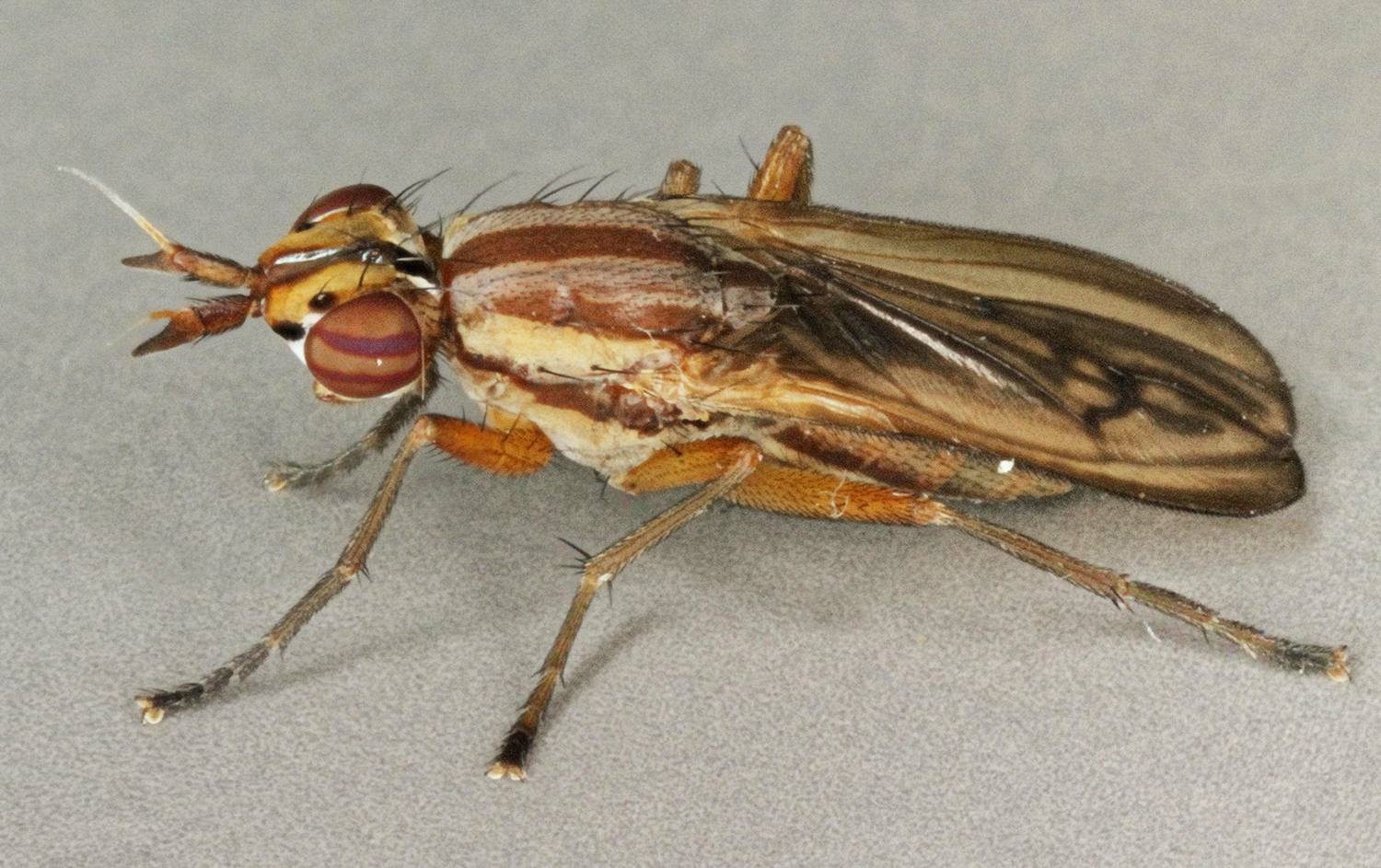
- Ilione lineata North Wales

Scientific classification
- Kingdom: Animalia
- Phylum: Arthropoda
- Class: Insecta
- Order: Diptera
- Family: Sciomyzidae
- Genus: Ilione
- Species: I. lineata

Binomial name
- Ilione lineata (Fallen, 1820)

= Ilione lineata =

Species of fly

Ilione lineata is a species of fly in the family Sciomyzidae. It is found in the Palearctic. Ilione lineata feeds obligately on pea mussels and finger nail clams (Sphaeriidae).
