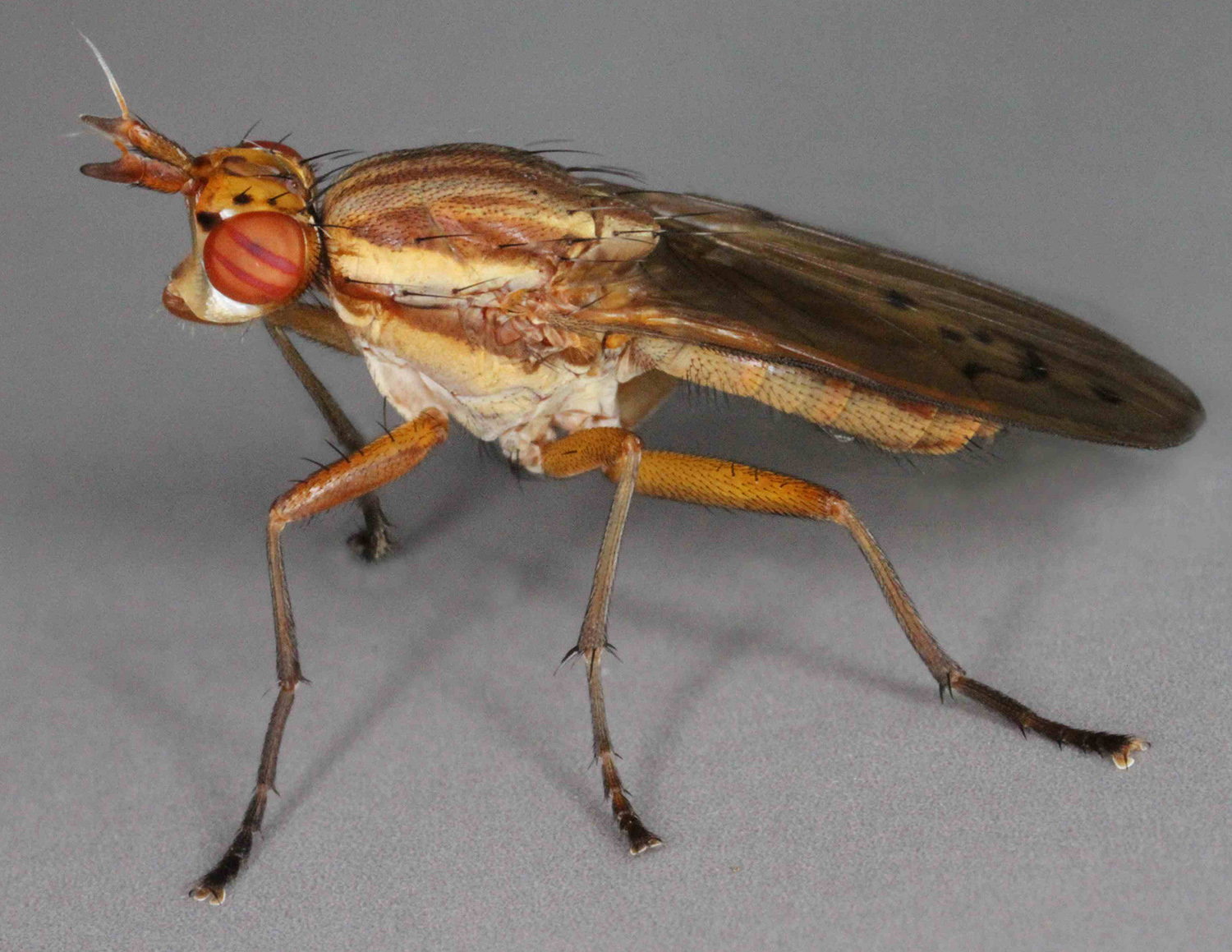
- Ilione albiseta

Scientific classification
- Domain: Eukaryota
- Kingdom: Animalia
- Phylum: Arthropoda
- Class: Insecta
- Order: Diptera
- Family: Sciomyzidae
- Subfamily: Sciomyzinae
- Tribe: Tetanocerini
- Genus: Ilione; Haliday in Curtis, 1837

Type species
- Chione communis Robineau-Desvoidy, 1830

Synonyms
- Chione Robineau-Desvoidy, 1830

= Ilione (fly) =

Genus of flies

Ilione is a genus of flies in the family Sciomyzidae, the marsh flies or snail-killing flies.

== Species ==
- Ilione Haliday in Curtis, 1837

- I. lineata (Fallén, 1820)
- I. rossica (Mayer, 1953)

- Knutsonia Verbeke, 1964

- I. albiseta (Scopoli, 1763)
- I. corcyrensis (Verbeke, 1964)
- I. trifaria (Loew, 1847)
- I. truqui (Rondani, 1863)
- I. turcestanica (Hendel, 1903)
- I. unipunctata (Macquart, 1849)
