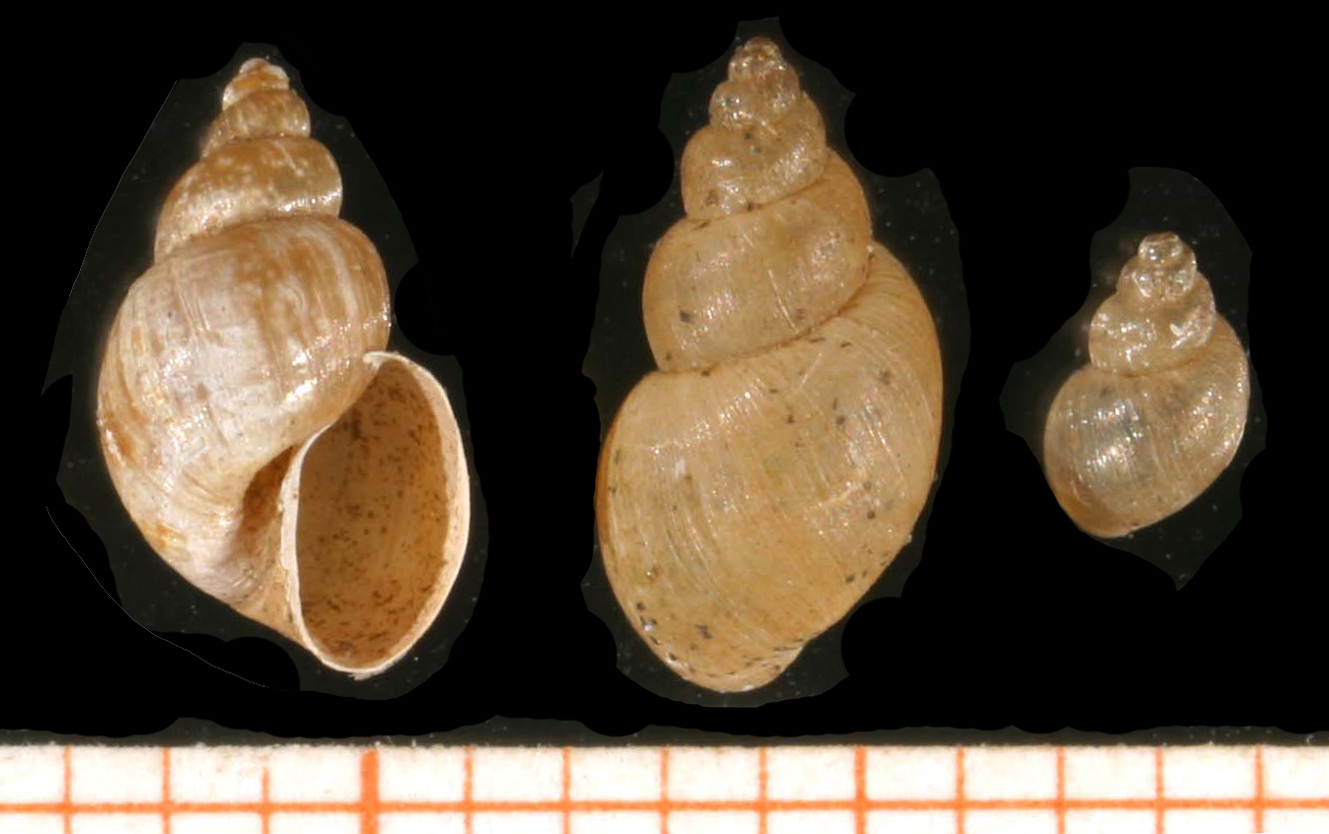
- Scale bar in mm

Conservation status
- Least Concern (IUCN 3.1)

Scientific classification
- Kingdom: Animalia
- Phylum: Mollusca
- Class: Gastropoda
- Superorder: Hygrophila
- Family: Lymnaeidae
- Genus: Galba
- Species: G. truncatula

Binomial name
- Galba truncatula (O. F. Müller, 1774)

Synonyms
- Buccinum truncatulum O. F. Müller, 1774 (original combination); Galba truncatula (O. F. Müller, 1774); Lymnaea (Galba) truncatula (Müller, 1774); Lymnaea truncatula (O. F. Müller, 1774)

= Galba truncatula =

Species of gastropod

Galba truncatula (previously: Lymnaea truncatula) is a species of air-breathing freshwater snail, an aquatic pulmonate gastropod mollusk in the family Lymnaeidae, the pond snails.

Galba truncatula is the vector mainly involved in fascioliasis transmission to humans.

== Distribution ==
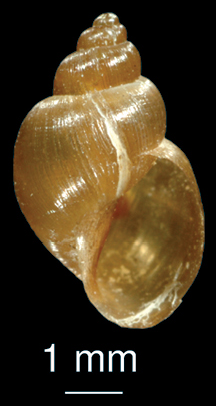
Apertural view of a shell of Galba truncatula.

Galba truncatula is believed to be native to Europe, but it has been introduced in other parts of the world. Currently, Galba truncatula is commonly distributed in all European countries, including most Mediterranean islands such as Corsica, Malta, the Azores, Madeira, the Faroe Islands, the Balearic Islands, and the Canary Islands. Despite the fact that Galba truncatula has spread worldwide, exact distribution maps of the species are not available. In addition, most reports are based on morphological determination of the snail. Molecular evidences on the presence of Galba truncatula from non-European areas are limited. Galba truncatula has also been found in North and South America, several parts of Africa, and Asia.

In South America, the presence of Galba truncatula has already been molecularly verified in Bolivia, Peru, Argentina, Chile and Venezuela. In Africa, Galba truncatula is present mainly in Northern parts (i.e. Morocco, Algeria, Tunis, Egypt) but also in South Africa, Ethiopia, Kenya, and Tanzania.

In Asia, the snail occurs in Russia but other Asian countries were reported very rarely. Galba truncatula was found in Iran, Pakistan and in Kashmir.

== Description ==
The height of the shell is 5–10 mm and the width of the shell is 2.5–6 mm.

The maximum length of the shell is 12.00 mm. Whorls are stepped. The columella is folded.

Tentacles are wider and with a wide base. Eyes are small. Mantle roof shows larger unpigmented whitish spots giving a pale appearance to the shell of living specimens by transparency.

The first bilateral teeth is tricuspid in radula. The praeputium/penis sheath length ratio is 2.50–5.90 mm (mean 3.44 mm).

Two species that have a similar morphology: Galba neotropica and Galba schirazensis. Although several phenotypic characteristics may a priori be helpful for a preliminary specimen classification, a definitive classification of a specimen can only be obtained by the sequencing of at least one of the molecular markers used: ITS-2, ITS-1, 16S and cox1. Moreover, mixed populations of Galba truncatula and Galba schirazensis have already been described in the field.

== Ecology ==
3D volume rendering of microCT scan of Galba truncatula shell.

=== Habitat ===
Galba truncatula can occupy both temporary and permanent freshwater ecosystems. The species occurs commonly in shallow well aerated water, in marshes, ponds, lakes, streams, rivers, water ditches. In France, the populations of Galba truncatula are declining because its habitat is threatened by modern agricultural practices. In case of larger water bodies, the snail occurs mostly on the edge between water and land, sometimes outside water layer on mud. Galba truncatula can be very abundant, with high population densities and it has an evident anthropophily including usual presence in human neighbourhood.

Galba truncatula is amphibious organism and can survive long dry periods. This is caused by its high ability to aestivate during drought conditions. It is known that Galba truncatula can survive 6 weeks to 4.5 months of dry periods in aestivated stage in mud. In the laboratory cultures, Kendall (1949) observed survival over 1 year in Petri dishes without water.

The species requires alkaline pH (pH range 7.0 up to 9.6) and calcium content over 0.3 mekv/L.

Galba truncatula can live at a very high altitude such as in the Northern Bolivian Altiplano (an area located between 3800 and 4100 m high altitude).

=== Feeding habits ===
Galba truncatula feed on algae and fresh or decomposed parts of plants.

=== Life cycle ===
In Europe, it has usually 2 generations per year and snails can live up to 2 years. During very wet years, the species can produce occasionally 3 generations per year.

They are hatching from eggs. The shape of egg cluster is rounded to oval shape even when containing more eggs. There are usually 2–15 eggs in cluster.

=== Parasites ===
Galba truncatula is an intermediate host for these known trematodes and nematodes:

- Fasciola hepatica
- Fasciola gigantica
- Fascioloides magna
- Haplometra cylindracea
- Plagiorchis spp.
- Opisthioglyphe spp.
- Calicophoron daubneyi
- Muellerius capillaris

Transmission capacity of fascioliasis to humans and to animals is high.
