= Rafoxanide =

Names
- Preferred IUPAC name N-[3-Chloro-4-(4-chlorophenoxy)phenyl]-2-hydroxy-3,5-diiodobenzamide
- Other names Rafoxanid, raphoxanide

Identifiers
| CAS Number | 22662-39-1 |
| 3D model (JSmol) | Interactive image |
| ChEBI | CHEBI:234200 |
| ChEMBL | ChEMBL287542 |
| ChemSpider | 29191 |
| ECHA InfoCard | 100.041.029 |
| EC Number | 245-148-9 |
| KEGG | D05693 |
| MeSH | D011888 |
| PubChem CID | 31475 |
| UNII | 22F4FLA7DH |
| CompTox Dashboard (EPA) | DTXSID5046227 |
- InChI: InChI=1S/C19H11Cl2I2NO3/c20-10-1-4-13(5-2-10)27-17-6-3-12(9-15(17)21)24-19(26)14-7-11(22)8-16(23)18(14)25/h1-9,25H,(H,24,26) Key: NEMNPWINWMHUMR-UHFFFAOYSA-N; InChI=1/C19H11Cl2I2NO3/c20-10-1-4-13(5-2-10)27-17-6-3-12(9-15(17)21)24-19(26)14-7-11(22)8-16(23)18(14)25/h1-9,25H,(H,24,26) Key: NEMNPWINWMHUMR-UHFFFAOYAP
- SMILES: C1=CC(=CC=C1OC2=C(C=C(C=C2)NC(=O)C3=CC(=CC(=C3O)I)I)Cl)Cl

Properties
| Chemical formula | C_{19}H_{11}Cl_{2}I_{2}NO_{3} |
| Molar mass | 626.01 g/mol |
| Appearance | Slight yellowish-brown injectable solution and white oral solution |
| Solubility in water | In oily solutes |

Pharmacology
| ATCvet code | QP52AG05 (WHO) |

Hazards
- Occupational safety and health (OHS/OSH)
| Main hazards | Has low safety index (6 times as normal dose) |
- Except where otherwise noted, data are given for materials in their standard state (at 25 °C [77 °F], 100 kPa). verify (what is ?) Infobox references

Rafoxanide is a salicylanilide used as an anthelmintic. It is most commonly used in ruminant animals to treat adult liver flukes of the species Fasciola hepatica and Fasciola gigantica.
