= Galba modicella =

Conservation status
- Least Concern (IUCN 3.1)

- Secure (NatureServe)

Scientific classification
- Kingdom: Animalia
- Phylum: Mollusca
- Class: Gastropoda
- Superorder: Hygrophila
- Family: Lymnaeidae
- Genus: Galba
- Species: G. modicella

Binomial name
- Galba modicella (Say, 1825)

Synonyms
- List: Fossaria modicella (Say, 1825); Galba (Galba) modicella (Say, 1825); Galba humilis modicella (Say, 1825); Limnaea jamesii Lea, 1841; Limnaea modicella (Say, 1825); Limnophysa jamesii (Lea, 1841); Lymnaea desidiosa var. modicella Say, 1825; Lymnaea humilis var. modicella (Say, 1825); Lymnaea obrussa modicella Say, 1825; Lymnaeus modicellus Say, 1825; Lymneus modicellus Say, 1825

Species of freshwater snail native to North America

Galba modicella, commonly known as the rock fossaria, is a species of freshwater snail in the family Lymnaeidae. It is native to North America.
