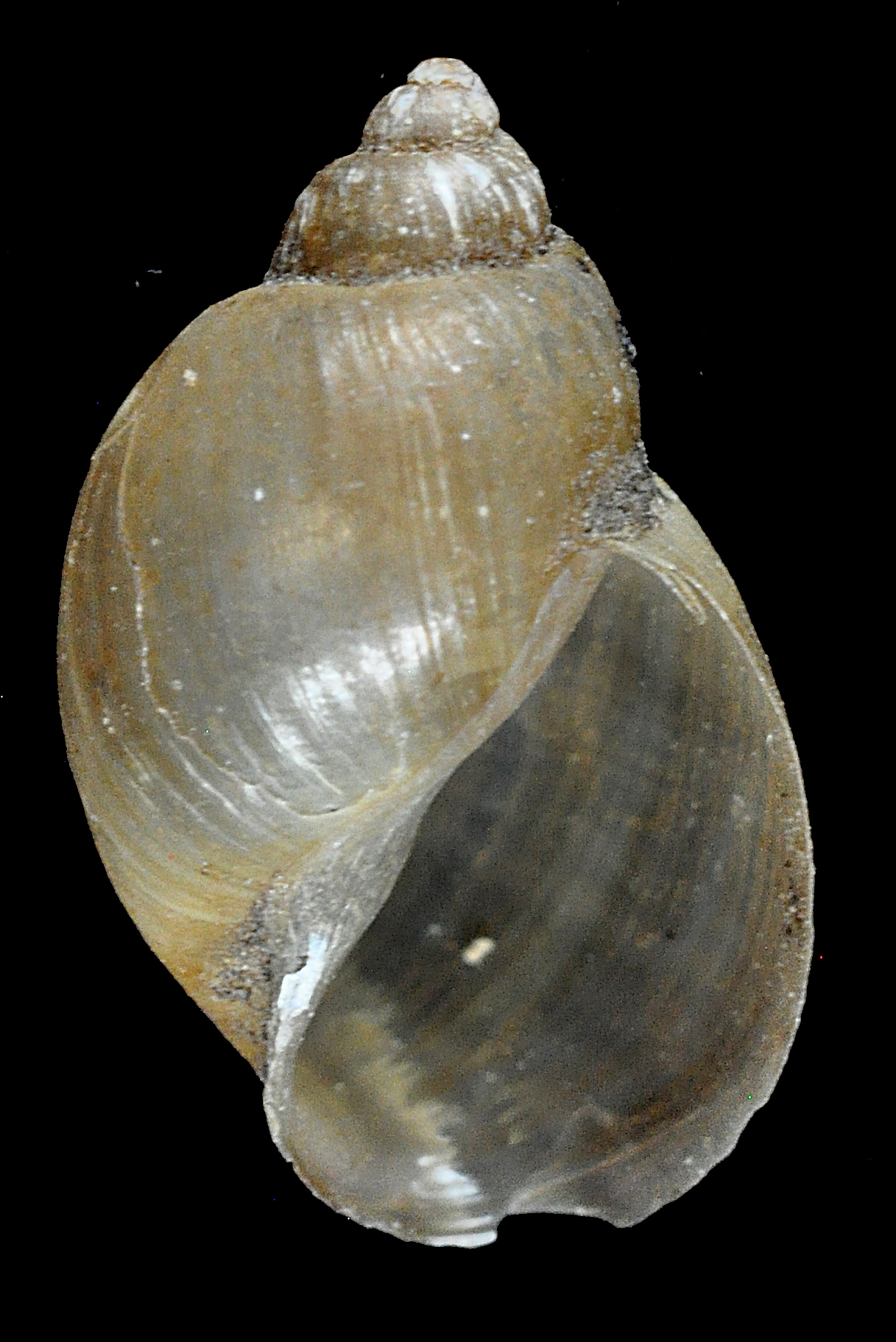
- Apertural view of a shell of Galba cousini (syntype at MNHN, Paris)

Scientific classification
- Kingdom: Animalia
- Phylum: Mollusca
- Class: Gastropoda
- Superorder: Hygrophila
- Family: Lymnaeidae
- Genus: Galba
- Species: G. cousini

Binomial name
- Galba cousini (Jousseaume, 1887)

Synonyms
- Limnaea selli Preston, 1907 (a junior synonym); Lymnaea bogotensis Pilsbry, 1935; Lymnaea cousini Jousseaume, 1887

= Galba cousini =

Species of gastropod

Galba cousini is a species of air-breathing freshwater snail, an aquatic pulmonate gastropod mollusk in the family Lymnaeidae, the pond snails.

== Description ==
The length of the shell attains 13.8 mm. Galba cousini are intermediate hosts of the liver fluke Fasciola hepatica, the causal agent of fasciolosis, a zoonotic parasitic disease.

== Distribution ==
Unlike marine snails, Galba cousini is a freshwater species endemic to the northern Andean regions of South America. Its geographic range includes high-altitude areas of Ecuador, Colombia, and Venezuela.

== Habitat ==
As an aquatic air-breathing snail, it inhabits high-altitude freshwater environments, such as ponds, marshy areas, and slow-moving streams. These habitats are ecologically significant, as the snails living there serve as intermediate hosts for the zoonotic liver fluke parasite Fasciola hepatica.
