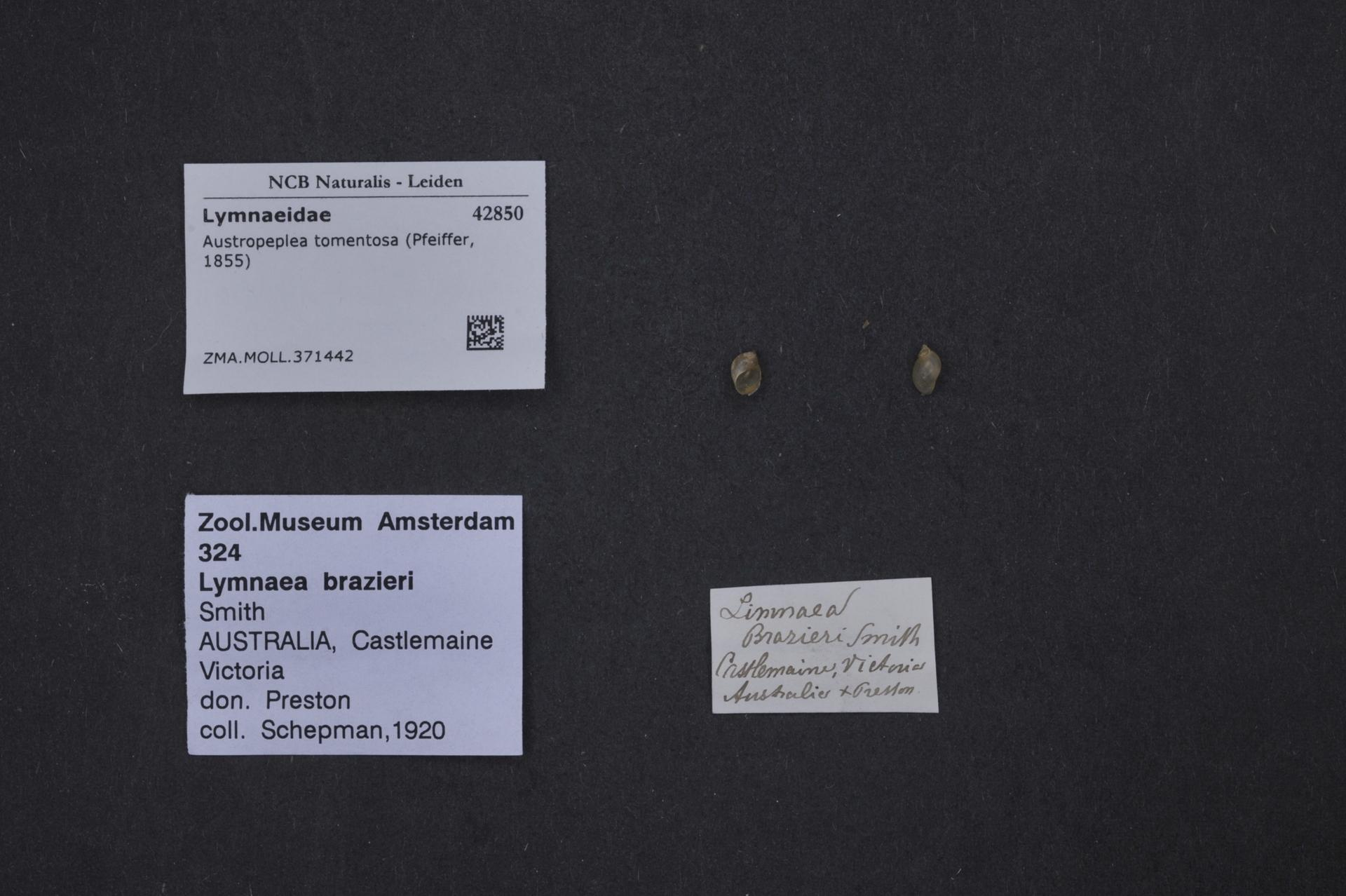
- Lymnaea tomentosa shells

Scientific classification
- Kingdom: Animalia
- Phylum: Mollusca
- Class: Gastropoda
- Superorder: Hygrophila
- Family: Lymnaeidae
- Genus: Lymnaea
- Species: L. tomentosa

Binomial name
- Lymnaea tomentosa (L. Pfeiffer, 1855)

Synonyms
- Saccinea tomentosa Pfeiffer, 1855; Limnaea arguta Hutton, 1885; Limnaea ampulla Hutton, 1885; Limnaea tomentosa Hutton, 1885; Amphipeplea ampulla globosa Suter, 1891; Myxas ampulla waikariensis umber, 1941; Limnaea tomentosa Climo and Pul lan, 1972; Austropeplea (Lymnaea) tomentosa

= Lymnaea tomentosa =

Species of gastropod

Lymnaea tomentosa is a species of freshwater snail, an aquatic gastropod mollusc in the family Lymnaeidae.

This species lives in New Zealand. These snails are found in both the North and South Islands and on aquatic plants in swamps, ponds, and quiet waters. In Australia (in particular South-East New South Wales), this species was reported to serve as one of the most important intermediate hosts for liver fluke (Fasciola hepatica).

== Subspecies ==
- Lymnaea tomentosa hamiltoni (Dell, 1956)
- Lymnaea tomentosa tomentosa (L. Pfeiffer, 1855)

== Parasites ==
Lymnaea tomentosa is an intermediate host of Fasciola hepatica. Lymnaea tomentosa was also shown to be receptive to miracidia of Fasciola gigantica from East Africa, Malaysia and Indonesia under laboratory conditions.
