= List of non-marine molluscs of the United States =

The non-marine mollusks of the United States are a part of the molluscan fauna of the United States.

== Freshwater gastropods ==
Amnicolidae

- Amnicola cora Hubricht 1979 - Foushee cavesnail
- Amnicola dalli Pilsbry and Beecher 1892 - peninsula amnicola
- Amnicola decisus Haldeman 1845
- Amnicola limosus Say 1817 - mud amnicola
- Ammicola rhombostomus Thompson 1968 - squaremouth amnicola
- Amnicola stygius Hubricht 1971 - Stygian amnicola
- Colligyrus convexus Hershler, Fresh, Liu, and Johannes 2003 - canary dusky-snail
- Colligyrus depressus Hershler 1999 - Harney Basin duskysnail
- Colligyrus greggi Pilsbry 1935 - Rocky Mountain duskysnail
- Dasyscias franzi Thompson and Hersler 1991 - shaggy ghostsnail
- Lyogyrus bakerianus Pilsbry 1917 - Baker's springsnail
- Lyogyrus browni Carpenter 1872 - slender duskysnail
- Lyogyrus granum Say 1822 - squat duskysnail
- Lyogyrus latus Thompson and Hershler 1991 - cobble sprite
- Lyogyrus pilsbryi Walker 1906 - lake duskysnail
- Lyogyrus pupoideus Gould 1841 - pupa duskysnail
- Lyogyrus retromargo Thompson 1968 - indented duskysnail
- Lyogyrus walkeri Pilsbry 1898 - Canadian duskysnail

Pleuroceridae

- Lithasia armigera - armigerous river snail or armored rocksnail
- Lithasia curta - knobby rocksnail
- Lithasia duttoniana - Dutton's river snail
- Lithasia geniculata - geniculate river snail
- Lithasia jayana - Jay's river snail
- Lithasia lima - Elk River file snail
- Lithasia salebrosa - muddy rocksnail
- Lithasia verrucosa - varicose rocksnail

Hydrobiidae

- Tryonia alamosae - Alamosa springsnail
- Marstonia pachyta - armored marstonia (synonym: Pyrgulopsis pachyta)
- Pyrgulopsis erythropoma - Ash Meadows pebblesnail
- Somatogyrus humerosus - atlas pebblesnail

Planorbidae

- Amphigyra alabamensis Pilsbry 1906 shoal sprite
- Biomphalaria havanensis Pfeiffer 1839 - ghost ramshorn
- Ferrissia fragilis Tryon 1863 - fragile ancylid (limpet)
- Ferrissia rivularis Say 1817 - creeping ancylid (limpet)
- Gyraulus circumstriatus Tryon 1866 - disc gyro
- Gyraulus crista Linnaeus 1758 - star gyro
- Gyraulus deflectus Say 1824 - flexed gyro
- Gyraulus hornensis Baker 1934 - tuba gyro
- Gyraulus parvus Say 1817 - ash gyro
- Gyraulus vermicularis Gould 1847 - Pacific coast gyro
- Hebetancylus excentricus Morelet 1851 - excentric ancylid (limpet)
- Helisoma anceps Menke 1830 - two-ridge ramshorn
- Helisoma minus Cooper 1870
- Helisoma newberryi Lea 1858 - Great Basin ramshorn
- Laevapex fuscus Adams 1841 - dusky ancylid
- Menetus dilatatus Gould 1841 - bugle sprite
- Menetus opercularis Gould 1847 - button sprite
- Micromenetus brogniartianus Lea 1842 - disc sprite
- Micromenetus floridensis Baker 1945 - penny sprite
- Micromenetus sampsoni Ancey 1885 - Sampson sprite
- Neoplanorbis carinatus Walker 1908 - carinate flat-top snail
- Neoplanorbis smithii Walker 1908 - angled flat-top snail
- Neoplanorbis tantillus Pilsbry 1906 - little flat-top snail
- Neoplanorbis umbilicatus Walker 1908 - umbilicate flat-top snail
- Pecosorbis kansasensis Berry 1966 - New Mexico ramshorn
- Planorbella ammon Gould 1855 - Jupiter ramshorn
- Planorbella binneyi Tryon 1867 - coarse ramshorn
- Planorbella campanulata Say 1821 - bellmouth ramshorn
- Planorbella columbiensis Baker 1945 - caribou ramshorn
- Planorbella corpulenta Say 1824 - rorpulent ramshorn
- Planorbella duryi Wetherby 1879 - seminole ramshorn
- Planorbella magnifica Pilsbry 1903 - magnificent ramshorn
- Planorbella multivolvis Case 1847 - acorn ramshorn
- Planorbella occidentalis Cooper 1870 - fine-lined ramshorn
- Planorbella oregonensis Tryon 1865 - lamb ramshorn
- Planorbella pilsbryi Baker 1926 - file ramshorn
- Planorbella scalaris Jay 1839 - mesa ramshorn
- Planorbella subcrenata Carpenter 1857 - rough ramshorn
- Planorbella tenuis Dunker 1850 - Mexican ramshorn
- Planorbella traski Lea 1856 - keeled ramshorn
- Planorbella trivolvis Say 1817 - marsh ramshorn
- Planorbella truncata Miles 1861 - druid ramshorn
- Planorbula armigera Say 1821 - thicklip ramshorn
- Planorbula campestris Dawson 1875 - meadow ramshorn
- Promenetus exacuous Say 1821 - sharp sprite
- Promenetus umbillicatellus Cockerell 1887 - thicklip ramshorn
- Rhodacmea cahawbensis Walker 1917 - cahaba ancylid
- Rhodacmea elatior Anthony 1855 - domed ancylid
- Rhodacmea filosa Conrad 1834 - wicker ancylid
- Rhodacmea hinkleyi Walker 1908 - knobby ancylid
- Vorticifex effusa Lea 1856 - Artemesian ramshorn
- Vorticifex solida Dall 1870

Physidae

- Aplexa elongata Say 1821 - lance aplexa
- Archiphysa ashmuni Taylor 2003 - San Rafael physa
- Archiphysa sonomae Taylor 2003 - Sonoma physa
- Laurentiphysa chippuvarum Taylor 2003 - Chippewa physa
- Physa carolinae Wethington, Dillon, Wise 2009 - Carolina physa
- Physa jennessi Dall 1919 - obtuse physa
- Physa megalochlamys Taylor 1988 - cloaked physa
- Physa natricina Taylor 1988 - Snake River physa
- Physa sibirica Westerlund 1876 - frigid physa
- Physa skinneri Taylor 1954 - glass physa
- Physa vernalis Taylor and Jokinen 1984 - vernal physa
- Physella acuta - tadpole snail
- Physella ancillaria Say 1825 - pumpkin physa
- Physella bermudezi Aguayo 1935 - lowdome physa
- Physella bottimeri Clench 1924 - Comanche physa
- Physella boucardi Cross and Fischer 1881 - desert physa
- Physella columbiana Hemphill 1890 - rotund physa
- Physella conoidea Fischer and Crosse 1886 - Texas physa
- Physella cooperi Tryon 1865 - olive physa
- Physella costata Newcomb 1861 - ornate physa
- Physella cubensis Pfeiffer 1839 - carib physa
- Physella globosa Haldeman 1841 - globose physa
- Physella gyrina Say 1821 - tadpole physa
  - Physella gyrina propinqua Tryon 1865 - Rocky Mountain physa
  - Physella gyrina utahensis Clench 1925 - tadpole physa
- Physella hemphilli Taylor 2003 - Idaho physa
- Physella hendersoni Clench 1925 - bayou physa
- Physella heterostropha Say 1817 - pewter physa
- Physella hordacea Lea 1864 - grain physa
- Physella humerosa Gould 1855 - corkscrew physa
- Physella integra Haldeman 1841 - ashy physa
- Physella johnsoni Clench 1926 - Banff Springs physa
- Physella lordi Baird 1863 - twisted physa
- Physella magnalacustris Walker 1901 - Great Lakes physa
- Physella mexicana Phillippi 1841 - polished physa
- Physella microstriata Chamberlain and Berry 1930 - Fish Lake physa (U.S. endemic/extinct)
- Physella natricina - Snake River physa snail
- Physella osculans Haldeman 1841 - Cayuse physa
- Physella parkeri Currier 1881 - broadshoulder physa
- Physella pomilla Conrad 1834 - Claiborne physa
- Physella spelunca Turner and Clench 1974 - cave physa
- Physella squalida Morelet 1851 - squalid physa
- Physella traski Lea 1864 - sculpted physa
- Physella vinosa Gould 1847 - banded physa
- Physella virgata Gould 1855 - protean physa
- Physella virginea Gould 1847 - sunset physa
- Physella winnipegensis Pip 2004 - Lake Winnipeg physa
- Physella wrighti Te and Clark 1985 - hotwater physa
- Physella zionis Pilsbry 1926 - wet-rock physa

Lymnaeidae

- Stagnicola bonnevillensis
- Stagnicola utahensis - thickshell pondsnail

== Land gastropods ==
Land gastropods in the USA include:

Charopidae

- Radiodomus abietum (H.B. Baker, 1930)

Discidae

- Anguispira alternata (Say, 1816) - flamed tigersnail
- Anguispira jessica Kutchka, 1938 - mountain tigersnail
- Anguispira kochi (L. Pfeiffer, 1846) - banded tigersnail
- Anguispira nimapuna H.B. Baker, 1932 - nimapuna
- Anguispira strongyloides (Pfeiffer, 1854) - southeastern tigersnail
- Discus nigrimontanus (Pilsbry, 1924)
- Discus patulus (Deshayes, 1830)

Helicodiscidae

- Helicodiscus barri Hubricht, 1962
- Helicodiscus parallelus (Say, 1821)

Oreohelicidae

- Oreohelix idahoensis (Hemphill, 1890)
- Oreohelix strigosa depressa Pilsbry, 1904
- Oreohelix vortex S.S. Berry, 1932

Polygyridae

- Fumonelix archeri - Archer's toothed land snail
- Fumonelix jonesiana- big-tooth covert, Jones' middle-toothed land snail

Punctidae

- Punctum pygmaeum
- Servanda alpina
- Servanda americana
- Servanda australis
- Servanda bakeri
- Servanda canadensis
- Servanda decora
- Servanda larvata
- Servanda lugubris
- Servanda maculata
- Servanda nebulosa
- Servanda regalis
- Servanda robusta
- Servanda rustica

== Freshwater bivalves ==
Unionidae

- Quadrula — many species
  - Quadrula apiculata — southern mapleleaf
  - Quadrula aurea — golden orb
  - Quadrula tuberosa — rough rockshell (extinct)

== Federally endangered or threatened ==
=== Federally endangered or threatened freshwater molluscs ===
There are 34 freshwater gastropod taxa on this list. The only marine endangered gastropod is Haliotis sorenseni. The only overseas endangered land snail is Papustyla pulcherrima. Altogether 36 gastropod species are federally listed as of 2 October 2009.

Scientific name	Common name	Home range	status
Alasmidonta heterodon	Dwarf wedgemussel	Connecticut, Delaware, District of Columbia, Massachusetts, Maryland, North Carolina, New Hampshire, New Jersey, New York, Pennsylvania, Virginia, Vermont	E
Antrobia culveri	Tumbling creek cavesnail	Missouri	E
Assiminea pecos	Pecos Assiminea snail	New Mexico, Texas, Mexico (in salt marshes)	E
Athearnia anthonyi	Anthony's riversnail	Alabama, Tennessee	E
Campeloma decampi	Slender campeloma	Alabama	E
Elimia crenatella	Lacy elimia	Alabama	T
Epioblasma obliquata	Purple catspaw	Ohio, Kentucky, Tennessee	E
Epioblasma perobliqua	White catspaw	Ohio, Michigan, Indiana	E
Erinna newcombi	Newcomb's snail	Hawaii	T
Idaholanx fresti	Banbury Springs lanx	Idaho	E
Juturnia kosteri/Tryonia kosteri	Koster's springsnail/Koster's tryonia	New Mexico	E
Leptoxis ampla	Round rocksnail	Alabama	T
Leptoxis plicata	Plicate rocksnail	Alabama	E
Leptoxis taeniata	Painted rocksnail	Alabama	T
Lepyrium showalteri	Flat pebblesnail	Alabama	E
Lioplax cyclostomatiformis	Cylindrical lioplax	Alabama	E
Marstonia ogmoraphe (listed as Pyrgulopsis ogmorhaphe)	Royal marstonia	Tennessee	E
Marstonia pachyta (listed as Pyrgulopsis pachyta)	Armored marstonia	Alabama	E
Physa natricina	Snake river physa snail	Idaho	E
Physella spelunca	Cave physa	U.S. endemic, caves	V
Physella utahensis	Utah physa	Utah; U.S. endemic	V
Physella zionis	Wet rock physa	Zion National Park, Utah; U.S. endemic	V
Pyrgulopsis bruneauensis	Bruneau Hot Springsnail	Idaho	E
Pyrgulopsis neomexicana	Socorro springsnail	New Mexico	E
Pyrgulopsis roswellensis	Roswell springsnail	New Mexico	E
Quadrula asperata	Alabama orb freshwater mussel	Alabama region; U.S. endemic	NT
Quadrula couchiana	Rio Grande monkeyface freshwater mussel	Rio Grande region; U.S. endemic	CE
Quadrula cylindrica	Rabbitsfoot freshwater mussel	U.S. endemic	V
Quadrula fragosa	Winged Mapleleaf freshwater mussel	Wisconsin, Minnesota, and Missouri; U.S. endemic	CE
Quadrula houstonensis	Smooth pimpleback freshwater mussel	Texas region; U.S. endemic	CE
Quadrula intermedia	Cumberland monkeyface pearly mussel	Appalachia region: western Virginia + eastern Tennessee	CE
Quadrula metanevra	Monkeyface freshwater mussel	Southeastern United States	NE
Quadrula pustulosa	Pimpleback freshwater mussel	Southeastern United States	NE
Quadrula quadrula	Mapleleaf freshwater mussel	northern Eastern United States + Eastern Canada	LC
Quadrula refulgens	Purple pimpleback freshwater mussel	U.S. endemic	NT
Quadrula rumphiana	Ridged mapleleaf freshwater mussel	U.S. endemic	NT
Quadrula sparsa	Appalachian monkey-face pearly mussel	Appalachia region: western Virginia + eastern Tennessee	CE
Quadrula stapes	Stirrup shell	Alabama + Mississippi; U.S. endemic	CE — Extinct
Stagnicola utahensis	Thickshell pondsnail	Utah Lake, Utah; U.S. endemic	CE
Taylorconcha serpenticola	Bliss Rapids snail	Idaho	T
Tryonia alamosae	Alamosa springsnail	New Mexico	E
Tulotoma magnifica	Alabama live-bearing snail	Alabama	E
Valvata utahensis	Utah roundmouth snail	Idaho, extirpaded from Utah	E

=== Federally endangered or threatened land gastropods ===
Common name	Scientific name	Home range	status
Oʻahu tree snails	Achatinella spp.	Hawaii	E
Painted snake-coiled forest snail	Anguispira picta	Tennessee	T
Iowa Pleistocene snail	Discus macclintocki	Illinois, Iowa	E
Morro Shoulderband snail	Helminthoglypta walkeriana	California	E
Magazine Mountain shagreen	Mesodon magazinensis	Arkansas	T
Chittenango ovate amber snail	Novisuccinea chittenangoensis	New York	T
Stock Island tree snail	Orthalicus reses (not including O. r. nesodryas)	Florida	T
Kanab Ambersnail	Oxyloma haydeni kanabensis	Arizona, Utah	E
Noonday globe	Patera clarki nantahala	North Carolina	T
Virginia fringed mountain snail	Polygyriscus virginianus	Virginia	E
Flat-spired three-toothed snail	Triodopsis platysayoides	West Virginia	T

== See also ==
- United States Fish and Wildlife Service list of endangered species

Lists of molluscs of surrounding countries:

- List of non-marine molluscs of Canada
- List of non-marine molluscs of Mexico
- List of non-marine molluscs of Cuba
