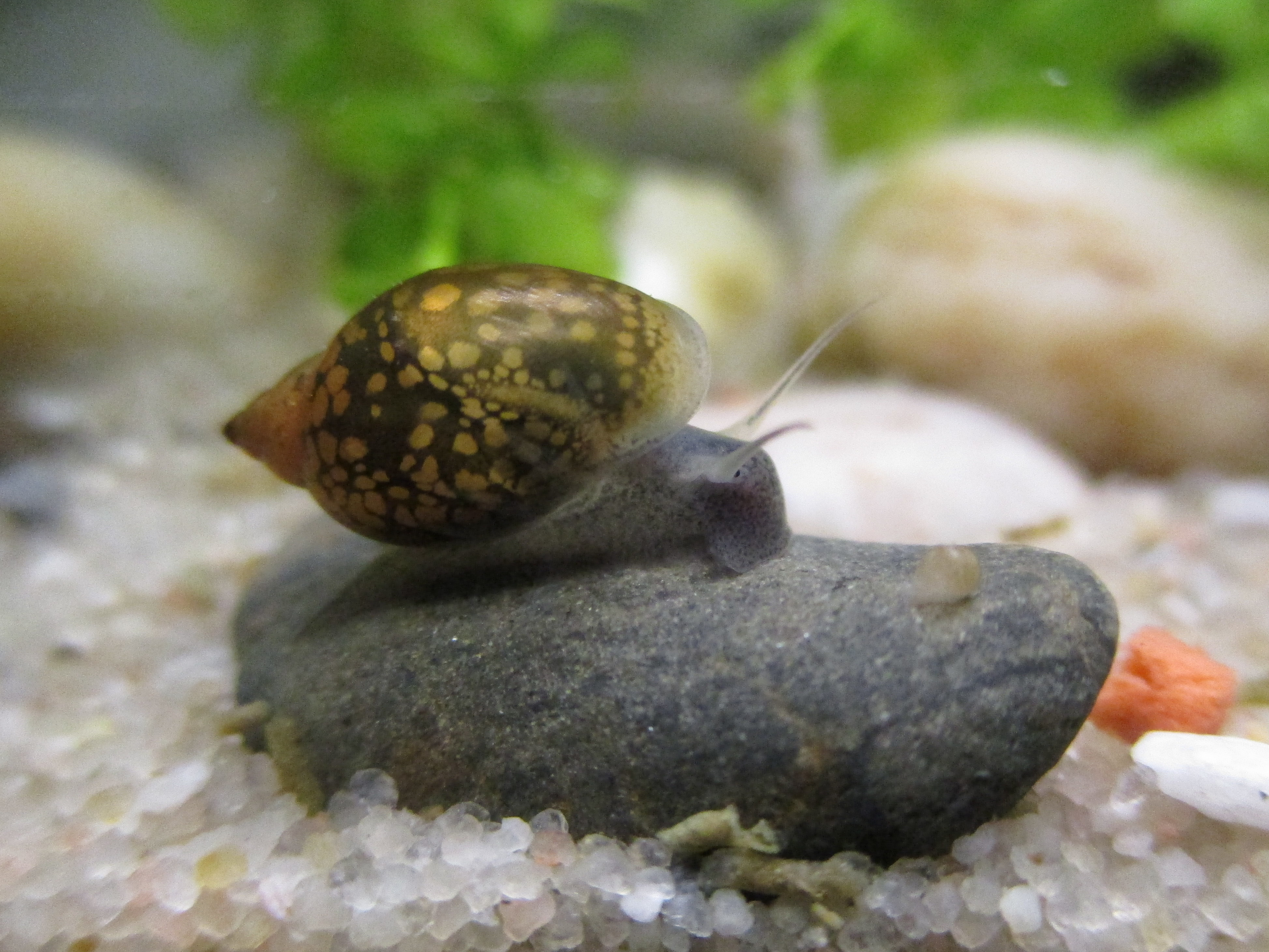
- A live individual of Physella acuta

Conservation status
- Least Concern (IUCN 3.1)

- Secure (NatureServe)

Scientific classification
- Kingdom: Animalia
- Phylum: Mollusca
- Class: Gastropoda
- Superorder: Hygrophila
- Family: Physidae
- Genus: Physella
- Species: P. acuta

Binomial name
- Physella acuta (Draparnaud, 1805)

Synonyms
- Selected synonyms: Haitia acuta (Draparnaud, 1805); Physa acuta Draparnaud, 1805; Physa cubensis L. Pfeiffer, 1839; Physa heterostropha (Say, 1817); Physa integra Haldeman, 1841; Physa virgata A. Gould, 1855

= Physella acuta =

Species of freshwater snail

Physella acuta, also known as the European physa, tadpole snail, sewage snail, bladder snail, or acute bladder snail, is a species of small, air-breathing freshwater snail of the family Physidae. It originates from North America and was first described in 1805 by Jacques Philippe Raymond Draparnaud based on a specimen found in France. Like other physids, P. acuta presents a sinistral (left-coiling) shell as well as a unique set of muscles called the physid musculature that allows it to rapidly twist the shell as a defence mechanism.

P. acuta is invasive on all continents except Antarctica and is considered by Dillon and colleagues (2002) as "the world's most cosmopolitan freshwater gastropod". Its first introduction outside North America likely occurred through the 18th-century cotton trade to Europe, while later spread mainly happened through the aquarium trade. The species can occupy diverse freshwater habitats and tolerates polluted as well as oxygen-poor environments. It can reproduce with other individuals and also self-fertilise. Due to its high reproductive rate and tolerance to habitat degradation, it frequently outcompetes native snail species. Prevalence of parasitic infections within invasive P. acuta populations is often low, but a 2024 study detected the human parasite Echinostoma (which causes a disease known as echinostomiasis upon infecting the gastrointestinal tract) in an individual from Rio de Janeiro, Brazil. In aquariums, P. acuta is usually introduced through ornamental plants and can become a "nuisance snail" due to its rapid reproduction. However, a controlled population in an aquarium can help clean up organic leftovers and control algal growth.

== Etymology and taxonomy ==
Physella acuta is commonly known as European physa, tadpole snail, sewage snail, bladder snail, or acute bladder snail. The species was first described as Physa acuta in 1805 by Jacques Philippe Raymond Draparnaud, based on a specimen found in the Garonne catchment in France. The specific epithet acuta is Latin for 'sharp'. In 1817 Thomas Say independently described the same species in Pennsylvania, naming it Physa heterostropha. This and several other newly described species, such as Physella virgata and Physella integra (described from North America), as well as Physella cubensis (described from Central America), were considered distinct from each other until molecular and reproductive studies at the beginning of the 21st century revealed them to be synonyms of P. acuta. Since 2021, molecular phylogenetic studies (which investigate evolutionary relationships using genetic data) have reported stronger evidence for moving the species from its original genus Physa to Physella.

As of 2025 the World Register of Marine Species (WoRMS) accepts the taxonomic classification proposed by Albrecht and colleagues (2025). The authors place P. acuta in the genus Physella, with Physa (the genus to which it was previously assigned) and Stenophysa as sister groups. Together, these three genera form the subfamily named Physinae. The family Physidae consists of Physinae and the genus Aplexa. P. acuta's current classification is shown in the simplified cladogram below.

- Physidae
  - Physinae
    - - Physella
        - - - Physella acuta
            - Physella spelunca
          - - Physella natricina
            - Physella zionis
        - - Physella gyrina
          - Physella pomilia
      - Physa
        - - - Physa skinneri
            - Physa jennessi
          - Physa fontinalis
        - Physa vernalis
    - Stenophysa
  - Aplexa
    - - Aplexa hypnorum
      - Aplexa elongata

While the family Physidae is well established, the structure of its subfamily Physinae remains unclear as of 2021. Debates include the taxonomic relationships between Physinae members as well as the definition and number of physinine genera and species, which in turn affect how individual taxa, including P. acuta, are defined and assigned. Consequently, P. acuta's classification as Physella is not universally accepted, and other authors and databases continue to use synonyms like Physa acuta or Haitia acuta. This taxonomic uncertainty is partly due to vague descriptions in early works that could apply to multiple taxa, and to the generalist nature of physids, including P. acuta, which lead to morphological plasticity (variation in morphology in response to environmental conditions) and rapid evolution.

== Description ==
=== External anatomy ===
==== Shell ====
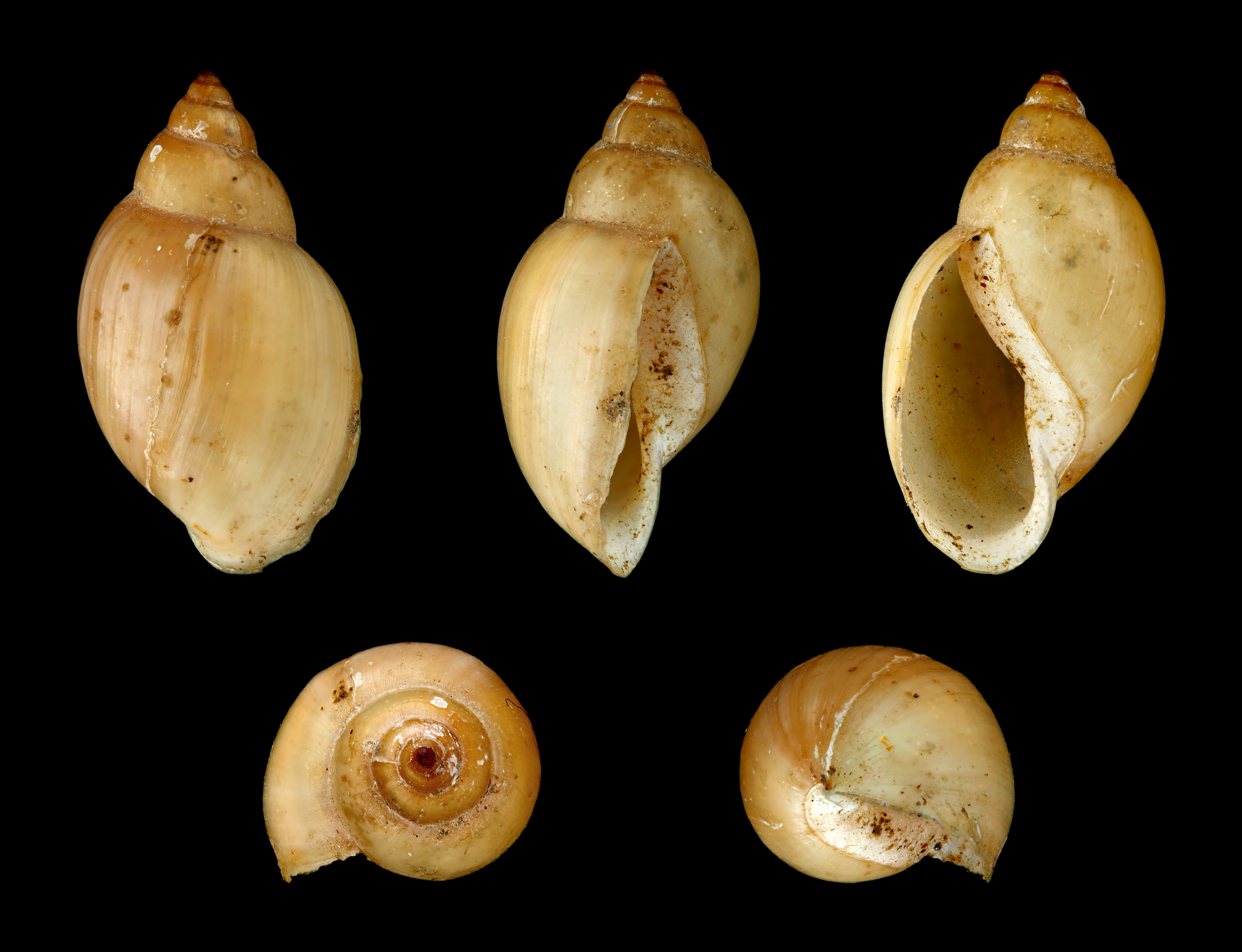
Shell of Physella acuta

Like other members of the family Physidae, the shell of P. acuta lacks an operculum, a "trapdoor" that closes the aperture (shell opening), and is sinistral. Sinistral shells are left-coiling, meaning that when held with the aperture facing the observer and the spire (coiled part of the shell) pointing upward, the aperture is on the left-hand side. The shell is small, reaching up to 16 mm (0.63 in) length and 9 mm (0.35 in) in width. It forms a high spiral of five to six whorls (complete revolutions) which take about two-thirds of the shell length and end in a pointed apex (tip). Sutures (grooves between the whorls) are impressed and clearly visible. The aperture is ear-shaped and extends about three-quarters of the total shell height. Both the columella (central pillar within the shell) and the apertural lip (the opening's margin) are white. The shell surface is smooth and ranges in colour from pale horn to brownish yellow. P. acuta's shell is thin, but shell thickness increases in the presence of predators, a response known as "adaptive plasticity". This response is weaker in individuals born through self-fertilisation (when the snail reproduces with itself), which also develop thinner shells. In 2010 Auld and Relyea reported shell thickness in P. acuta ranging from 0.15 mm (0.0059 in) to 0.35 mm (0.014 in), depending on predator cues in the environment and self-fertilisation rates.

The species presents a high diversity of shell shapes which led to numerous false species descriptions before the onset of molecular phylogenetic studies at the beginning of the 21st century. Shells of P. acuta can be especially difficult to distinguish from those of Physella gyrina and Stenophysa marmorata if live specimens are not available, since body morphology provides key distinguishing features. Typically, P. gyrina has a shorter spire with shallower sutures and a larger shell which can exceed 13 millimetres (0.51 in) length. The shell of S. marmorata is longer and narrower.

==== Soft parts ====
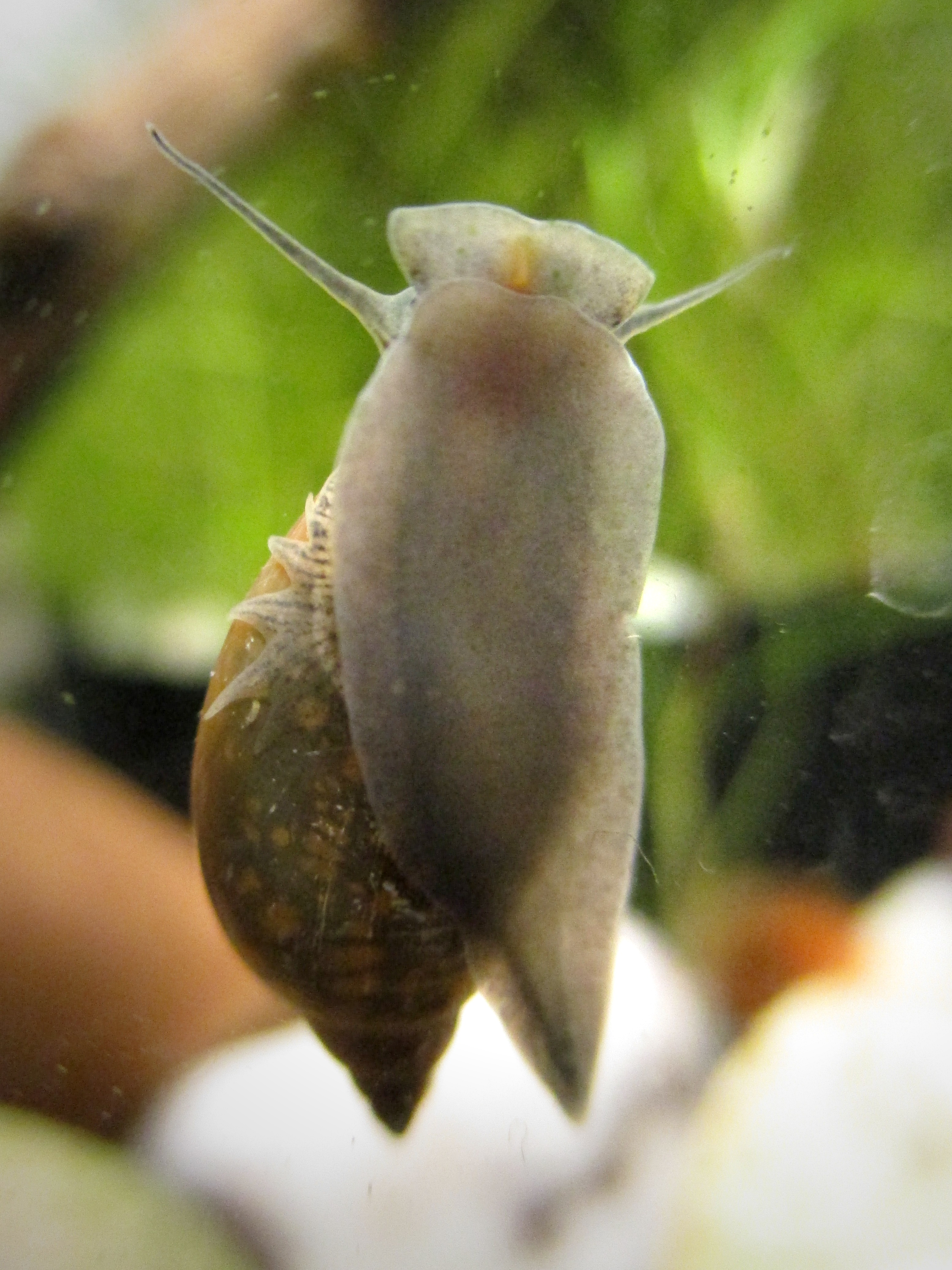
Physella acuta on an aquarium glass

The body of P. acuta is very variable in colour, which can range from blue to dark grey. The top mantle (tissue covering the visceral mass of the animal) has golden spots often visible under the thin shell. Finger-like lobes extend from the mantle on both sides of the body (7–11 on the right side and 4–6 on the left), smaller than in other physids such as Physa fontinalis or Stenophysa marmorata. They can act as an accessory gill by extracting additional oxygen from the environment and help detect predators through their touch-sensitive tissue. The tentacles are grey and follow the build of other members within the family Physidae: cylindrical and slender, almost transparent, with small black eyes at the base. These pit eyes only distinguish between light and dark. The foot is narrow and ends in a pointed tail, as is also typical of the family. The mouth edge is large and flared. The body is an important point of distinction from P. gyrina and S. marmorata: P. gyrina has whitish spots over its whole dark grey body including the tentacles. The mantle extensions of S. marmorata are not digitated and extend broadly over the sides of the shell and this species has a black stripe running through the middle of the tail.

Shell-shaking by Physella acuta to ward off a mating attempt

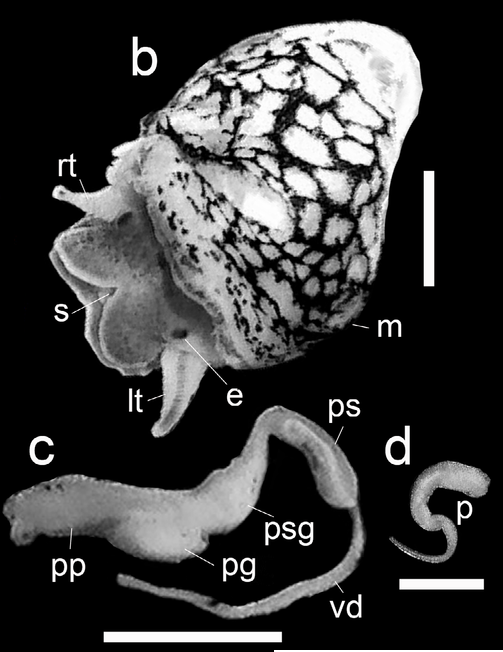
Physella acuta's body (b) and male reproductive organs (c) with the penis shown separately (d). pg = preputial gland, pp = prepuce, ps = penis sheath

=== Internal anatomy ===
Like all members of the family Physidae, P. acuta has a pulmonary cavity within the mantle which enables it to take oxygen from the water or from the air. It also has a specialised set of muscles called the physid musculature, unique among gastropods. Based on dissections, Naranjo-García and Appleton (2009) proposed that these muscles allow the snail to rapidly twist its shell in clockwise rotations of up to 120°. This shell-shaking movement is an important defence against slow-moving predators like leeches and fly larvae, which cannot properly attach to the moving shell. However, it is not effective when predators are fast-moving and actively pursue the snails, as is the case with water bugs.

The physid musculature has two main parts. The first is the physid muscle sensu stricto, meaning the muscle "in the strict sense" because it is the major component of the musculature complex. It is a branched muscle that anchors the side of the snail's body to its neck, head, foot, and mantle. The second part is the fan muscle, a group of thin, broad fibres that fan out from the base of the muscle sensu stricto toward the mantle roof. According to Naranjo-García and Appleton (2009), the configuration and attachment points of these muscles are consistent with a shell-twisting role, allowing them to provide the twisting force, serve as a base for the movement, anchor the shell to the body, and help return the shell to its original position afterwards.

P. acuta is a simultaneous hermaphrodite, meaning it has both male and female reproductive organs functioning at the same time. In Physidae, the male organs are important for taxonomic identification and consist of prepuce, penis sheath, and penis. The prepuce is a tube that releases or receives sperm from outside and, in the case of P. acuta, includes a small, lentil-shaped gland (the preputial gland). It is wider and twice as long as the muscular penis sheath. The penis is 160–180 μm in length, elongated and narrow along most of its length but ending in a wider, rounded tip. The penis musculature consists of circular muscles in both the outer and inner layers, while the intermediate layer has only longitudinal muscles. Together with molecular phylogenetic data, this musculature pattern can be used to distinguish major groups within the superorder Hygrophila. The female organs are less frequently described in detail. They consist of a convoluted oviduct (which transports the eggs to the outside), a nidamental gland (which secretes the egg capsule), and a vagina connected to the spermathecal duct (which receives sperm).

== Distribution ==
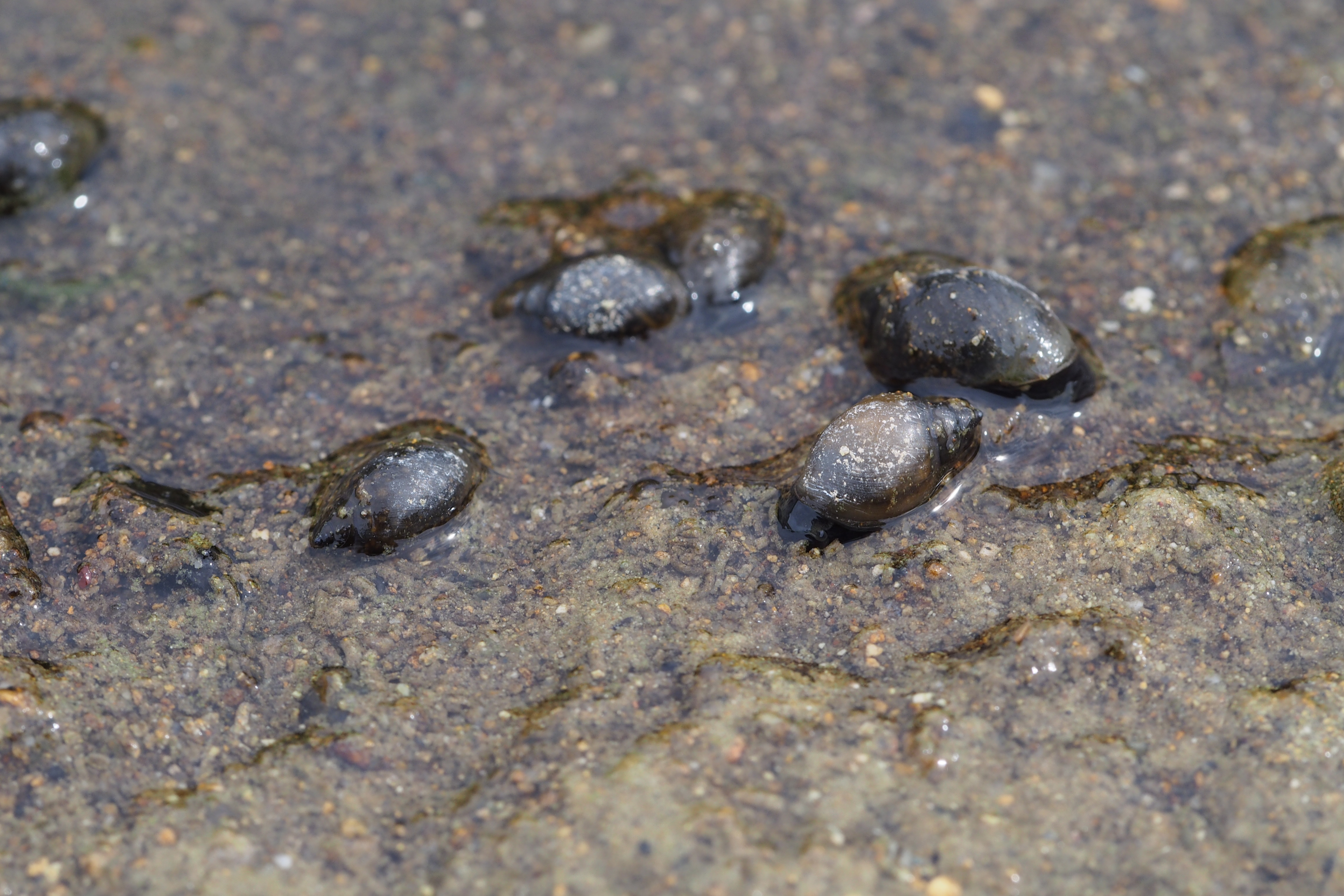
Physella acuta found near Akashi, Japan, far outside the species' native range

P. acuta is widely dispersed across the globe, largely due to the aquarium trade. It is an invasive species which can be found on all continents except Antarctica and is considered by Dillon and colleagues (2002) as "the world's most cosmopolitan freshwater gastropod".

P. acuta was originally thought to be a European species, as its first record in North America following Draparnaud's initial description was only published in 1997. However, reproductive isolation experiments and molecular genetic studies revealed it to be the same species as the North American Physella heterostropha and Physa integra. Comparative anatomy, fossil evidence, and phylogenetic data also support a North American origin, specifically within the United States. However, its exact native range within the country remains debated, with hypotheses for both eastern and western origins. The timing and pathway of P. acuta's first arrival in Europe are also uncertain. Anderson (2003) links it back to eastern U.S. populations via the 18th-century cotton trade. This hypothesis is based on the fact that Draparnaud's description happened during a time when the U.S. and France had trade relations, with traffic between the ports of Mississippi and Bordeaux. Other hypotheses for P. acuta's first introduction to Europe have also been proposed, including natural dispersal by birds. Once within Europe, P. acuta's spread was likely facilitated by man-made canals and water birds.

The spread of P. acuta continues to be monitored and modelled in recent decades to inform efforts in its population control. While pesticides can affect non-target organisms sharing P. acuta's habitat, predators of P. acuta can act as agents in biological control by decreasing the number of snails in the environment. Laboratory studies showed that water bugs (Diplonychus rusticus) and glossiphoniid leeches prefer preying on P. acuta even in the presence of other prey snails, although studies in natural environments are pending as of 2023. The black carp can consume over 250 snails per day under laboratory conditions, including individuals buried in the substrate. However, as of 2001, potential risks associated with introducing the fish, including pathogen transmission and unintended population growth, still need to be assessed.

== Behaviour and ecology ==
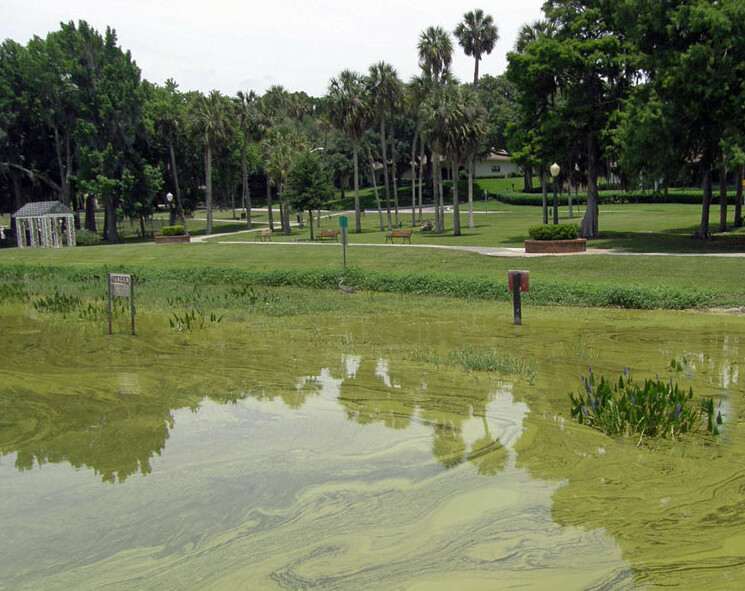
Physella acuta can survive in eutrophic habitats such as lakes with excess algal growth.

P. acuta can occupy a variety of freshwater habitats as well as habitats varying widely in water availability. As a pulmonate snail, it tolerates harsh environmental conditions such as polluted and eutrophic (oxygen-deprived) waters, since it is able to come to the surface to breathe air. P. acuta has been reported in lakes, ponds, streams, and ditches, as well as artificial sites such as reservoirs, sewage drains, and irrigation systems. It is a scraper feeder and uses its radula (a tongue-like structure covered in small chitinous teeth) to scrape green algae, diatoms, and aquatic plants from the surface.

P. acuta is a simultaneous hermaphrodite which is self-compatible, meaning it is capable of both outcrossing (reproduction with another individual) and self-fertilisation. In natural populations, reproduction occurs mainly by outcrossing, but self-fertilisation rates still remain between 10 and 30 percent and can increase as an adaptation strategy when mates are scarce. During P. acuta's reproductive development, snails first reach outcrossing maturity after about 5–7 weeks, while self-fertilisation maturity comes at around 14 weeks. Sexually mature adults breed year-round and lay 50–100 eggs per week. Eggs are deposited in elongate gelatinous sacs, which they attach to rock, compacted mud, or the shells of other P. acuta. Eggs hatch after 15–20 days. Under laboratory conditions, individuals live to about 22–30 weeks, although Núñez reported a lifespan of 88 weeks in 2010.

Due to its abundance, high reproductive rate, short generation time, and ease of laboratory cultivation, P. acuta is widely studied as a model organism (a species used to draw conclusions about broader organism groups). Its ecological role as a grazer and as prey makes it suitable for ecotoxicological studies, which investigate the impacts of pollutants on the environment. P. acuta has been used to assess pesticide toxicity across life stages, multigenerational effects of pharmaceutical pollutants, as well as the toxicity of microplastics, fluoride, and turbidity on gastropod behaviour and reproduction.

=== Ecological interactions ===
==== Coexistence and competition ====
P. acuta can coexist with other non-native snails such as Stenophysa marmorata, Potamopyrgus antipodarum, Lithoglyphus naticoides, and Radix auricularia. In these cases, competition may not be strong enough to cause exclusion, and species can differ in their competition strategies or life-history traits. More often, however, its presence leads to the decline of native gastropod populations in a very short period of time. In Mozambique, it displaced Bulinus forskalii to become the dominant gastropod in less than 50 years. It also outcompetes Glyptophysa gibbosa in Australia, Physa fontinalis in Italy, as well as Racesina luteola and Filopaludina bengalensis in India. Like many invasive freshwater snails, the competitive success of P. acuta can be explained by its higher fecundity, shorter egg development time, and broader tolerance to habitat degradation. It also shows a stronger growth response under rising temperatures than some native species, a trait that can favour it under climate change. These characteristics make P. acuta more efficient in competing for food when diets overlap. The presence of P. acuta can also inhibit the growth of other species, while its own growth is stimulated by them, although exact mechanisms are unknown.

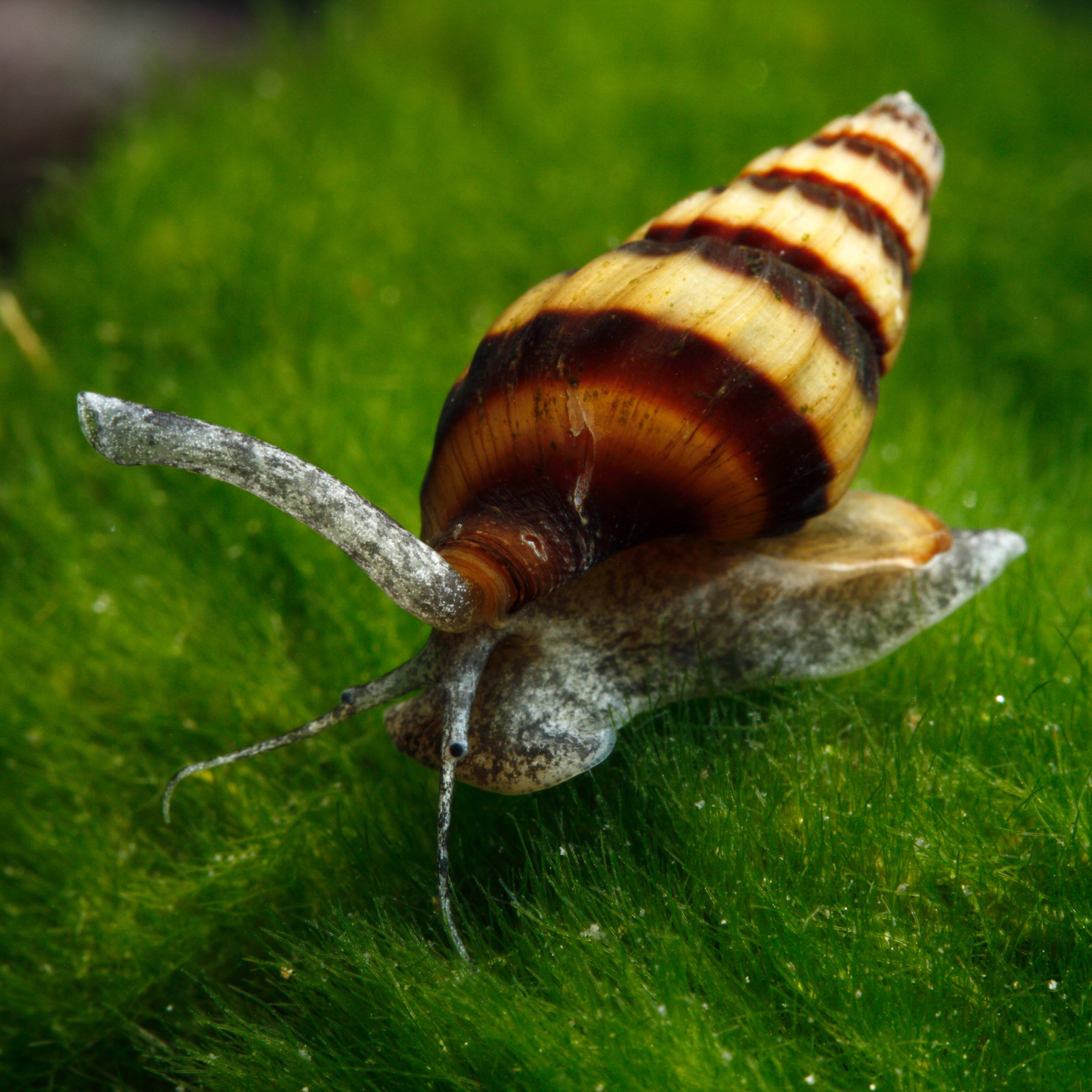
Anentome helena is often kept in aquariums to control populations of smaller snail species such as Physella acuta.

==== Predation ====
P. acuta is predated by a variety of animals, including water bugs, marsh fly larvae, crayfish, leeches, and various fish species. To a lesser degree, it is also prey to the carnivorous snail Anentome helena. Anti-predator behaviours include shell-shaking (rapid shell movements) and crawling to or above the waterline, as well as burrowing into the sediment, leaping (shell-shaking combined with detachment from the surface, causing the snail to jerk away), clamping to the substrate, and detaching to float up to the surface. Naranjo-García and Appleton suggested in 2009 that P. acuta's shell-shaking behaviour may contribute to its invasive success, as it reduces predation risk from slow-moving snail predators.

==== Parasitism ====
P. acuta is a potential intermediate host for parasites of both native wildlife and humans. Due to its cosmopolitan distribution and invasive capacity, it has the potential to significantly influence the distribution of parasites within freshwater ecosystems. Reported infections include turtle parasites within the genus Krefftascaris and the family Spirorchiidae, the bird parasite Cotylurus cornutus, and the rat parasite Euparyphium albuferensis, although infection prevalence within invasive P. acuta populations is often low. Experiments exposing P. acuta to the human parasites Hypoderaeum conoideum and Trichobilharzia regenti yielded no successful infections. This is consistent with the enemy release hypothesis, the observation that non-native species carry fewer parasites outside their native range. As of 2024 there has been only one documented link between P. acuta and human illness, when Moreira and colleagues recorded Echinostoma (a parasitic flatworm which causes echinostomiasis in humans upon infecting the gastrointestinal tract) in P. acuta from public parks in Rio de Janeiro, Brazil.

== Relationship with humans ==
P. acuta is often called a "nuisance snail" in freshwater fishkeeping. It is usually introduced inadvertently with ornamental plants or decoration, and a single introduced individual can be enough to establish a population. According to hobbyist magazines Practical Fishkeeping and Tropical Fish Hobbyist, an excessive reproduction of P. acuta may result from an oversupply of food in the aquarium, for example when fish and shrimp are overfed. However, Practical Fishkeeping also notes that a controlled population of P. acuta in an aquarium can help clean up organic leftovers and control algae growth. Their diet consists of algae and organic detritus and, while they may scrape softer aquarium plants, possible damage is limited by their size.
