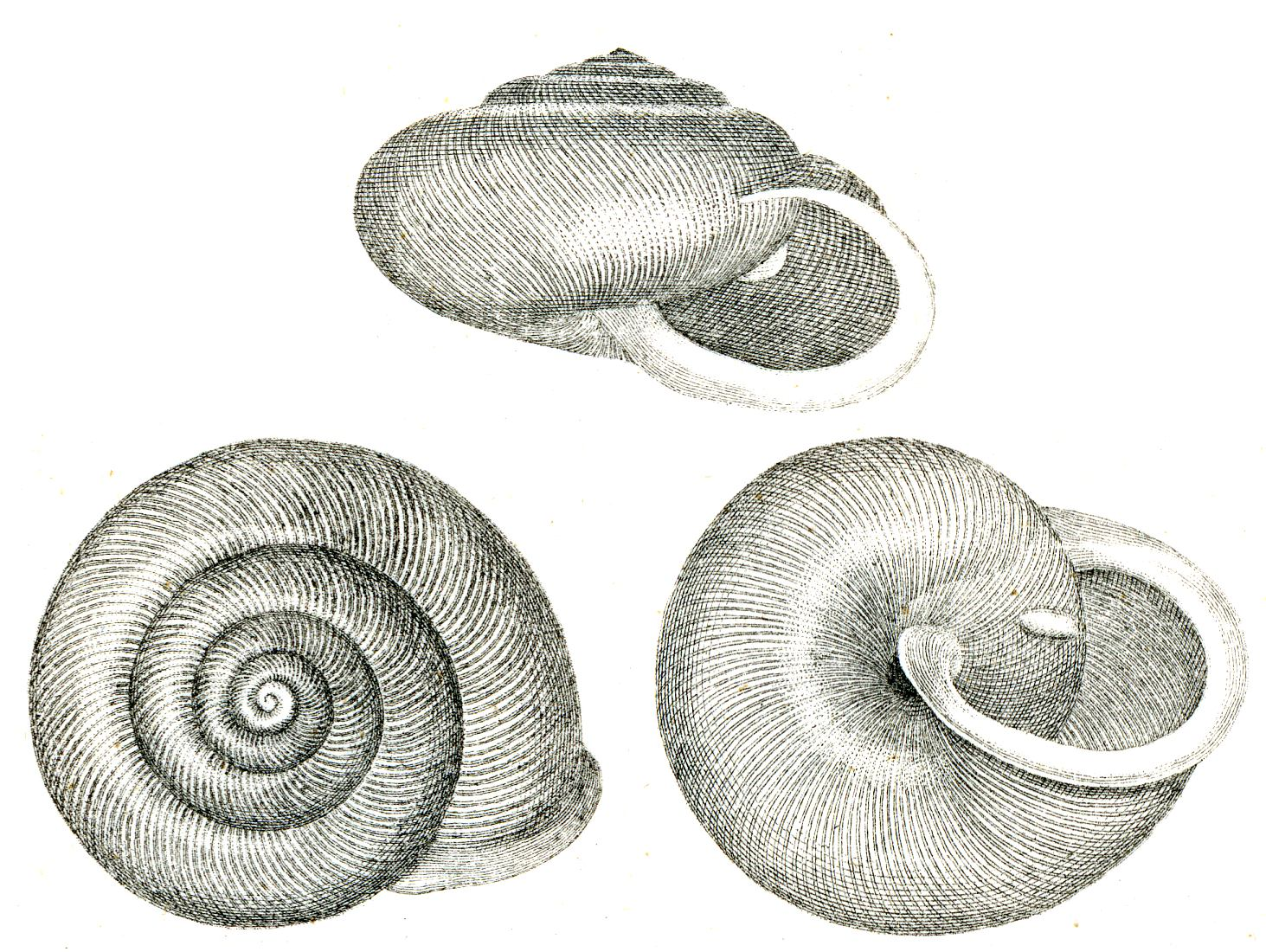
- Three views of a shell of Mesodon thyroidus from W. G. Binney, 1878

Scientific classification
- Domain: Eukaryota
- Kingdom: Animalia
- Phylum: Mollusca
- Class: Gastropoda
- Order: Stylommatophora
- Family: Polygyridae
- Genus: Mesodon; Rafinesque, 1821

= Mesodon =

Genus of gastropods

Mesodon is a genus of land snails in the family Polygyridae.

== Species ==
Species within the genus Mesodon include:

- Mesodon altivagus (Pilsbry, 1900) – wandering globe
- Mesodon andrewsae Binney, 1879 – balsam globe
- Mesodon clausus (Say, 1821) – yellow globelet
- Mesodon elevatus (Say, 1821) – proud globe
- Mesodon mitchellianus (I. Lea, 1839) – sealed globelet
- Mesodon normalis (Pilsbry, 1900) – grand globe
- Mesodon sanus (Clench & Archer, 1933) – squat globelet
- Mesodon thyroidus (Say, 1816) – white-lip globe
- Mesodon trossulus Hubricht, 1966 – dandy globelet
- Mesodon zaletus (Binney, 1837) – toothed globe

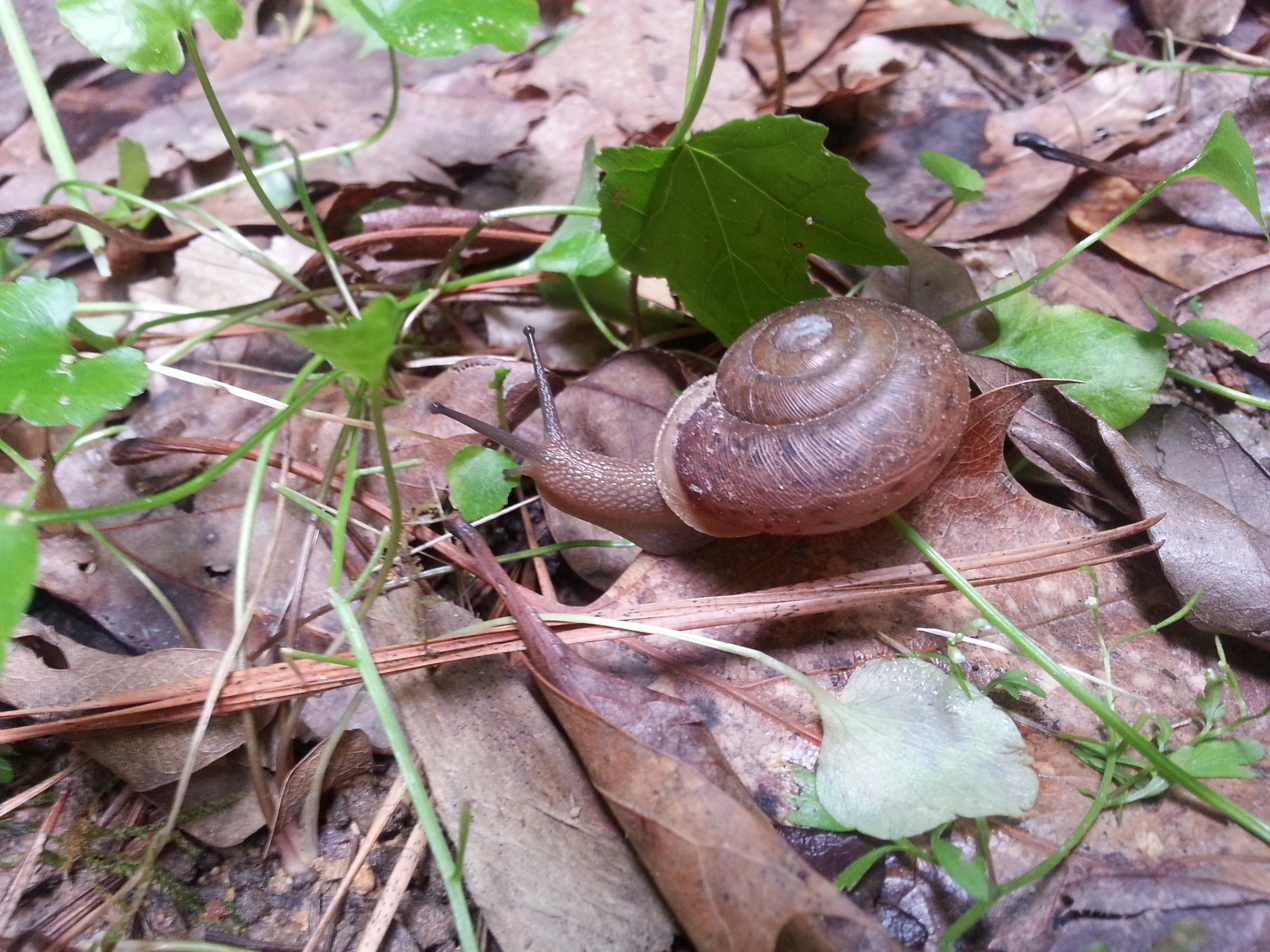
Mesodon snail in North Carolina, USA

=== Formerly placed here ===
- Fumonelix archeri – Archer's toothed land snail (as Mesodon archeri)
- Fumonelix jonesiana – Jones' middle-toothed land snail (as Mesodon jonesianus)
- Patera clenchi – Clench's middle-toothed land snail, Mission Creek Oregonian (as Mesodon clenchi)
