= L. plicata =

L. plicata may refer to:

- Laciniaria plicata, an air-breathing land snail species
- Leptoxis plicata, the plicate rocksnail, a freshwater snail species endemic to the United States

== See also ==
- Plicata (disambiguation)
