= Crassispira abundans =

Scientific classification
- Kingdom: Animalia
- Phylum: Mollusca
- Class: Gastropoda
- Subclass: Caenogastropoda
- Order: Neogastropoda
- Superfamily: Conoidea
- Family: Pseudomelatomidae
- Genus: Crassispira
- Species: C. abundans

Binomial name
- Crassispira abundans (Conrad 1840)

Synonyms
- † Drillia abundans Conrad 1840

Extinct species of gastropod

Crassispira abundans is an extinct species of sea snail, a marine gastropod mollusk in the family Pseudomelatomidae, the turrids and allies.

== Distribution ==
Fossils have been found in Oligocene strata in Mississippi, United States: age range: 33.9 to 28.4 Ma
