= Parastarte triquetra =

Scientific classification
- Kingdom: Animalia
- Phylum: Mollusca
- Class: Bivalvia
- Order: Venerida
- Superfamily: Veneroidea
- Family: Veneridae
- Genus: Parastarte
- Species: P. triquetra

Binomial name
- Parastarte triquetra (Conrad, 1846)

Species of bivalve

Parastarte triquetra, or the brown gem clam, is a species of bivalve mollusc in the family Veneridae. It is found along the Atlantic coast of North America, from Florida to the West Indies.
