= Parastarte =

Scientific classification
- Domain: Eukaryota
- Kingdom: Animalia
- Phylum: Mollusca
- Class: Bivalvia
- Order: Venerida
- Superfamily: Veneroidea
- Family: Veneridae
- Genus: Parastarte; Conrad, 1862

Species
- See text.

Genus of bivalves

Parastarte is a genus of molluscs in the family Veneridae.

== Species ==
- Parastarte triquetra (Conrad, 1846) – brown gem clam
