= Lithasia =

Scientific classification
- Kingdom: Animalia
- Phylum: Mollusca
- Class: Gastropoda
- Subclass: Caenogastropoda
- Order: incertae sedis
- Superfamily: Cerithioidea
- Family: Pleuroceridae
- Genus: Lithasia; Haldeman, 1840

Genus of gastropods

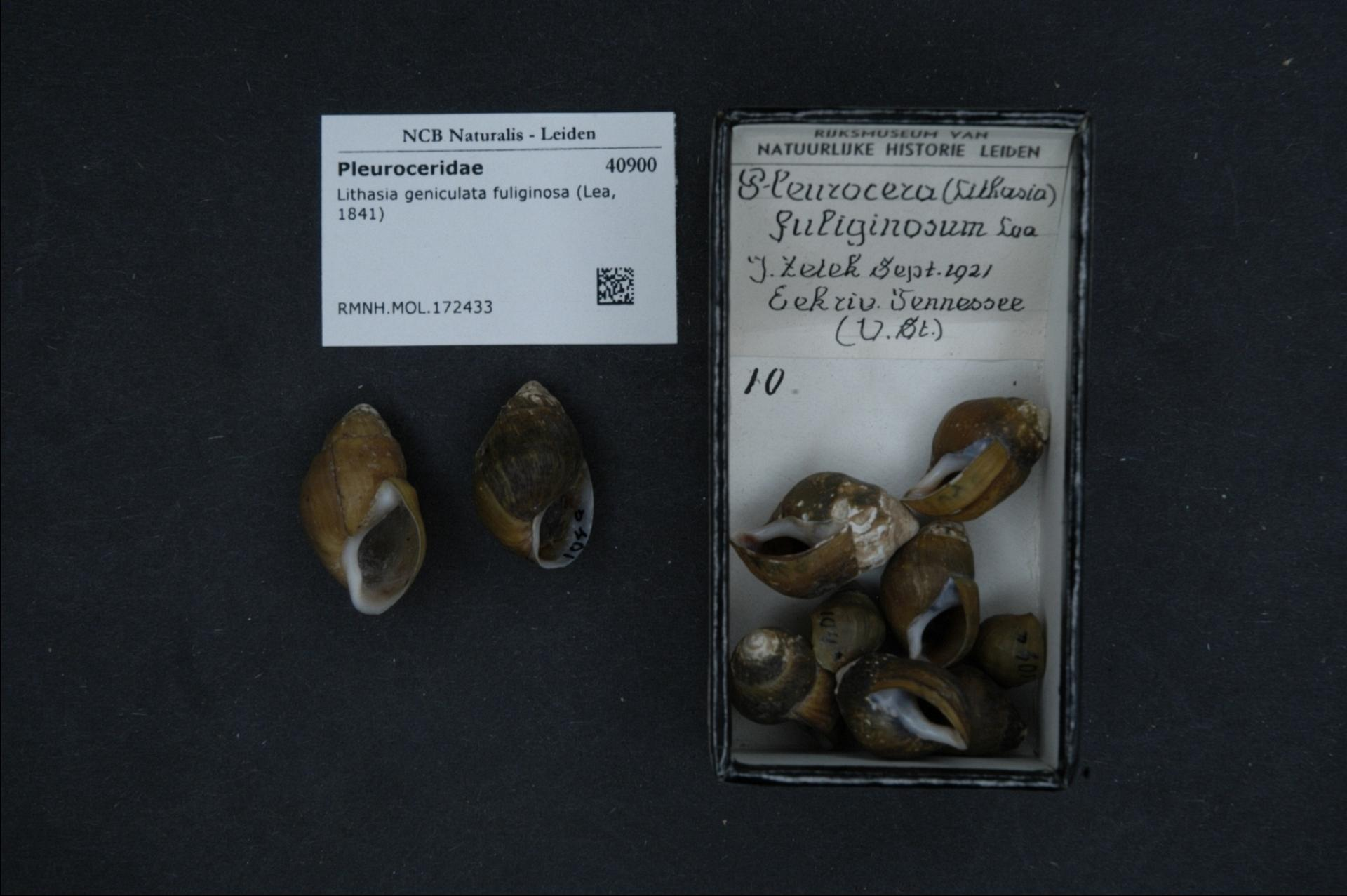
Example of Lithasia

Lithasia is a genus of medium-sized freshwater snails, aquatic gilled gastropod molluscs in the family Pleuroceridae. This genus is endemic to rivers in the mid-southern United States.

== Species ==
Species within the genus Lithasia include:

- Armigerous river snail (Lithasia armigera)
- Knobby rocksnail (Lithasia curta)
- Dutton's river snail (Lithasia duttoniana)
- Geniculate river snail (Lithasia geniculata)
- Jay's river snail (Lithasia jayana)
- Elk River file snail (Lithasia lima)
- Muddy rocksnail (Lithasia salebrosa)
- Varicose rocksnail (Lithasia verrucosa)
