= Elk River file snail =

Conservation status
- Data Deficient (IUCN 3.1)

- Imperiled (NatureServe)

Scientific classification
- Kingdom: Animalia
- Phylum: Mollusca
- Class: Gastropoda
- Subclass: Caenogastropoda
- Order: incertae sedis
- Family: Pleuroceridae
- Genus: Lithasia
- Species: L. lima

Binomial name
- Lithasia lima (Conrad, 1834)

Synonyms
- Angitrema wheatleyi Tryon, 1866; Melania lima Conrad, 1834

Species of gastropod

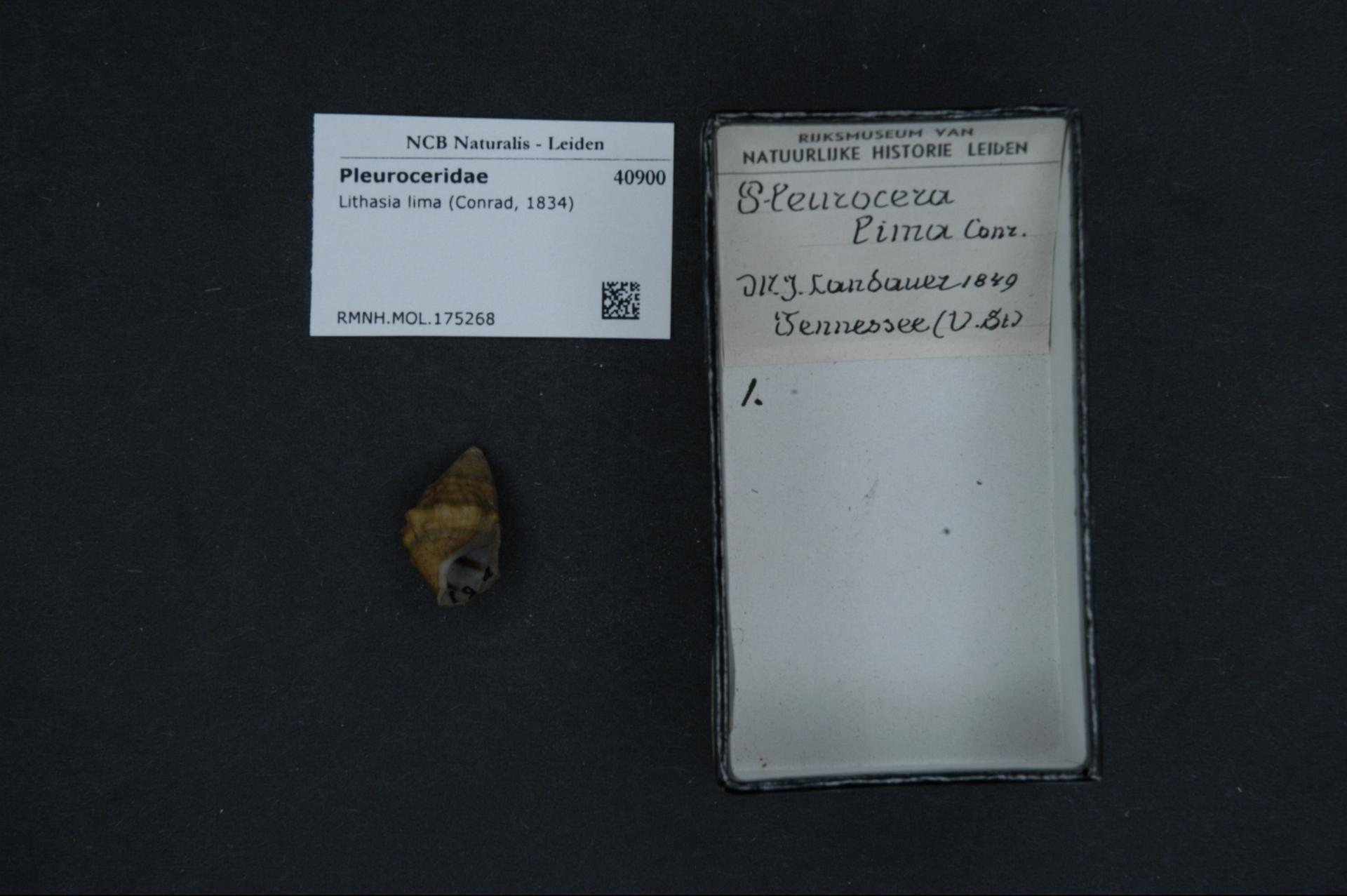

The Elk River file snail also known as the warty rocksnail, scientific name Lithasia lima, is a species of freshwater snail with an operculum, an aquatic gastropod mollusk in the family Pleuroceridae. This species is endemic to the United States.
