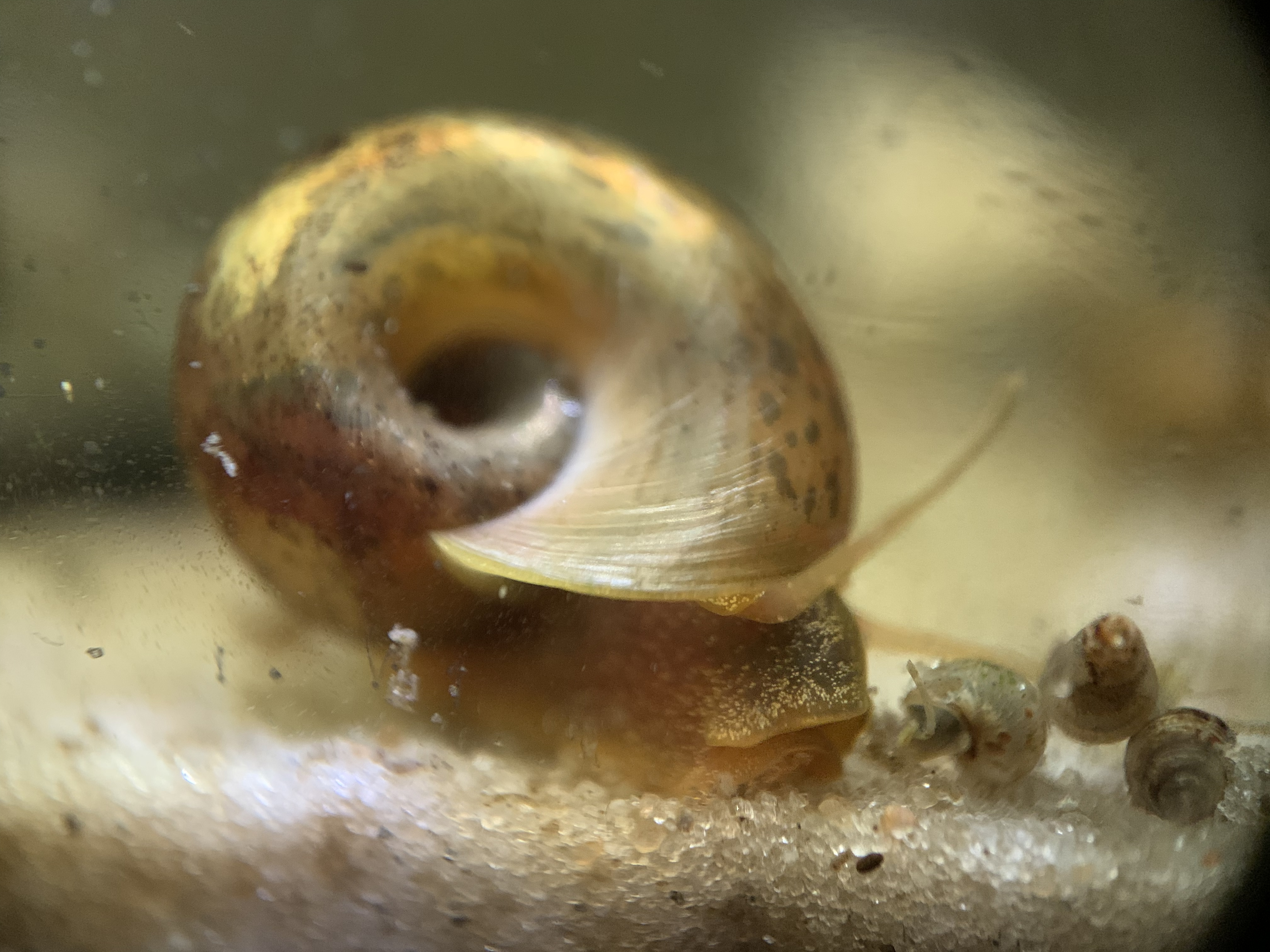
- A live Planorbella duryi individual

Conservation status
- Secure (NatureServe)

Scientific classification
- Kingdom: Animalia
- Phylum: Mollusca
- Class: Gastropoda
- Superorder: Hygrophila
- Family: Planorbidae
- Genus: Planorbella
- Species: P. duryi

Binomial name
- Planorbella duryi (Wetherby, 1879)

Synonyms
- Planorbis (Helisoma) duryi Wetherby, 1879; Helisoma duryi (Wetherby, 1879)

= Planorbella duryi =

Planorbella duryi Temporal range: Piacenzian - recent

Species of gastropod

Planorbella duryi, common name the Seminole rams-horn, is a species of air-breathing freshwater snail, a pulmonate gastropod mollusk in the family Planorbidae, the ram's horn snails. The species is endemic to Florida and is found frequently in home aquariums.

== Description ==
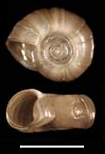
Apical and apertural view of a shell of Planorbella duryi. Scale bar is 10 mm.

In the wild they are brown. In captivity they have been bred to come in many colours. These colours are:

- Brown
- Brown leopard
- Blue
- Blue leopard
- Red/orange
- Pink
- Green
- Purple

== Distribution ==
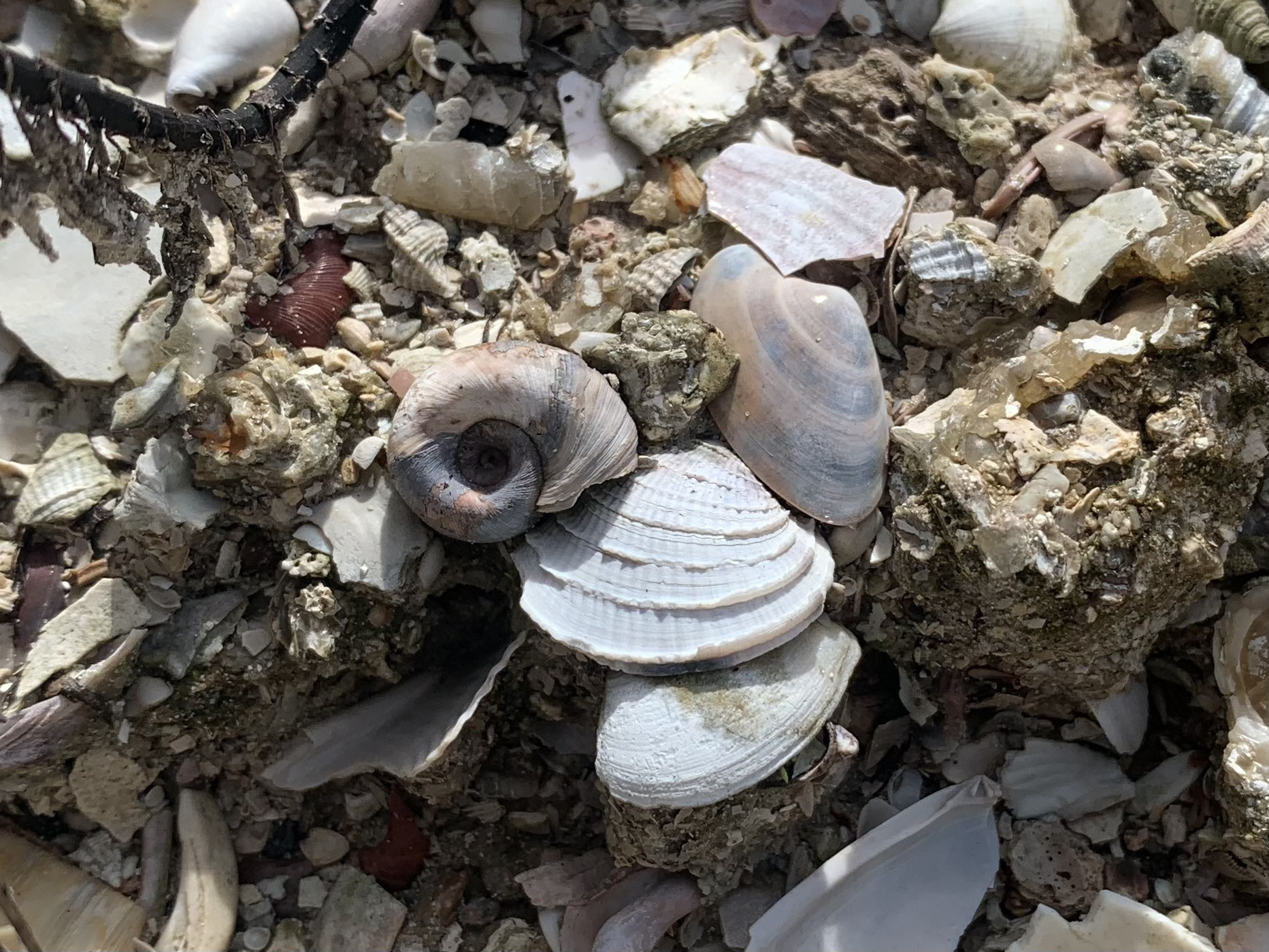
Fossilized Planorbella duryi eroding out of the Tamiami formation, in Florida

This species of snail is endemic to the freshwater ecosystems of the US state of Florida. Fossils of the species have been found dating back to the Piacenzian, in the Tamiami formation.

It has been introduced to Hawaii and lives in the wild there. It is an introduced species in various European islands and countries including:

- Great Britain as a "hothouse alien"
- Hungary
- Ireland as a "hothouse alien"
- Parts of Southern Nigeria [e.g Ogun State, Lagos, Oyo]
- Palestine, first discovered in the pond at the Palestine Museum of Natural History
- Poland
- A live population was found in a brook with thermal water flowing from the Sliač spa, Slovakia, in 2023.

== Habitat ==
They are found in most freshwater habitats including streams and ponds.

== Conservation status ==
This species is listed by natureserve as G5.

== Diet ==
They eat dead or decaying plants or fish, and algae.

== Breeding ==
They are hermaphrodites. They lay eggs and are very fast breeders. The eggs are spawned in a transparent gelatinous mass and usually hatch in three weeks.

== Human use ==
They are a very common aquarium snail. Eggs can get into aquariums on plants. Some people consider them pests due to their ability to breed very fast and overpopulate. Other people value them as part of their clean up crew.
