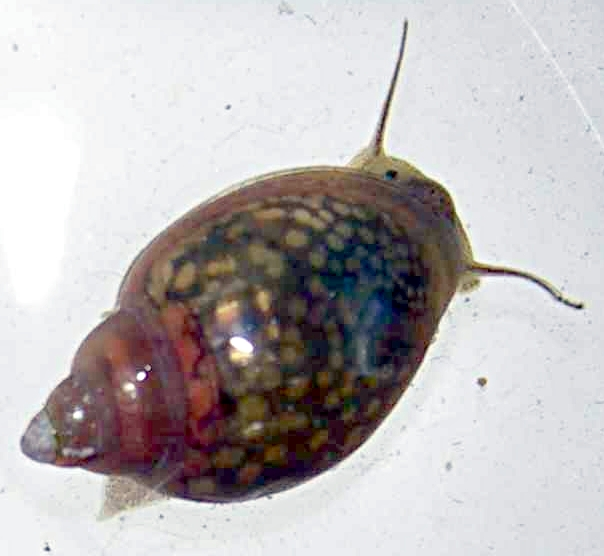
- A live individual of Physella acuta

Scientific classification
- Kingdom: Animalia
- Phylum: Mollusca
- Class: Gastropoda
- Superorder: Hygrophila
- Family: Physidae
- Tribe: Physellini
- Genus: Physella; Haldeman, 1842

= Physella =

Genus of gastropods

Physella is a genus of small, left-handed or sinistral, air-breathing freshwater snails, aquatic pulmonate gastropod mollusks in the family Physidae.

These snails eat algae, diatoms and other detritus.

== Shell description ==
Snails in the family Physidae have shells that are sinistral, which means that if the shell is held with the spire pointing up and the aperture facing the observer, the aperture is on the left-hand side.

The shells of Physella species have a long and large aperture, a pointed spire, and no operculum. The shells are thin and corneous and rather transparent.

== Species ==
Species in the genus include:

- Physella acuta (Draparnaud, 1805) - Pewter Physa, type species, synonyms: Physella heterostropha (Say, 1817), Physella integra (Haldeman, 1841)
- Physella ancillaria (Say, 1825)
- Physella bermudezi (Aguayo, 1935) - Lowdome Physa
- Physella bottimeri (Clench, 1924) - Comanche Physa
- Physella boucardi (Crosse & P. Fischer, 1881) - Desert Physa
- Physella columbiana (Hemphill, 1890) - Rotund Physa
- Physella conoidea (P. Fischer & Crosse, 1886) - Texas Physa
- Physella cooperi (Tryon, 1865) - Olive Physa
- Physella costata (Newcomb, 1861) - Ornate Physa
- Physella cubensis (Pfeiffer, 1839)
- Physella globosa (Haldeman, 1841) - Globose Physa
- Physella gyrina (Say, 1821)
- Physella hendersoni (Clench, 1925)
- Physella hordacea (I. Lea, 1864) - Grain Physa
- Physella humerosa (Gould, 1855) - Corkscrew Physa
- Physella johnsoni (Clench, 1926) - Banff Springs Snail
- Physella lordi (Baird, 1863) - Twisted Physa
- Physella magnalacustris (Walker, 1901)
- Physella mexicana (Philippi, 1841) - Polished Physa
- Physella microstriata (Chamberlin & E. G. Berry, 1930)
- Physella natricina Taylor, 1988
- Physella osculans (Haldeman, 1841) - Cayuse Physa
- Physella parkeri (Currier, 1881) - Broadshoulder Physa
- Physella propinqua (Tryon, 1865) - Rocky Mountain Physa
- Physella sayi
- Physella spelunca (Turner & Clench, 1974)
- Physella squalida (Morelet, 1851) - Squalid Physa
- Physella traski (I. Lea, 1864) - Sculpted Physa
- Physella utahensis (Clench, 1925)
- Physella vinosa (Gould, 1847) - Banded Physa
- Physella virgata (Gould, 1855)
- Physella virginea (Gould, 1847) - Sunset Physa
- Physella winnipegensis ..., 2004
- Physella wrighti Te & Clarke, 1985
- Physella zionis (Pilsbry, 1926)

== See also ==
- Physa
