= Muddy rocksnail =

Conservation status
- Vulnerable (IUCN 2.3)

- Imperiled (NatureServe)

Scientific classification
- Kingdom: Animalia
- Phylum: Mollusca
- Class: Gastropoda
- Subclass: Caenogastropoda
- Order: incertae sedis
- Family: Pleuroceridae
- Genus: Lithasia
- Species: L. salebrosa

Binomial name
- Lithasia salebrosa (Conrad, 1834)

Synonyms
- Melania salebrosa Conrad, 1834

Species of gastropod

The muddy rocksnail, also known as the rugged river snail, scientific name Lithasia salebrosa, is a species of freshwater snail with a gill and an operculum, an aquatic gastropod mollusk in the family Pleuroceridae. This species is endemic to the United States.
