= Inflectarius =

Scientific classification
- Domain: Eukaryota
- Kingdom: Animalia
- Phylum: Mollusca
- Class: Gastropoda
- Order: Stylommatophora
- Family: Polygyridae
- Subfamily: Triodopsinae
- Tribe: Mesodontini
- Genus: Inflectarius; Pilsbry, 1940

Genus of gastropods

Inflectarius is a genus of air-breathing land snails, terrestrial pulmonate gastropod molluscs in the family Polygyridae.

== Species ==
Species in the genus Inflectarius include:

- Inflectarius approximans (G. H. Clapp, 1905) – tight-gapped shagreen
- Inflectarius downieanus (Bland, 1861) – dwarf globelet
- Inflectarius edentatus (Sampson, 1889) – smooth-lip shagreen
- Inflectarius ferrissi (Pilsbry, 1897) – Smoky Mountain covert
- Inflectarius inflectus (Say, 1821) – shagreen
- Inflectarius kalmianus (Hubricht, 1965) – brown globelet
- Inflectarius magazinensis (Pilsbry & Ferriss, 1907) – Magazine Mountain middle-toothed snail
- Inflectarius rugeli (Shuttleworth, 1852) – deep-tooth shagreen
- Inflectarius smithi (G. H. Clapp, 1905) – Alabama shagreen
- Inflectarius subpalliatus (Pilsbry, 1893) – velvet covert
- Inflectarius verus (Hubricht, 1954)
