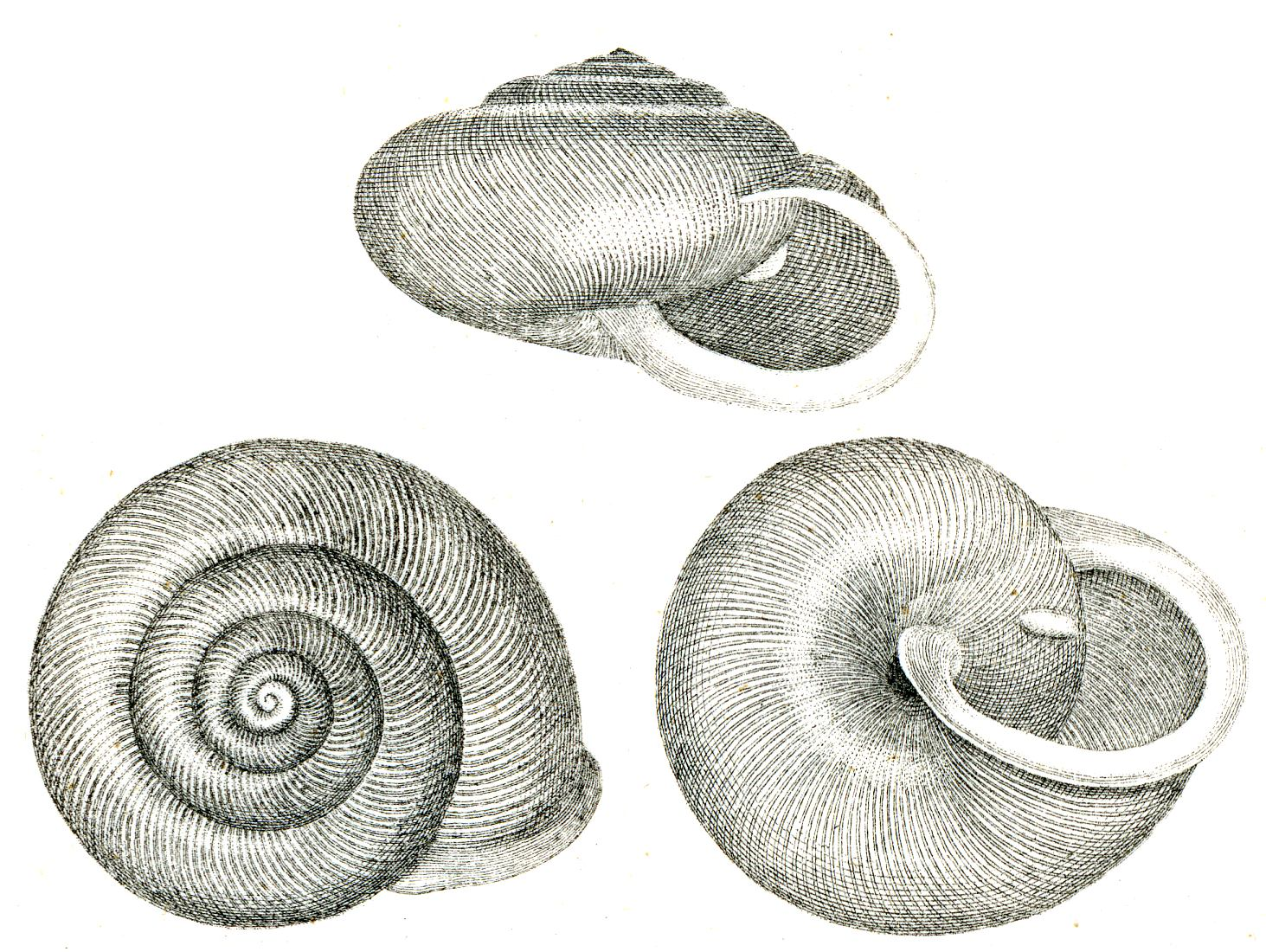
- Three views of a shell of Mesodon thyroidus from W. G. Binney, 1878

Conservation status
- Secure (NatureServe)

Scientific classification
- Kingdom: Animalia
- Phylum: Mollusca
- Class: Gastropoda
- Order: Stylommatophora
- Family: Polygyridae
- Genus: Mesodon
- Species: M. thyroidus

Binomial name
- Mesodon thyroidus ((Say, 1816)

= Mesodon thyroidus =

Species of gastropod

Mesodon thyroidus, common name White-lip Globe Snail is a species of air-breathing land snail, a terrestrial gastropod mollusk in the family Polygyridae.

== Ecology ==
This snail is found at lower elevations near river floodplains, wetlands and limestone. It primarily eats fungi

== Distribution ==
This snail is commonly found in the Midwest and Southeast United States. It is found in most counties in Virginia, where it is native

== Parasites ==
Parasites of Mesodon thyroidus include:

- The nematode Parelaphostrongylus tenuis
