= Fumonelix =

Scientific classification
- Kingdom: Animalia
- Phylum: Mollusca
- Class: Gastropoda
- Order: Stylommatophora
- Family: Polygyridae
- Genus: Fumonelix; Emberton, 1991

Genus of gastropods

Fumonelix is a genus of small, air-breathing, land snails, terrestrial pulmonate gastropod molluscs in the family Polygyridae.

== Species ==
Species in the genus Fumonelix include:

- Fumonelix archeri – Ocoee covert, Archer's toothed land snail
- Fumonelix cherohalaensis
- Fumonelix christyi – glossy covert
- Fumonelix jonesiana – big-tooth covert, Jones' middle-toothed land snail
- Fumonelix langdoni
- Fumonelix orestes – engraved covert
- Fumonelix roanensis
- Fumonelix wetherbyi – clifty covert
- Fumonelix wheatleyi – cinnamon covert
