= Fumonelix christyi =

Conservation status
- Vulnerable (NatureServe)

Scientific classification
- Kingdom: Animalia
- Phylum: Mollusca
- Class: Gastropoda
- Order: Stylommatophora
- Family: Polygyridae
- Genus: Fumonelix
- Species: F. christyi

Binomial name
- Fumonelix christyi (Bland, 1860)

Synonyms
- Helix christyi Bland, 1860; Mesodon christyi (Bland, 1860)

Species of land snail

Fumonelix christyi, commonly known as the glossy covert, is a species of land snail in the family Polygyridae. It is native to the United States.
