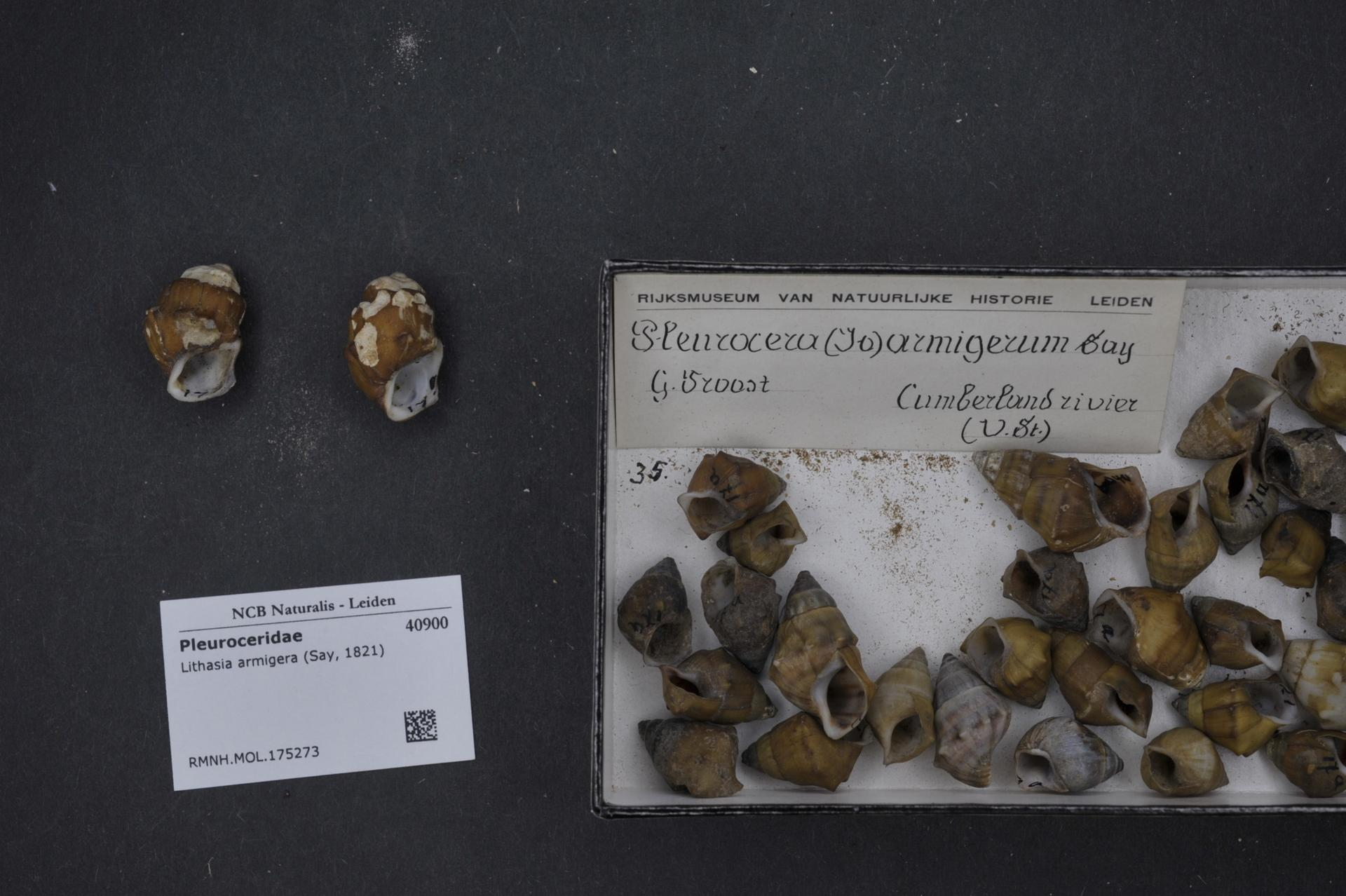

Conservation status
- Vulnerable (IUCN 2.3)

- Vulnerable (NatureServe)

Scientific classification
- Kingdom: Animalia
- Phylum: Mollusca
- Class: Gastropoda
- Subclass: Caenogastropoda
- Order: incertae sedis
- Family: Pleuroceridae
- Genus: Lithasia
- Species: L. armigera

Binomial name
- Lithasia armigera (Say, 1821)

Synonyms
- Angitrema angulata Wetherby, 1876; Angitrema armigera (Say, 1821); Angitrema parva Wetherby, 1876; Lithasia downiei Lea, 1862; Melania armigera Say, 1821; Melania nodata Reeve, 1861; Melania pallidula Anthony, 1854; Melania spixiana Lea, 1838; Melania stygia Say, 1829; Melania tuberculata Lea, 1831; Meseschiza grosvenorii Lea, 1864

= Armigerous river snail =

Species of gastropod

The armigerous river snail or armored rocksnail, scientific name Lithasia armigera, is a species of freshwater snail with an operculum, an aquatic gastropod mollusk in the family Pleuroceridae. This species is endemic to the United States.
