= Marstonia pachyta =

Armored Marstonia

Conservation status
- Data Deficient (IUCN 3.1)

- Critically Imperiled (NatureServe)

Scientific classification
- Kingdom: Animalia
- Phylum: Mollusca
- Class: Gastropoda
- Subclass: Caenogastropoda
- Order: Littorinimorpha
- Family: Hydrobiidae
- Genus: Marstonia
- Species: M. pachyta

Binomial name
- Marstonia pachyta F. G. Thompson, 1977

Synonyms
- Pyrgulopsis pachyta (F. G. Thompson, 1977)

Species of gastropod

The armored marstonia, scientific name Marstonia pachyta, also known as Pyrgulopsis pachyta, is a species of freshwater snail, an aquatic gastropod mollusc in the family Hydrobiidae.

This species is endemic to Alabama, in the United States, where it is found in only two creeks, both in Limestone County. Its two locations are separated by the man-made Wheeler Lake. It is threatened by habitat loss.
