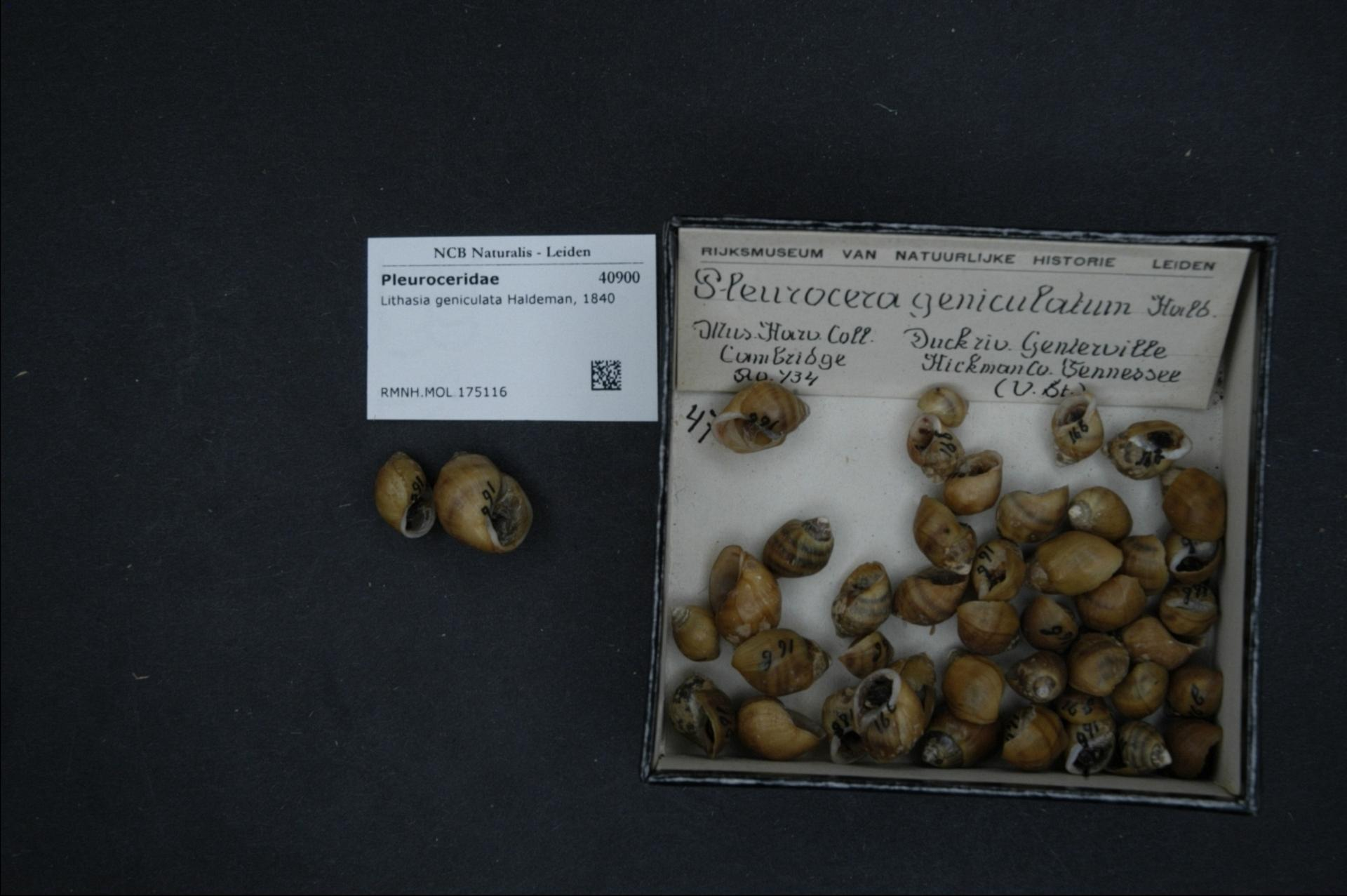

Conservation status
- Near Threatened (IUCN 2.3)

- Vulnerable (NatureServe)

Scientific classification
- Kingdom: Animalia
- Phylum: Mollusca
- Class: Gastropoda
- Subclass: Caenogastropoda
- Order: incertae sedis
- Family: Pleuroceridae
- Genus: Lithasia
- Species: L. geniculata

Binomial name
- Lithasia geniculata (Haldeman, 1840)

Synonyms
- Anculosa (Lithasia) geniculata Haldeman, 1840; Anculosa geniculata Haldeman, 1840; Goniobasis umbonata Lea, 1864; Melania corneola Anthony, 1860; Melania venusta Lea, 1841; Melania vesicula Lea, 1861

= Geniculate river snail =

Species of gastropod

The geniculate river snail or ornate rocksnail, scientific name Lithasia geniculata, is a species of freshwater snails with an operculum, aquatic gastropod mollusks in the family Pleuroceridae. This species is endemic to the United States.
