= Physella parkeri =

Conservation status
- Imperiled (NatureServe)

Scientific classification
- Kingdom: Animalia
- Phylum: Mollusca
- Class: Gastropoda
- Superorder: Hygrophila
- Family: Physidae
- Genus: Physella
- Species: P. parkeri

Binomial name
- Physella parkeri (Currier, 1881)

Species of gastropod

Physella parkeri, the Broadshoulder Physa, is a species of small air-breathing freshwater snail.

It is an aquatic gastropod mollusk in the family Physidae.

Like others in the family, this species is sinistral or left-handed.

== Distribution ==
The subspecies Physella parkeri latchfordi, also known as the "Gatineau tadpole snail", lives in Quebec, Canada. It was categorized as "Data Deficient" (DD) by the Committee on the Status of Endangered Wildlife in Canada (COSEWIC).
