= Utah physa =

Conservation status
- Vulnerable (IUCN 2.3)

- Vulnerable (NatureServe)

Scientific classification
- Kingdom: Animalia
- Phylum: Mollusca
- Class: Gastropoda
- Superorder: Hygrophila
- Family: Physidae
- Genus: Physella
- Species: P. utahensis

Binomial name
- Physella utahensis (Clench, 1925)

Synonyms
- Physa gyrina utahensis; Physa utahensis

Species of gastropod

The Utah physa, scientific name Physella utahensis, is a species of freshwater snail, an aquatic gastropod mollusk in the family Physidae. The common name refers to the state of Utah.

This species is endemic to the United States and is known from Utah, Colorado, and Wyoming.
