= Lacy elimia =

Conservation status
- Vulnerable (IUCN 2.3)

- Critically Imperiled (NatureServe)

Scientific classification
- Kingdom: Animalia
- Phylum: Mollusca
- Class: Gastropoda
- Subclass: Caenogastropoda
- Order: incertae sedis
- Family: Pleuroceridae
- Genus: Elimia
- Species: E. crenatella

Binomial name
- Elimia crenatella I. Lea, 1860

Species of gastropod

The lacy elimia, also known as the lacey elimia, scientific name Elimia crenatella, is a species of freshwater snail with a gill and an operculum, an aquatic gastropod mollusk in the family Pleuroceridae.

This species is endemic to the United States, specifically the state of Alabama. The snail has been listed as threatened on the United States Fish and Wildlife Service list of endangered species since October 28, 1998.

== Description ==
The lacy elimia is a small species in the family Pleuroceridae. Growing to about 1.1 centimeters (cm) (0.4 in) in length, the shell is conic in shape, strongly striate, and often folded in the upper whorls.

The shell color is dark brown to black, often purple in the aperture, and without banding. The aperture is small and ovate. The lacy elimia is easily distinguished from other Elimia species by a combination of characters (i.e., size, ornamentation, color).

== Genetics ==
In a recent genetic sequence study of the 16S ribosomal RNA gene, the lacy elimia was found to be very similar to the compact elimia (Elimia showalteri). Despite their apparent close genetic relationship, the authors made no suggestion that the two species represented a single species. Upon review of Lydeard et al. (1997), Dillon suggested that additional genetic studies were needed to demonstrate the genetic uniqueness of the lacy elimia. However, the Lydeard et al. (1997) genetic study addressed only one small genetic character of the genome (entire genetic make-up of an individual) of these species, and other characters strongly support the taxonomic status of the lacy elimia.

The two species are allopatric (do not overlap in distribution - the compact elimia occurs in the Cahaba River, whereas the lacy elimia is found in the Coosa River drainage), and are strikingly different in size, appearance, and behavior. The compact elimia has a large, robust, smooth shell boldly colored brown and/or green, whereas the lacy elimia has a small, delicate, darkly colored, and ornamented shell.

The lacy elimia is one of the few elimia snails in the Basin that does not exhibit clinal variation. In addition, compact elimia are found grazing individually throughout shoal habitats, whereas the lacy elimia is usually found in tight clusters or colonies on larger rocks within a shoal. Allopatry, morphology, and behavior are strong characters supporting the species status of the lacy elimia.

== Distribution ==
The current distribution of lacy elimia is in 3 creeks in Talladega County, Alabama

The lacy elimia was historically abundant in the Coosa River main stem from St. Clair County, Alabama to Chilton County, Alabama, and was also known in several Coosa River tributaries: Big Will's Creek, DeKalb County; Kelley's Creek, St. Clair County; and Choccolocco Creek and Tallaseehatchee Creek, Talladega County, Alabama.

Currently, the lacy elimia is only known to survive in three Coosa River tributaries: Cheaha Creek, Emauhee Creek, and Weewoka Creek, Talladega County, Alabama. The species is locally abundant in the lower reaches of Cheaha Creek. This stream originates within the Talladega National Forest; however, no specimens of the lacy elimia have been collected on United States Forest Service lands. The species has also been found at single sites in Emauhee and Weewoka creeks, where specimens are rare, and difficult to locate.

All of these streams are variously impacted by sediments and nutrients from a variety of upstream rural, suburban, and/or urban sources. Because of their small sizes and limited flows, their water and habitat quality can be rapidly affected by local and off site pollution sources.

== Reasons for the decline ==
The lacy elimia has disappeared from more than 90 percent of its historic range. The curtailment of habitat and range for this (and few other snail species) species in the Mobile Basin's larger rivers (Coosa River for lacy elimia) is primarily due to extensive construction of dams, and the subsequent inundation of the snail's shoal habitats by the impounded waters. This snail has disappeared from all portions of its historic habitats that have been impounded by dams.

Dams change such areas by eliminating or reducing currents, and thus allowing sediments to accumulate on inundated channel habitats. Impounded waters also experience changes in water chemistry, which could affect survival or reproduction of riverine snails. For example, many reservoirs in the Basin currently experience eutrophic (enrichment of a water body with nutrients) conditions, and chronically low dissolved oxygen levels. Such physical and chemical changes can affect feeding, respiration, and reproduction of these riffle and shoal snail species.

== Ecology ==
Little is known of the ecology specific to the lacy elimia, however, common information about genus Elimia are as follows.

=== Habitat ===
Elimia snails are gill-breathing snails that typically inhabit highly oxygenated waters on rock shoals and gravel bars.

It is associated with river or stream habitats characterized by flowing currents, and hard, clean bottoms (e.g., bedrock, boulder, gravel).

=== Feeding habits ===
Most elimia species graze on periphyton (attached algae) growing on benthic (bottom) substrates.

=== Life cycle ===
Individual snails are either male or female. Eggs are laid in early spring and hatch in about 2 weeks. Snails apparently become sexually mature in their first year, but, in some cases, females may not lay eggs until their second year. Some elimia species may live as long as 5 years.
