= Cave physa =

Cave physa Physella spelunca,

Conservation status
- Vulnerable (IUCN 2.3)

- Critically Imperiled (NatureServe)

Scientific classification
- Kingdom: Animalia
- Phylum: Mollusca
- Class: Gastropoda
- Superorder: Hygrophila
- Family: Physidae
- Genus: Physella
- Species: P. spelunca

Binomial name
- Physella spelunca Turner & Clench, 1974

Species of gastropod

The cave physa (Physella spelunca) is a species of small, air-breathing, freshwater snail, an aquatic pulmonate gastropod mollusk in the family Physidae. It lives only in caves.

This species is endemic to Big Horn County, Wyoming.

== See also ==
- List of non-marine molluscs of the United States
