= Fish Lake physa =

Fish Lake physa Physella microstriata

Conservation status
- Extinct (IUCN 2.3)

Scientific classification
- Kingdom: Animalia
- Phylum: Mollusca
- Class: Gastropoda
- Superorder: Hygrophila
- Family: Physidae
- Genus: Physella
- Species: †P. microstriata

Binomial name
- †Physella microstriata (Chamberlain & E.G. Berry, 1930)

Species of gastropod

The Fish Lake physa, scientific name Physella microstriata, was a species of air-breathing freshwater snail, an aquatic gastropod mollusk in the family Physidae.

This species was endemic to the United States. It is now extinct.
