= Polygyriscus =

Conservation status
- Data Deficient (IUCN 2.3)

- Critically Imperiled (NatureServe)
- Endangered (ESA)

Scientific classification
- Kingdom: Animalia
- Phylum: Mollusca
- Class: Gastropoda
- Order: Stylommatophora
- Family: Helicodiscidae
- Subfamily: Helicodiscinae
- Genus: Polygyriscus; Pilsbry, 1948
- Species: P. virginianus

Binomial name
- Polygyriscus virginianus (P. R. Burch, 1947)

Genus of gastropods

Polygyriscus is a genus of minute air-breathing land snails, terrestrial pulmonate gastropod molluscs in the family Helicodiscidae. This is a monotypic genus of snails containing the single species Polygyriscus virginianus, known commonly as the Virginia fringed mountain snail or the Virginia coil. That species is endemic to the State of Virginia in the United States.

The Virginia coil was listed as federally endangered species on 2 August 1978.

This snail was described in 1947. It is very rare; the snail has only been seen on bluffs along the New River in Pulaski County, Virginia. Only four adult specimens have been observed since 1978, and no juveniles have been seen since 1971. The snail is, however, difficult to find because it is only 3/20 in. long and may burrow up to 6 feet into the soil.
