= Slender campeloma =

Conservation status
- Vulnerable (IUCN 2.3)

- Critically Imperiled (NatureServe)

Scientific classification
- Kingdom: Animalia
- Phylum: Mollusca
- Class: Gastropoda
- Subclass: Caenogastropoda
- Order: Architaenioglossa
- Family: Viviparidae
- Genus: Campeloma
- Species: C. decampi

Binomial name
- Campeloma decampi (W. G. Binney, 1865)

Synonyms
- Melantho decampi Binney, 1865 (original combination)

Species of gastropod

The slender campeloma, scientific name Campeloma decampi, is a species of freshwater snail with an operculum, an aquatic gastropod mollusc in the family Viviparidae.

This species is endemic to Alabama in the United States, where it is known only from Limestone County.

This snail is a federally listed endangered species of the United States.
