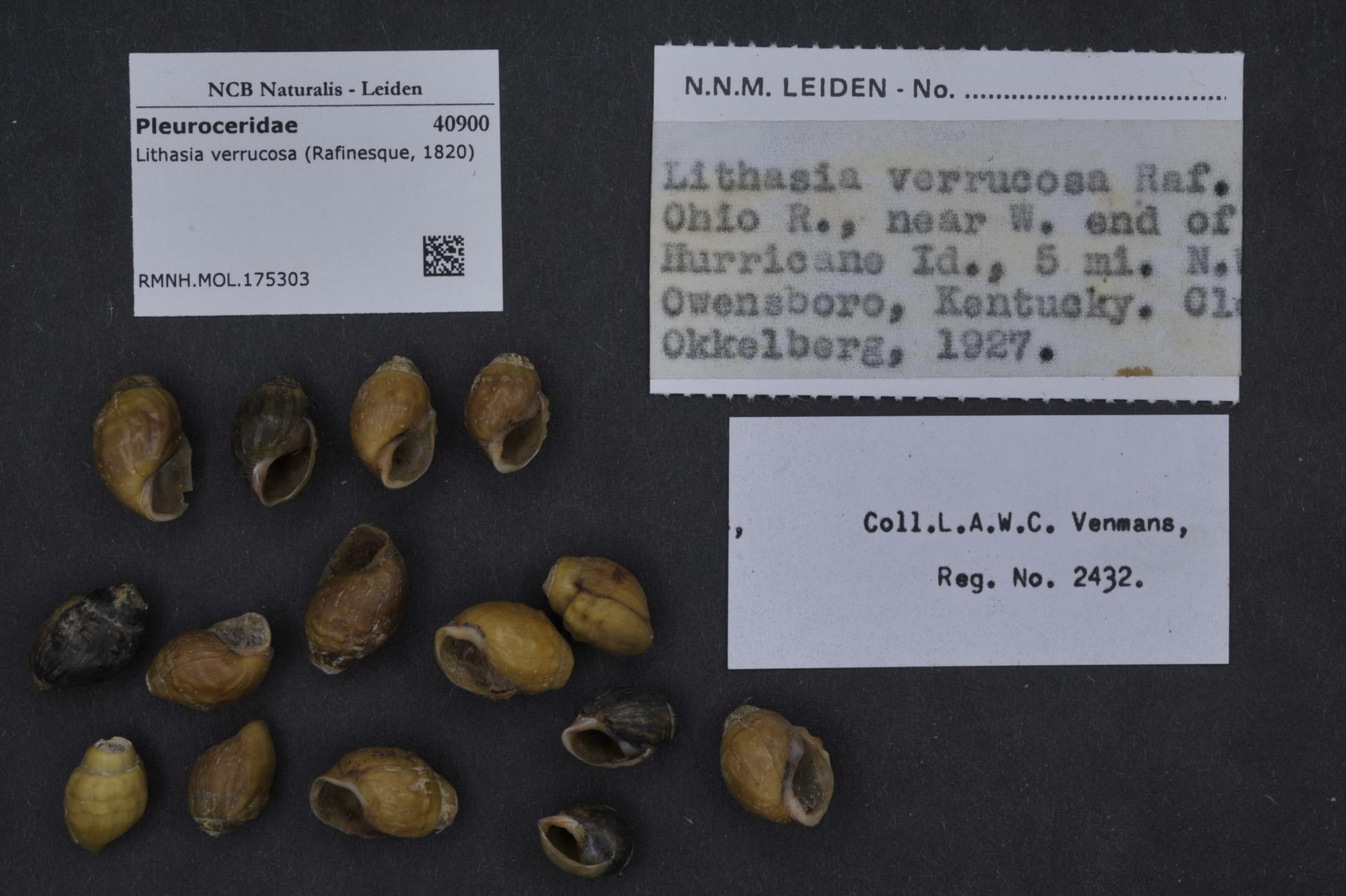

Conservation status
- Least Concern (IUCN 3.1)

- Apparently Secure (NatureServe)

Scientific classification
- Kingdom: Animalia
- Phylum: Mollusca
- Class: Gastropoda
- Subclass: Caenogastropoda
- Order: incertae sedis
- Family: Pleuroceridae
- Genus: Lithasia
- Species: L. verrucosa

Binomial name
- Lithasia verrucosa (Rafinesque, 1820)

Synonyms
- List: Angitrema verrucosa (Rafinesque, 1820); Goniobasis aequalis (Haldeman, 1842); Goniobasis auricoma Lea, 1862; Goniobasis procissa Tryon, 1864; Goniobasis stewardsoniana Lea, 1862; Melania aequalis Haldeman, 1842; Melania fusiformis Lea, 1841; Melania holstonia Lea, 1841; Melania nupera Say, 1829; Melania procissa Anthony, 1854; Melania proscissa Anthony, 1854; Melanopsis semigranulosa Deshayes, 1832; Paludina humerosa Anthony, 1860; Pleurocera verrucosa Rafinesque, 1820

= Varicose rocksnail =

Species of gastropod

The varicose rocksnail also known as the verrucose file snail, scientific name Lithasia verrucosa, is a species of freshwater snail with an operculum, an aquatic gastropod mollusk in the family Pleuroceridae. This species is endemic to the United States.
