= Knobby rocksnail =

Conservation status
- Data Deficient (IUCN 2.3)

- Critically Imperiled (NatureServe)

Scientific classification
- Kingdom: Animalia
- Phylum: Mollusca
- Class: Gastropoda
- Subclass: Caenogastropoda
- Order: incertae sedis
- Family: Pleuroceridae
- Genus: Lithasia
- Species: L. curta

Binomial name
- Lithasia curta Lea, 1868

Species of gastropod

The knobby rocksnail, scientific name Lithasia curta, is a species of medium-sized freshwater snail, an aquatic gilled gastropod mollusk in the family Pleuroceridae. This species is endemic to the United States.
