= Magazine Mountain middle-toothed snail =

Conservation status
- Critically Endangered (IUCN 2.3)

- Critically Imperiled (NatureServe)

Scientific classification
- Kingdom: Animalia
- Phylum: Mollusca
- Class: Gastropoda
- Order: Stylommatophora
- Family: Polygyridae
- Genus: Inflectarius
- Species: I. magazinensis

Binomial name
- Inflectarius magazinensis (Pilsbry & Ferris, 1907)

Synonyms
- Mesodon magazinensis Pilsbry & Ferris, 1907

Species of gastropod

The Magazine Mountain middle-toothed snail, also known as the Magazine Mountain shagreen, scientific name Inflectarius magazinensis, is a species of small, air-breathing, land snails, terrestrial pulmonate gastropod molluscs in the family Polygyridae.

== Distribution ==
This species is endemic to Mount Magazine in Arkansas, the United States. Its natural habitat is rocky areas.

== Conservation efforts ==
The Magazine Mountain shagreen was listed as threatened on April 17, 1989. Thanks to efforts from the U.S. Forest Service, US Fish and Wildlife Service, and the Arkansas Department of Parks and Tourism, the snail was removed from the endangered list in May 2013. The shagreen is the first invertebrate ever removed from the federal endangered species list.
