= Dutton's river snail =

Conservation status
- Vulnerable (IUCN 2.3)

- Imperiled (NatureServe)

Scientific classification
- Kingdom: Animalia
- Phylum: Mollusca
- Class: Gastropoda
- Subclass: Caenogastropoda
- Order: incertae sedis
- Family: Pleuroceridae
- Genus: Lithasia
- Species: L. duttoniana

Binomial name
- Lithasia duttoniana (Lea, 1841)

Synonyms
- Io fasciolata Reeve, 1860; Melania duttoniana Lea, 1841

Species of gastropod

Dutton's river snail also known as the helmet rocksnail, scientific name Lithasia duttoniana, is a species of freshwater snails with an operculum, aquatic gastropod mollusks in the family Pleuroceridae. This species is endemic to the United States.
