= Jay's river snail =

Conservation status
- Data Deficient (IUCN 3.1)

- Critically Imperiled (NatureServe)

Scientific classification
- Kingdom: Animalia
- Phylum: Mollusca
- Class: Gastropoda
- Subclass: Caenogastropoda
- Order: incertae sedis
- Family: Pleuroceridae
- Genus: Lithasia
- Species: L. jayana

Binomial name
- Lithasia jayana (Lea, 1841)

Synonyms
- Melania jayana Lea, 1841; Melania robulina Gould, 1851

Species of gastropod

Jay's river snail also known as the rugose rocksnail, scientific name Lithasia jayana, is a species of small freshwater snail with a gill and an operculum, an aquatic gastropod mollusk in the family Pleuroceridae, the hornsnails. This species is endemic to the United States.
