= Fumonelix jonesiana =

- Fumonelix jonesiana shell

Conservation status
- Data Deficient (IUCN 2.3)

- Critically Imperiled (NatureServe)

Scientific classification
- Kingdom: Animalia
- Phylum: Mollusca
- Class: Gastropoda
- Order: Stylommatophora
- Family: Polygyridae
- Genus: Fumonelix
- Species: F. jonesiana

Binomial name
- Fumonelix jonesiana (Archer, 1938)

Synonyms
- Mesodon jonesianus

Species of gastropod

Fumonelix jonesiana (syn. Mesodon jonesianus) is a species of land snail in the family Polygyridae. Its common names are Jones' middle-toothed land snail and big-tooth covert. It is native to North Carolina and Tennessee in the United States, where it occurs in Great Smoky Mountains National Park.
