= Albert G. Wetherby =

American malacologist and mineralogist

Albert Gallatin Wetherby (1833 in Pittsburgh – February 15, 1902 in Magnetic City, Mitchell County, North Carolina) was an American malacologist and mineralogist.

Wetherby conducted his early education in Cleveland, Ohio before moving to Cincinnati in 1861. There he was appointed principal of the Woodburn public school. Later in 1870, he was selected to serve as the Chair of Natural History and Cincinnati University. A position he held for six years.

He was from 1870 Professor of Natural History at Cincinnati University.

Later he moved to North Carolina and became a businessman.

He died of heart failure on February 15th, and was buried in Magnetic City February 18th 1902.

== Works ==
- with Harper, G.W. 1876. Catalogue of the land and fresh water Mollusca, found in the immediate vicinity of Cincinnati, O.James Barclay Printing House, Cincinnati, Ohio. 1:1–5.
- 1881. On the geographical distribution of certain fresh-water mollusks of North America, and the probable causes of their variation. Journal of the Cincinnati Society of Natural History 3:317–324; 4(2):156–166.
- 1883. [Relation of mollusks to their shells]. Journal of the Cincinnati Society of Natural History 6(1):2.
