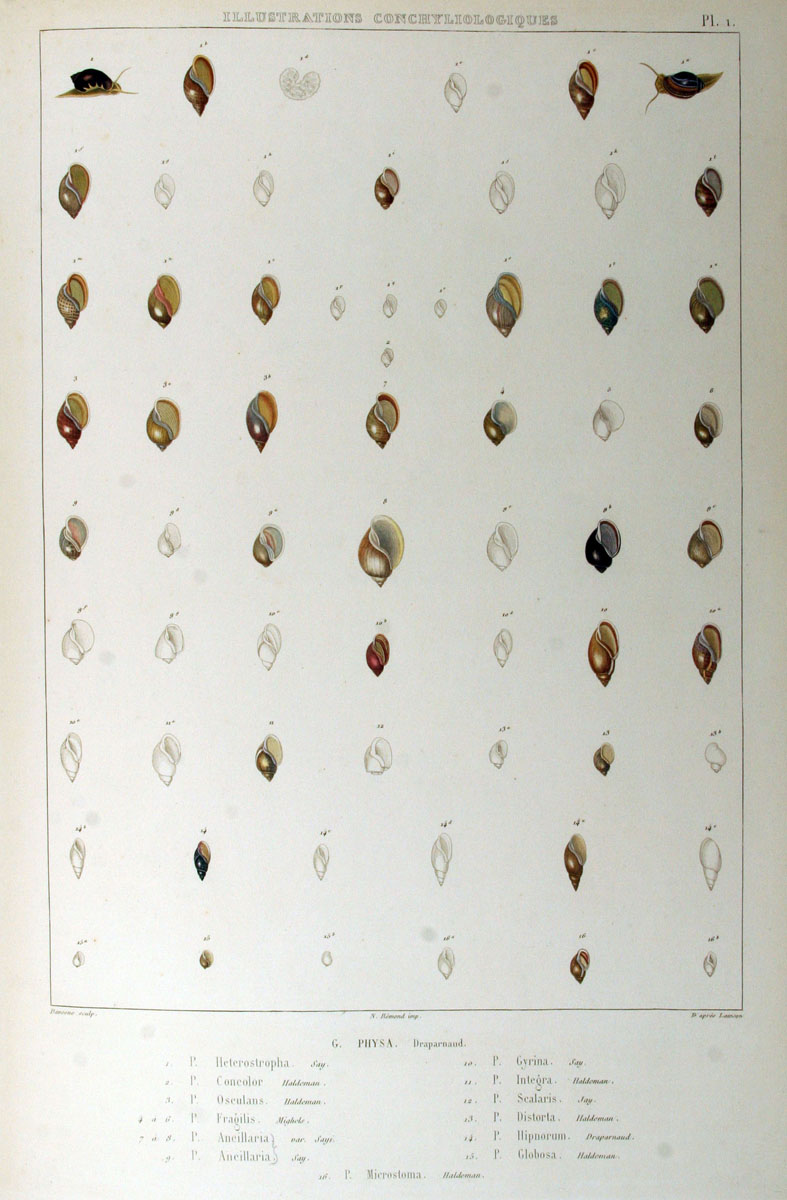
- Physella gyrina figure 10

Conservation status
- Least Concern (IUCN 3.1)

- Secure (NatureServe)

Scientific classification
- Kingdom: Animalia
- Phylum: Mollusca
- Class: Gastropoda
- Superorder: Hygrophila
- Family: Physidae
- Genus: Physella
- Species: P. gyrina

Binomial name
- Physella gyrina (Say, 1821)

Synonyms
- List: Aplexa microstriata Chamberlin & E. G. Berry, 1930; Archiphysa parkeri (Currier, 1881); superseded combination; Bulinus crassulus typica H. Beck, 1838; junior synonym; Physa albofilata Sampson, 1894; Physa altonensis I. Lea, 1864; junior synonym; Physa ampullacea A. A. Gould, 1865; junior synonym; Physa amygdalus G. B. Sowerby II, 1873; Physa ancillaria Say, 1825; Physa ancillaria magnalacustris B. Walker, 1901; unaccepted rank; Physa ancillaria var. magnalacustris B. Walker, 1901; Physa aurea I. Lea, 1864; Physa binneyana Ancey, 1886; Physa blandii I. Lea, 1864; Physa brevispira I. Lea, 1864; junior synonym; Physa bullata A. A. Gould, 1855; invalid; Physa carltonii I. Lea, 1869; Physa concolor Haldeman, 1841; Physa coniformis Tryon, 1866; Physa crocata I. Lea, 1864; junior synonym; Physa cylindrica De Kay, 1843; Physa deformis Currier, 1867; junior synonym; Physa diaphana Tryon, 1865; junior homonym; Physa elliptica I. Lea, 1834; junior synonym; Physa elliptica troostiana I. Lea, 1841; junior synonym; Physa elliptica var. decollata T. D. A. Cockerell, 1888; Physa febigerii I. Lea, 1864; junior synonym; Physa forsheyi f. whitei I. Lea, 1864; junior subjective synonym; Physa fragilis De Kay, 1840; nomen nudum; Physa fragilis De Kay, 1843; Physa fragilis Mighels & C. B. Adams, 1842; junior synonym; Physa gabbii Tryon, 1863; Physa goodrichi Clench, 1926; Physa gouldi Clench, 1935; junior subjective synonym; Physa gyrina Say, 1821; superseded combination; Physa gyrina albofilata Sampson, 1894; junior synonym; Physa gyrina byersi Crabb, 1927; nomen nudum; Physa gyrina elliptica I. Lea, 1834; junior synonym; Physa gyrina f. aurea I. Lea, 1838; junior synonym; Physa gyrina f. febigerii I. Lea, 1864; junior synonym; Physa gyrina f. hawni I. Lea, 1864; Forma; Physa gyrina f. nicklinii I. Lea, 1864; junior synonym; Physa gyrina f. smithsoniana I. Lea, 1864; Forma; Physa gyrina hildrethiana I. Lea, 1841; junior synonym; Physa gyrina oleacea Tryon, 1866; junior subjective synonym; Physa gyrina var. albofilata Sampson, 1894; junior synonym; Physa hawnii I. Lea, 1864; junior synonym; Physa heterostropha var. heterostrophella T. D. A. Cockerell, 1889; Physa heterostrophella T. D. A. Cockerell, 1889; junior synonym; Physa heterostrophella f. brevis T. D. A. Cockerell, 1889; Physa heterostrophella f. elongata T. D. A. Cockerell, 1889; Physa hildrethiana I. Lea, 1841; junior synonym; Physa jennessi athearni A. H. Clarke, 1973; Physa lordi utahensis Clench, 1925; junior synonym; Physa malleata Tryon, 1865; Physa margarita R. P. Lesson, 1840; Physa microstoma Haldeman, 1840; Physa niagarensis f. saffordii I. Lea, 1864; junior synonym; Physa nicklinii I. Lea, 1864; junior synonym; Physa nuttallii I. Lea, 1864; junior subjective synonym; Physa obesa De Kay, 1843; Physa occidentalis Tryon, 1865; Physa oleacea Tryon, 1866; junior synonym; Physa parkeri Currier, 1881; superseded combination; Physa plena Clench, 1930; Physa remingtoni Clench, 1930; Physa saffordii I. Lea, 1864; junior synonym; Physa salina Clench, 1930; Physa sayi warreniana I. Lea, 1864; junior subjective synonym; Physa sayii Kirtland, 1838; nomen nudum; Physa sayii Tappan, 1839; junior subjective synonym; Physa smithi F. C. Baker, 1919; Physa smithiana F. C. Baker, 1920; replacement name; Physa smithsoniana I. Lea, 1864; junior synonym; Physa subarata Menke, 1828; junior synonym; Physa subrotunda G. B. Sowerby II, 1873; Physa triticea I. Lea, 1856; junior synonym; Physa troostensis I. Lea, 1841; junior synonym; Physa troostiana I. Lea, 1844; Physa venusta I. Lea, 1864; Physa warreniana I. Lea, 1864; Physa whitei I. Lea, 1864; junior synonym; Physa wolfiana I. Lea, 1869; junior subjective synonym; Physella ancillaria (Say, 1825); junior subjective synonym; Physella aurea (I. Lea, 1838); junior subjective synonym; Physella bayfieldensis F. C. Baker, 1928; Physella brevispira (I. Lea, 1864); junior subjective synonym; Physella chetekensis F. C. Baker, 1928; Physella elliptica (I. Lea, 1834); Physella magnalacustris (B. Walker, 1901); junior subjective synonym; Physella microstoma (Haldeman, 1840); junior subjective synonym; Physella microstriata (Chamberlin & E. G. Berry, 1930); superseded combination; Physella obrussoides F. C. Baker, 1928; Physella parkeri (Currier, 1881); junior subjective synonym; Physella wrighti Te & A. H. Clarke, 1985; junior synonym; Utahphysa microstriata (Chamberlin & E. G. Berry, 1930); junior subjective synonym

= Physella gyrina =

Species of gastropod

Physella gyrina, common name the "tadpole physa", is a species of small, left-handed or sinistral, air-breathing freshwater snail, an aquatic pulmonate gastropod mollusk in the family Physidae.

== Shell description ==
Snails in the family Physidae have shells that are sinistral, which means that if the shell is held with the spire pointing up, and the aperture is facing the observer, the aperture is on the left-hand side.

The shells of Physella species have a long and large aperture, a pointed spire, and no operculum. The shells are thin and corneous and rather transparent.

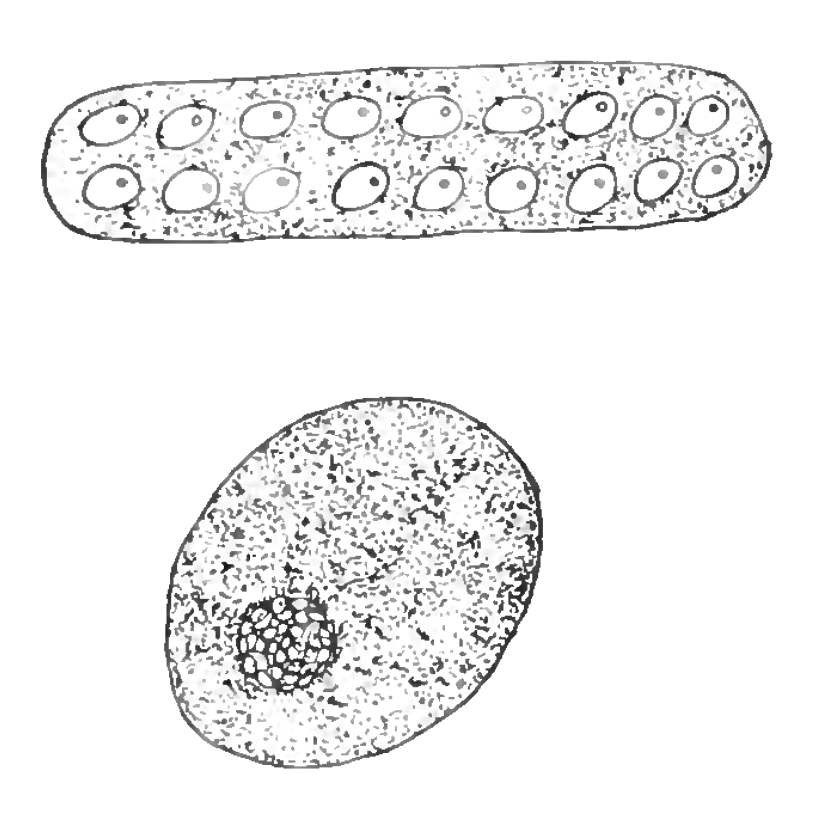
Drawing of the eggs of Physella gyrina: upper image is the egg-mass showing position of eggs in envelope. Lower images is a single egg showing the position of an embryo.

When food resources are limited, Physella gyrina allocates more energy to reproduction than growth, helping the species survive under harsh environmental conditions.

Genetic studies indicate that Physella gyrina shows population level genetic differences across its range, suggesting that it adapts rapidly to diverse freshwater environments.

== Distribution ==
This species is known to occur in:

- the USA - indigenous
- Great Britain - introduced
- Ireland - introduced
- Spain
