= Snake River physa snail =

Conservation status
- Data Deficient (IUCN 2.3)

- Critically Imperiled (NatureServe)

Scientific classification
- Kingdom: Animalia
- Phylum: Mollusca
- Class: Gastropoda
- Superorder: Hygrophila
- Family: Physidae
- Genus: Physella
- Species: P. natricina

Binomial name
- Physella natricina Taylor, 1988

Synonyms
- Haitia (Physa) natricina Taylor, 1988

Species of gastropod

The Snake River physa snail, scientific name Physella natricina, is a species of freshwater snail, an aquatic gastropod mollusk in the family Physidae. This species is endemic to Idaho in the United States.

The Snake River physa snail Haitia (Physa) natricina Taylor, 1988 is found in the middle Snake River of southern Idaho.

== Description ==
This species has an ovoid shell that is amber to brown in color, and has 3 to 3.5 whorls. It can reach a maximum length of about 6.5 millimetres (0.26 in).

== Ecology ==
While much information exists on the family Physidae in general, very little is known about the biology or ecology of this particular species.

=== Habitat and distribution ===
This snail is believed to be confined to the Snake River, inhabiting areas of swift current on the undersides of large cobbles and boulder-sized rocks. In 1995, the U.S. Fish and Wildlife Service reported the known modern range of the species to be from Grandview, Idaho (ca. RM 487) to the Hagerman Reach of the Snake River (ca. RM 573).

The Snake River physa is believed to have evolved during the Pleistocene-Holocene in the lakes and rivers of northern Utah and southeastern Idaho. It is thought that the species may have existed in the Snake River since approximately 3.5 million years ago.

== Conservation ==
The Snake River physa is rare, with fewer than 50 total individuals having been collected. The recovery area for the species extends from Snake River mile 553 to Snake River mile 675. It is currently listed as an Endangered species since 14 December 1992.
