= Wet rock physa =

Conservation status
- Vulnerable (IUCN 2.3)

- Critically Imperiled (NatureServe)

Scientific classification
- Kingdom: Animalia
- Phylum: Mollusca
- Class: Gastropoda
- Superorder: Hygrophila
- Family: Physidae
- Genus: Physella
- Species: P. zionis

Binomial name
- Physella zionis Pilsbry, 1926

Species of gastropod

The Wet rock physa, scientific name Physella zionis, is a species of freshwater snail, an aquatic pulmonate gastropod mollusc in the family Physidae, the bladder snails. This species is endemic to two connected canyons, Zion Canyon and Orderville Canyon, along the north fork of the Virgin River in Zion National Park, Washington County, Utah, a stretch of about 5 kilometers (3.1 mi).
