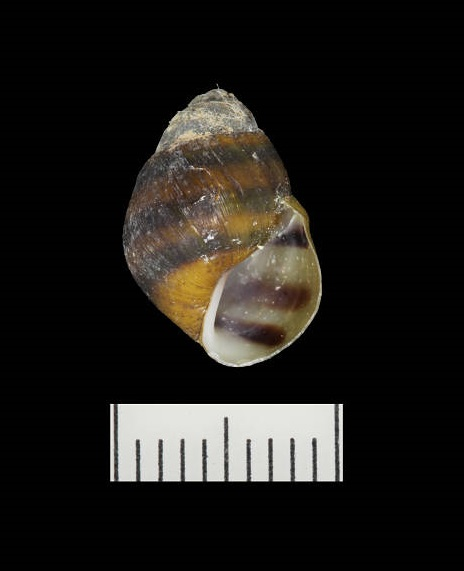
- Museum specimen of shell

Conservation status
- Critically Endangered (IUCN 3.1)

- Critically Imperiled (NatureServe)

Scientific classification
- Kingdom: Animalia
- Phylum: Mollusca
- Class: Gastropoda
- Subclass: Caenogastropoda
- Order: incertae sedis
- Family: Pleuroceridae
- Genus: Leptoxis
- Species: L. plicata

Binomial name
- Leptoxis plicata Conrad, 1834

Synonyms
- Anculosa bella Lea, 1841; Anculosa rubiginosa Lea, 1841; Anculosa tuberculata Lea, 1841; Anculotus pictus Conrad, 1834; Anculotus plicatus Conrad, 1834; Anculotus smaragdinus Reeve, 1860

= Plicate rocksnail =

Species of gastropod

The plicate rocksnail, scientific name Leptoxis plicata, is a species of freshwater snail with a gill and an operculum, an aquatic gastropod mollusk in the family Pleuroceridae.

This species is endemic to the United States, specifically the state of Alabama. The snail has been listed as endangered on the United States Fish and Wildlife Service list of endangered species since October 28, 1998.

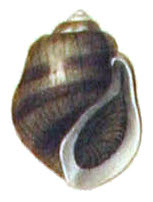
1842 drawing of the shell by Jean-Charles Chenu.

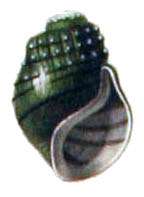
1842 drawing of a green shell Leptoxis plicata.

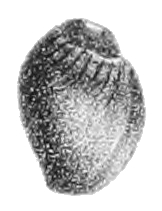
Drawing of abaperural view of the shell of Leptoxis plicata by Timothy Abbott Conrad.

== Description ==
The plicate rocksnail is a pleurocerid snail with a shell that grows to about 20 mm (0.8 in) in length. Shells are subglobose with broadly rounded apertures. The body whorl may be ornamented with strong folds or plicae. Shell color is usually brown, occasionally green, and often with four equidistant color bands. The columella (central column or axis) is smooth, rounded, and typically pigmented in the upper half. The aperture is usually bluish-white, occasionally pink or white.

The operculum (plate that closes the shell when the snail is retracted) is dark red, and moderately thick.

Although morphologically similar to the basin's other three surviving rocksnail species, the plicate rocksnail is genetically distinct.

== Distribution ==
The plicate rocksnail historically occurred in the Black Warrior River, the Little Warrior River, and the Tombigbee River.

Recent status surveys have located plicate rocksnail populations only in an approximately 88 km (55 mi) reach of the Locust Fork of the Black Warrior River, Jefferson and Blount counties, Alabama. The latest survey information indicates that the snail has recently disappeared from the upstream two-thirds portion of that habitat and now appears to be restricted to an approximately 32 km (20 mi) reach in Jefferson County.

== Reasons for the decline ==
The plicate rocksnail has disappeared from more than 90 percent of its historic range. The curtailment of habitat and range for this species (and a few other snail species) in the Mobile Basin's larger rivers – (Black Warrior River, the Little Warrior River, and the Tombigbee River for the plicate rocksnail) is primarily due to extensive construction of dams, and the subsequent inundation of the snail's shoal habitats by the impounded waters. This snail has disappeared from all portions of its historic habitats that have been impounded by dams.

Dams change such areas by eliminating or reducing currents, and thus allowing sediments to accumulate on inundated channel habitats. Impounded waters also experience changes in water chemistry, which could affect survival or reproduction of riverine snails. For example, many reservoirs in the Basin currently experience eutrophic (enrichment of a water body with nutrients) conditions, and chronically low dissolved oxygen levels. Such physical and chemical changes can affect feeding, respiration, and reproduction of these riffle and shoal snail species.

== Ecology ==
=== Habitat ===
Plicate rocksnails inhabit shallow gravel and cobble shoals in the flowing waters of rivers.

=== Life cycle ===
Although the precise longevity has not been well documented, individuals have survived 2 years in captivity.
