= Fumonelix archeri =

- Fumonelix archeri
- Fumonelix archeri shell

Conservation status
- Data Deficient (IUCN 2.3)

- Critically Imperiled (NatureServe)

Scientific classification
- Kingdom: Animalia
- Phylum: Mollusca
- Class: Gastropoda
- Order: Stylommatophora
- Family: Polygyridae
- Genus: Fumonelix
- Species: F. archeri

Binomial name
- Fumonelix archeri Pilsbry, 1940

Synonyms
- Mesodon archeri

Species of gastropod

Fumonelix archeri (syn. Mesodon archeri) is a species of land snail in the family Polygyridae known commonly as Archer's toothed land snail and Ocoee covert. It is endemic to Tennessee in the United States, where it is known only from Goforth Creek in Polk County.
