= Timothy Abbott Conrad =

American geologist and malacologist

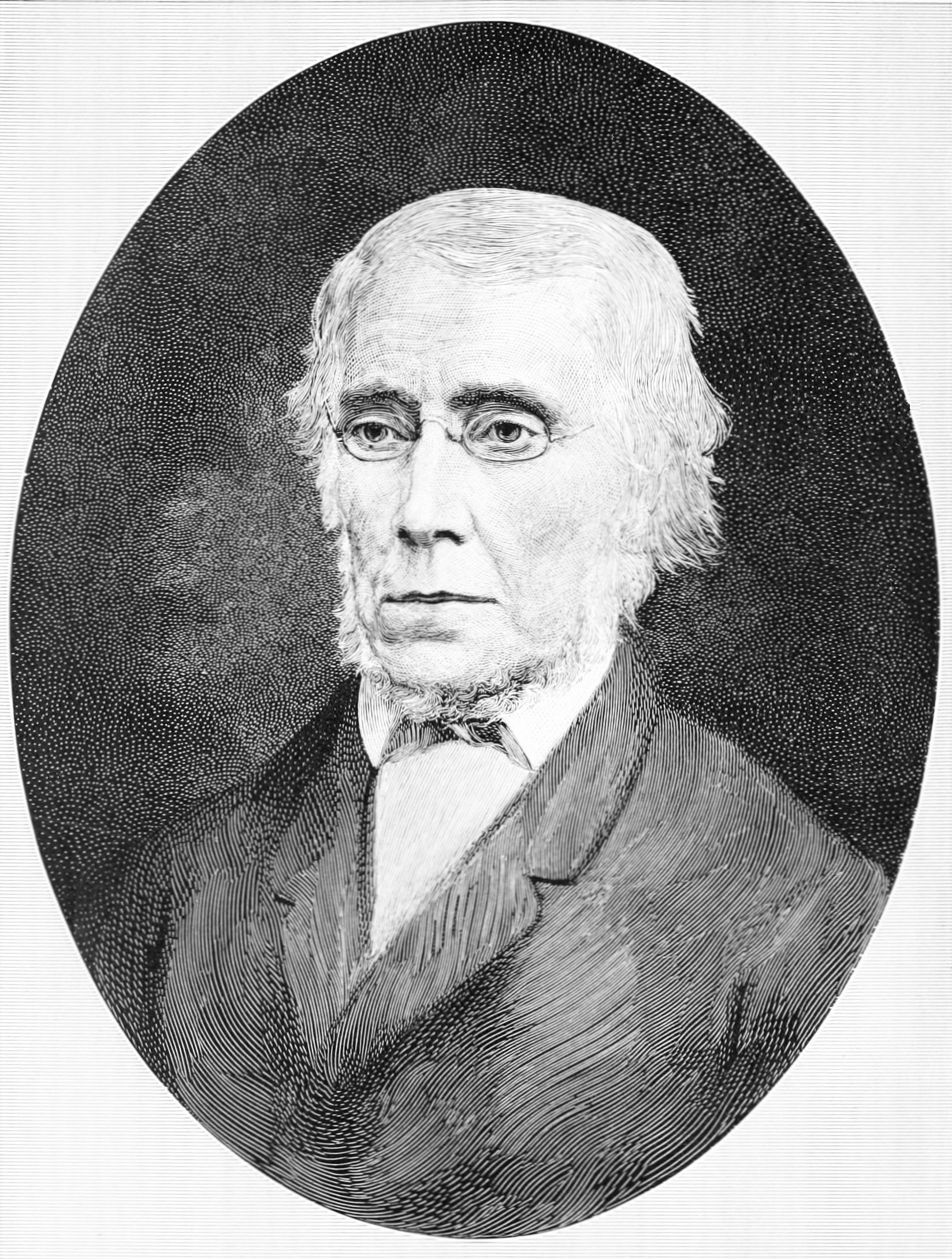
- Born: June 21, 1803; Trenton, New Jersey
- Died: August 9, 1877 (aged 74); Trenton, New Jersey
- Known for: Tertiary and Cretaceous shells; mollusks; Monography of the Family Unionidae
- Scientific career
- Fields: geology; malacology
- Author abbrev. (zoology): Conrad

Timothy Abbott Conrad (June 21, 1803 in Trenton, New Jersey – August 9, 1877 in Trenton) was an American geologist and malacologist.

== Biography ==
He was from early life an investigator of American paleontology and natural history, devoting himself to the study of the shells of the Tertiary and Cretaceous formations, and to existing species of mollusks. In 1831 he began the issue of a work on "American Marine Conchology", and the year following published the first number of his "Fossil Shells of the Tertiary Formation", which was never completed. A "Monography of the Family Unionidae" was issued between 1835 and 1847. The lithographed plates in his publications were in part his own work. He contributed many articles to the American Journal of Science and the Journal of the Philadelphia Academy of Science.

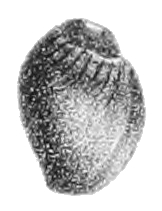
Drawing of Leptoxis plicata by Conrad

As one of the New York state geologists he prepared the geological report for 1837. He was paleontologist of the New York Geological Survey from 1838 until 1841, and wrote the annual reports in that department. He also made the reports of paleontological discoveries in the Pacific Railroad Survey and the Mexican Boundary Survey.

He defended the theory of periodical refrigeration, and suggested that the Mississippi depression was the consequence of the upheaval of the Appalachians and the later elevation of the area of the Rocky Mountains. A list of his scientific papers is given in the catalogue of the Royal Society of England. The American Philosophical Society elected Conrad to Membership in 1865 for his contributions to science.

Conrad is colloquially known as the "Father of Coastal Plain Geology", having named nearly 1000 Cenozoic species in the region. He is characterized as a "shy, almost reclusive, moody, unhappy man, who rarely held any type of paid position for very long. His carelessness was notorious, and toward the end of his life he suffered from a loss of memory that finally caused him to give up work all together."

== See also ==
- Category:Taxa named by Timothy Abbott Conrad
