= Anguispira holroydensis =

Scientific classification
- Kingdom: Animalia
- Phylum: Mollusca
- Class: Gastropoda
- Order: Stylommatophora
- Family: Discidae
- Genus: Anguispira
- Species: A. holroydensis

Binomial name
- Anguispira holroydensis Russell, 1956

Extinct species of land snail

Anguispira holroydensis was a species of pulmonate land snail in the family Discidae, the disk snails. The species is only known from fossilized specimens. It was first described by Loris S. Russell in 1956.

== Fossils ==
The most well-studied A. holroydensis fossil was found in the North Park Formation in Carbon County, Wyoming. The shell's position in the formation dates it to the Late Miocene.

== Physical appearance ==
Russell describes the A. holroydensis fossil as being visually similar to Anguispira cumberlandiana and Anguispira alternata. The shell is small, only 7.9 mm in diameter, with a low spire and deep umbilicus. The surface of the first one and a half whorls is smooth, with the remainder being marked by fine retractive ridges (costulae).
