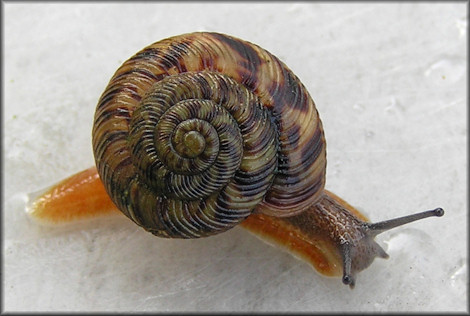
- A mature Appalachian tigersnail found in Tennessee

Conservation status
- Apparently Secure (NatureServe)

Scientific classification
- Kingdom: Animalia
- Phylum: Mollusca
- Class: Gastropoda
- Order: Stylommatophora
- Family: Discidae
- Genus: Anguispira
- Species: A. mordax

Binomial name
- Anguispira mordax (Shuttleworth, 1852)

Synonyms
- Helix mordax (Shuttleworth, 1852); Anguispira alternata smithi (Walker, 1928); Anguispira alternata paucicostata (Kutchka, 1938)

= Anguispira mordax =

Species of land snail

Anguispira mordax, also known as the Appalachian tigersnail, is a species of pulmonate land snail in the family Discidae endemic to the southeastern United States. It is named after the Appalachian mountain range.

== Appearance ==
The Appalachian tigersnail has a dull, slightly depressed shell ranging from 13 to 18 mm in diameter. It is heavily ribbed, with the ribs being roughly 1-1.5mm apart. This gives the shell a distinct ′wavy′ look. It is striated with a defined carina and a narrow, deep umbilicus. The shell is yellowish or "buckthorn brown" in color, defined by darker brown or reddish streaks that radiate outwards across the shell, running parallel to the radial ribs.

== Ecology ==
Populations of Appalachian tigersnail have been found across Alabama, Tennessee, Kentucky, Virginia, North Carolina, and West Virginia. It is listed as vulnerable in Kentucky, Virginia, and North Carolina and as imperiled in West Virginia.

The Appalachian tigersnail is found in a wide range of habitats similar to those of its close relative, Anguispira alternata. It is typically found in mesic hardwood forests on or around decaying logs, hollow trees, or limestone outcrops.

There is some uncertainty surrounding the Appalachian tigersnail's taxonomy due to its tendency to hybridize with close relatives Anguispira alternata and Anguispira stronglyodes. Malacologist Leslie Hubricht claims the only ′pure′ populations of Appalachian tigersnail exist in the mountains of North Carolina.
