= Anguispira stihleri =

Conservation status
- Critically Imperiled (NatureServe)

Scientific classification
- Kingdom: Animalia
- Phylum: Mollusca
- Class: Gastropoda
- Order: Stylommatophora
- Family: Discidae
- Genus: Anguispira
- Species: A. stihleri

Binomial name
- Anguispira stihleri Dourson, 2015

Species of gastropod

Anguispira stihleri, also known as the Greenbrier tigersnail, is a rare, range-restricted species of pulmonate land snail endemic to Greenbrier County, West Virginia. It was first discovered in 1993 by biologist Craig Stilher, for whom it is named.

== Physical appearance ==
The Greenbrier tigersnail possesses an appearance similar to that of Anguispira cumberlandiana and Anguispira alabama, although it is notably smaller and less compressed than both species. The shell is a depressed heliciform shape and ranges from 15–18 mm (0.59–0.71 in) in diameter. It is striated, typically white or cream in color, and defined by splotchy brown stripes that radiate outwards across the entirety of the shell. The carina is pinched and pale in color.

== Ecology ==
=== Habitat ===
The Greenbrier tigersnail is a limestone specialist, and is restricted to limestone outcrops and cliffs in redcedar glades. They appear to prefer dry cliff faces without abundant vegetation. The snail's thin shell allows it to hide in limestone cracks and crevices to presumably shelter from the elements and predators.

=== Distribution ===
Only a single distinct population of Greenbrier tigersnail has been located. It is found in the area surrounding the Greenbrier River in Greenbrier County, West Virginia. Due to its limited range and relative isolation – with no other Anguispira relatives occurring within 600 km (370 mi) of the population – the species has been listed as critically imperiled.
