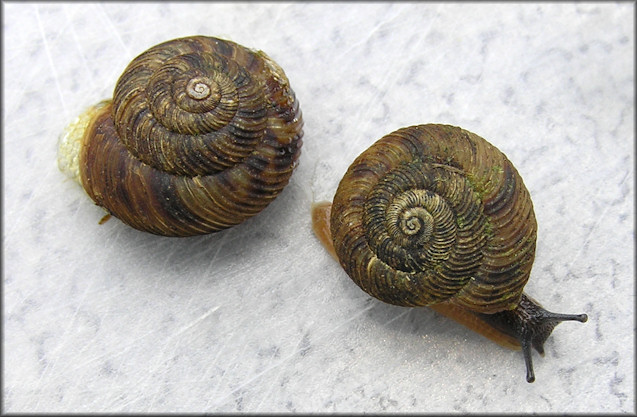
- Mature mountain tigersnails found in Tennessee

Conservation status
- Vulnerable (NatureServe)

Scientific classification
- Kingdom: Animalia
- Phylum: Mollusca
- Class: Gastropoda
- Order: Stylommatophora
- Family: Discidae
- Genus: Anguispira
- Species: A. jessica

Binomial name
- Anguispira jessica Kutchka, 1938

Synonyms
- Anguispira alternata jessica Kutchka, 1938

= Anguispira jessica =

Species of land snail

Anguispira jessica, also known as the mountain tigersnail or mountain disc, is a species of pulmonate land snail– a gastropod mollusk in the family Discidae, the disk snails. The species is named after G.M. Kutchka's wife Jessica; he was the first to describe the species in 1938. It was originally considered a subspecies of Angusipira alternata, but has since been elevated to species status.

== Appearance ==
The mountain tigersnail's shell is striated with an elevated apex, and ranges from 17 to 21 mm in diameter. It is pale or light brown in color, with either defined or slightly blotchy reddish-brown stripes. There is a set of reddish-brown square-shaped markings slightly below the periphery that extend underneath the shell. Its carina is notably less defined than others in the Anguispira genus.

== Habitat ==
The mountain tigersnail is typically found in mountainous areas with high elevation (above 800 meters), although animals have been located at lower elevations as well. The species is often found on or around rotting hardwood logs in upland mixed hardwood forest.

Populations have been found in northern Alabama and along the Tennessee-North Carolina border. Additionally, the species is known to inhabit a single county in southwest Virginia: Grayson County. Due to the scarcity of sightings and difficulty of locating new populations, it is listed as vulnerable in Tennessee and North Carolina and critically imperiled in Virginia and Alabama.
