= Anguispira rugoderma =

Conservation status
- Vulnerable (NatureServe)

Scientific classification
- Kingdom: Animalia
- Phylum: Mollusca
- Class: Gastropoda
- Order: Stylommatophora
- Family: Discidae
- Genus: Anguispira
- Species: A. rugoderma

Binomial name
- Anguispira rugoderma Hubricht, 1938

Species of land snail

Anguispira rugoderma, also known as the Pine Mountain tigersnail, is a rare, narrow-ranged species of pulmonate land snail in the family Discidae, the disk snails. It is named after the Pine Mountain ridge, a section of the Appalachian Mountains that overlaps with the snail's range.

== Appearance ==
The Pine Mountain tigersnail is visually similar to its close relative Anguispira alternata. However, its shell is larger, its markings are less prominent, and its umbilicus is wider than alternata's. The shell ranges from 21 to 30 mm (0.83 to 1.18 in) in width and 12.5 to 16.4 mm (0.49 to 0.65 in) in height. It has strong ribs which extend over the periphery and into the umbilicus, giving the shell a slightly wavy appearance. The snail's appearance is defined by irregular brown splotches that radiate outwards across the entirety of the shell.

== Ecology ==
The Pine Mountain tigersnail is a rare and relatively understudied species, being known from only nineteen occurrences. Seventeen were recorded by the Kentucky Heritage Program in 2022 and two were recorded by Leslie Hubricht in 1968. It has been found in Clay, Harlan, Bell, and Leslie Counties in southeastern Kentucky. Its known range is fairly small, covering only 1,097 km^{2} (424 sq mi). It is listed as vulnerable globally and imperiled in Kentucky.

The Pine Mountain tigersnail is most commonly found in old growth hardwood forests on or around large decaying logs and limestone outcrops. It has also been found in pure, mature second-growth stands of tulip poplar.

== Threats ==
Like other land snail species, the Pine Mountain tigersnail is threatened by habitat loss and fragmentation. Currently, crucial habitat is subject to active limestone mining, deforestation, and development. They are also likely to be negatively impacted by the effects of climate change, such as extreme temperatures, flooding, and drought. Though the species' entire range is not protected, many key populations occur within protected areas such as the Daniel Boone National Forest and Pine Mountains Wildlife Corridor, which likely mitigates some of these threats.
