= Anguispira knoxensis =

Conservation status
- Critically Imperiled (NatureServe)

Scientific classification
- Kingdom: Animalia
- Phylum: Mollusca
- Class: Gastropoda
- Order: Stylommatophora
- Family: Discidae
- Genus: Anguispira
- Species: A. knoxensis

Binomial name
- Anguispira knoxensis (Pilsbry, 1901)

Synonyms
- Pyramidula alternata var. knoxensis (Pilsbry, 1901)

Species of land snail

Anguispira knoxensis, also known as the rustic tigersnail or rustic disk, is a rare species of pulmonate land snail in the family Discidae, the disk snails. It is endemic to the Great Smoky Mountains in southeastern Tennessee. It was originally considered a subspecies of Anguispira alternata.

== Appearance ==
Rustic tigersnails are described as having a larger, more robust shell than Anguispira alternata marked by small, fine riblets. The entire shell is covered with a secondary structure of fine wrinkles, almost invisible to the naked eye, but that give the shell a 'dull' appearance compared to other Anguispira species. It is described as rusty brown in color with inconspicuous flame-like markings. The shell ranges from 23 to 25 mm in diameter.

== Ecology ==
The rustic tigersnail can currently be found in three counties in Tennessee: Monroe, Blount, and Knox Counties. Additionally, a population was historically recorded around Hazel Creek in North Carolina; the species is now considered likely extirpated from the state.

The rustic tigersnail can be found in or around large, rotting hardwood logs in advanced stages of decay, in leaf mold, or in soil. They are typically found near limestone outcrops.

Due to the species' limited range the difficulty of locating new populations, the rustic tigersnail is listed as critically imperiled in Tennessee.
