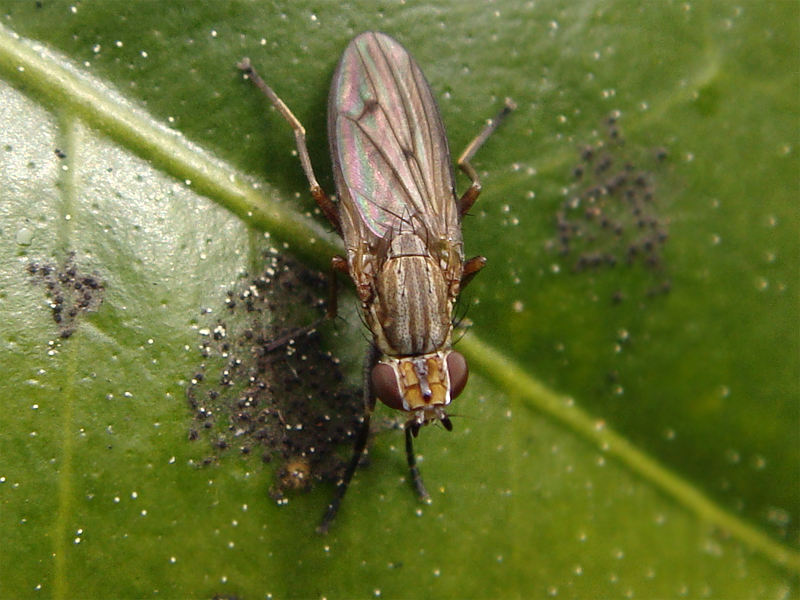
- Pherbellia cinerella

Scientific classification
- Kingdom: Animalia
- Phylum: Arthropoda
- Class: Insecta
- Order: Diptera
- Family: Sciomyzidae
- Tribe: Sciomyzini
- Genus: Pherbellia; Robineau-Desvoidy, 1830

Type species
- Pherbellia vernallis Robineau-Desvoidy, 1830

Species
- About 95, see text

Synonyms
- Melina Robineau-Desvoidy, 1830; Chetocera Robineau-Desvoidy, 1830; Ditaenia Hendel, 1902; Ditaeniella Sack, 1939; Oxytaenia Sack, 1939

= Pherbellia =

Genus of flies

Pherbellia is a genus of flies in the family Sciomyzidae, the marsh flies or snail-killing flies. They occur throughout the world, except for the Subantarctic region.

Like many Sciomyzidae, species of this genus have larvae that are predators or parasitoids of snails. The larva of P. albovaria, for example, eats land snails such as Anguispira alternata and A. fergusoni, and then pupates in the empty shell. The P. albocostata larva eats up to five snails and then pupates in the ground litter next to the last empty shell. The larva of P. inflexa attacks the glass snail Zonitoides arboreus.

P. punctata is a parasitoid on the amber snail Succinea putris. P. anubis larvae feed on several types of freshwater snails along the edges of ponds and marshes. Several Pherbellia are predators of the pond snail Stagnicola palustris. While most snail-killing flies target land and freshwater pulmonate snails, P. prefixa preys on the mossy valvata (Valvata sincera), which is an operculate snail in the valve snail family.

As of 2012 there were about 95 species in the genus.

== Species ==
Pherbellia albocostata in the lower vegetation near a small pond

Two males of Pherbellia annulipes face off on a stump

Pherbellia cinerella

Species in this genus include:

- Subgenus Chetocera Robineau-Desvoidy, 1830

- P. albicarpa (Rondani, 1868)
- P. albocostata (Fallén, 1820)
- P. albovaria (Coquillett, 1901)
- P. alpina (Frey, 1930)
- P. annulipes (Zetterstedt, 1846)
- P. anubis Knutson, 1969
- P. argyrotarsis (Becker, 1908)
- P. austera (Meigen, 1830)
- P. czernyi (Hendel, 1902)
- P. dorsata (Zetterstedt, 1846)
- P. dubia (Fallén, 1820)
- P. fisheri Orth, 1987
- P. footei Steyskal, 1961
- P. griseicollis (Becker, 1900)
- P. griseola (Fallén, 1820)
- P. hackmani Rozkosny, 1982
- P. hermonensis Knutson & Freidberg, 1983
- P. idahoensis Steyskal, 1961
- P. inclusa (Wollaston, 1858)
- P. melanderi Steyskal, 1963
- P. nana (Fallén, 1820)
- P. obscura (Ringdahl, 1948)
- P. obtusa (Fallén, 1820)
- P. oregona Steyskal, 1961
- P. pallidiventris (Fallén, 1820)
- P. pilosa (Hendel, 1902)
- P. priscillae Knutson & Freidberg, 1983
- P. quadrata Steyskal, 1961
- P. rozkosnyi Verbeke, 1967
- P. scutellaris (von Roser, 1840)
- P. seticoxa Steyskal, 1961
- P. similis (Cresson, 1920)
- P. sordida (Hendel, 1902)
- P. steyskali Rozkosny & Zuska, 1965
- P. subtilis Orth & Steyskal, 1980
- P. suspecta Orth & Steyskal, 1981
- P. vitalis (Cresson, 1920)
- P. ventralis (Fallén, 1820)

- Subgenus Dictyomyza Enderlein, 1939

- P. clathrata (Loew, 1874)

- Subgenus Ditaenia Hendel, 1902

- P. cinerella (Fallén, 1820)

- Subgenus Graphomyzina Macquart, 1835

- P. cingulata (Verbeke, 1950)
- P. costata (Verbeke, 1950)
- P. dives (Bezzi, 1928)
- P. guttata (Coquillett, 1901)
- P. javana Meijere, 1911
- P. juxtajavana Knutson, Manguin & Orth, 1990
- P. kivuana (Verbeke, 1950)
- P. limbata (Meigen, 1830)
- P. trabeculata (Loew, 1872)

- Subgenus Oxytaenia Sack, 1939

- P. beatricis Steyskal, 1949
- P. borea Orth, 1982
- P. brunnipes (Meigen, 1838)
- P. bryanti Steyskal, 1967
- P. californica Orth, 1982
- P. knutsoni Verbeke, 1967
- P. marthae Orth, 1982
- P. mikiana (Hendel, 1900)
- P. pallidicarpa (Rondani, 1868)
- P. paludum Orth, 1982
- P. prefixa Steyskal, 1967
- P. propages Steyskal, 1967
- P. stackelbergi Elberg, 1965
- P. ursilacus Orth, 1982

- Subgenus Pherbellia Robineau-Desvoidy, 1830

- P. schoenherri (Fallén, 1826)

- unplaced

- P. aloea Orth, 1983
- P. argyra Verbeke, 1967
- P. brevistriata Li, Yang & Gu, 2001
- P. causta Hendel, 1913
- P. chiloesis (Malloch, 1933)
- P. dentata Merz & Rozkosny, 1995
- P. ditoma Steyskal, 1956
- P. evittata (Malloch, 1933)
- P. frohnei Steyskal, 1963
- P. garganica Rivosecchi, 1989
- P. goberti (Pandellé, 1902)
- P. guttipennis Hendel, 1932
- P. inflexa Orth, 1983
- P. koreana Rozkosny & Kozanek, 1989
- P. krivosheinae Rozkosny & Knutson, 1991
- P. kugleri Knutson, 1986
- P. luctifera (Loew, 1861)
- P. lutheri Rozkosny, 1982
- P. majuscula (Rondani, 1868)
- P. orientalis Rozkosny & Knutson, 1991
- P. ozerovi Rozkosny, 1991
- P. phela Steyskal, 1963
- P. philippii (Malloch, 1933)
- P. shatalkini Rozkosny, 1991
- P. silana Rivosecchi, 1989
- P. spectabilis Orth, 1984
- P. tenuipes (Loew, 1872)
- P. terminalis (Walker, 1858)
- P. tricolor Sueyoshi, 2001
- P. vittigera (Malloch, 1933)
