= List of non-marine molluscs of Nepal =

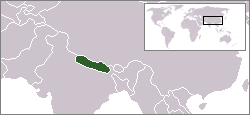
Location of Nepal

The non-marine molluscs of Nepal are a complete molluscan fauna of Nepal (wildlife of Nepal, environment of Nepal), because Nepal is landlocked country.

A number of species of non-marine molluscs are found in the wild in Nepal.

Summary table of number of species

(Summary table is based on species counted in this list and include also those ones with question marks)

	Nepal
freshwater gastropods	>10
land gastropods	138 species
gastropods altogether	???
bivalves	>4
molluscs altogether	???
non-indigenous gastropods in the wild	?? freshwater and ?? land
non-indigenous hot-house alien gastropods	?
non-indigenous bivalves in the wild	?
non-indigenous hot-house alien bivalves	?
non-indigenous molluscs altogether	?

Land slug Limax seticus lives in altitudes 4,700–4,800 m a.s.l. in Nepal. It is the highest locality where occurrence of land slugs was recorded.

== Freshwater gastropods ==
Freshwater gastropods in Nepal include:

Amnicolidae

- Erhaia banepaensis Nesemann & S. Sharma in Nesemann et al., 2007
- Erhaia chandeshwariensis Nesemann & S. Sharma in Nesemann et al., 2007
- Erhaia sugurensis Nesemann, Shah & Tachamo in Nesemann et al., 2007

Viviparidae

- Bellamya bengalensis (Lamarck, 1822)

Ampullariidae

- Pila globosa (Swainsen, 1822)

Thiaridae

- Tarebia granifera (Lamarck, 1822)

Pachychilidae

- Brotia costula (Rafinesque, 1833)

Lymnaeidae

- Austropeplea viridis (Quoy & Gaimard, 1832)
- Lymnaea acuminata Lamarck, 1822
- Radix luteola (Lamarck, 1822)

Planorbidae

- Indoplanorbis exustus (Deshayes, 1834)
- Gyraulus convexiusculus (Hutton, 1849)

== Land gastropods ==
Land gastropods in Nepal include:

Alycaeidae

- Alycaeus burti Godwin-Austen, 1874
- Alycaeus lohitensis Godwin-Austen, 1914
- Alycaeus yamneyensis Godwin-Austen, 1914
- Chamalycaeus bicrenatus (Godwin-Austen, 1874)
- Chamalycaeus digitatus (H.F. Blanford, 1871)
- Chamalycaeus inflatus (Godwin-Austen, 1874)
- Chamalycaeus notatus (Godwin-Austen, 1876)
- Chamalycaeus otiphorus (Benson, 1858)
- Chamalycaeus plectochilus (Benson, 1859)
- Chamalycaeus strangulatus (L. Pfeiffer, 1846)
- Chamalycaeus stylifer (Benson, 1857)
- Chamalycaeus summus (Godwin-Austen, 1914)

Cyclophoridae

- Cyclophorus fulguratus (L. Pfeiffer, 1852)
- Cyclophorus pyrotrema Benson, 1854
- Cyclophorus aurantiacus (Schumacher, 1817) - doubtful
- Theobaldius sp.
- Scabrina phaenotopicus (Benson, 1851)
- Pterocyclos cf. brahmakundensis Godwin-Austen, 1915

Diplommatinidae

- Diplommatina abiesiana Budha & Naggs, 2017
- Diplommatina boessnecki Walther & Hausdorf, 2020
- Diplommatina exserta Godwin-Austen, 1886
- Diplommatina fistulata Budha & Naggs, 2017
- Diplommatina folliculus (L. Pfeiffer, 1846)
- Diplommatina godawariensis Budha & Naggs, 2017
- Diplommatina maipokhariensis Budha & Naggs, 2017
- Diplommatina miriensis Godwin-Austen, 1917
- Diplommatina munipurensis Godwin-Austen, 1892
- Diplommatina oviformis Fulton, 1901
- Diplommatina pachycheilus Benson, 1857
- Diplommatina regularis Fulton, 1901
- Diplommatina salgharica Budha & Backeljau, 2017
- Diplommatina shivapuriensis Budha & Backeljau, 2017
- Diplommatina silvicola Godwin-Austen, 1886
- Diplommatina sperata W. T. Blanford, 1862
- Diplommatina syabrubesiensis Budha & Backeljau, 2017

Pupinidae

Gastrocoptidae

- Gastrocopta huttoniana (Benson, 1849)

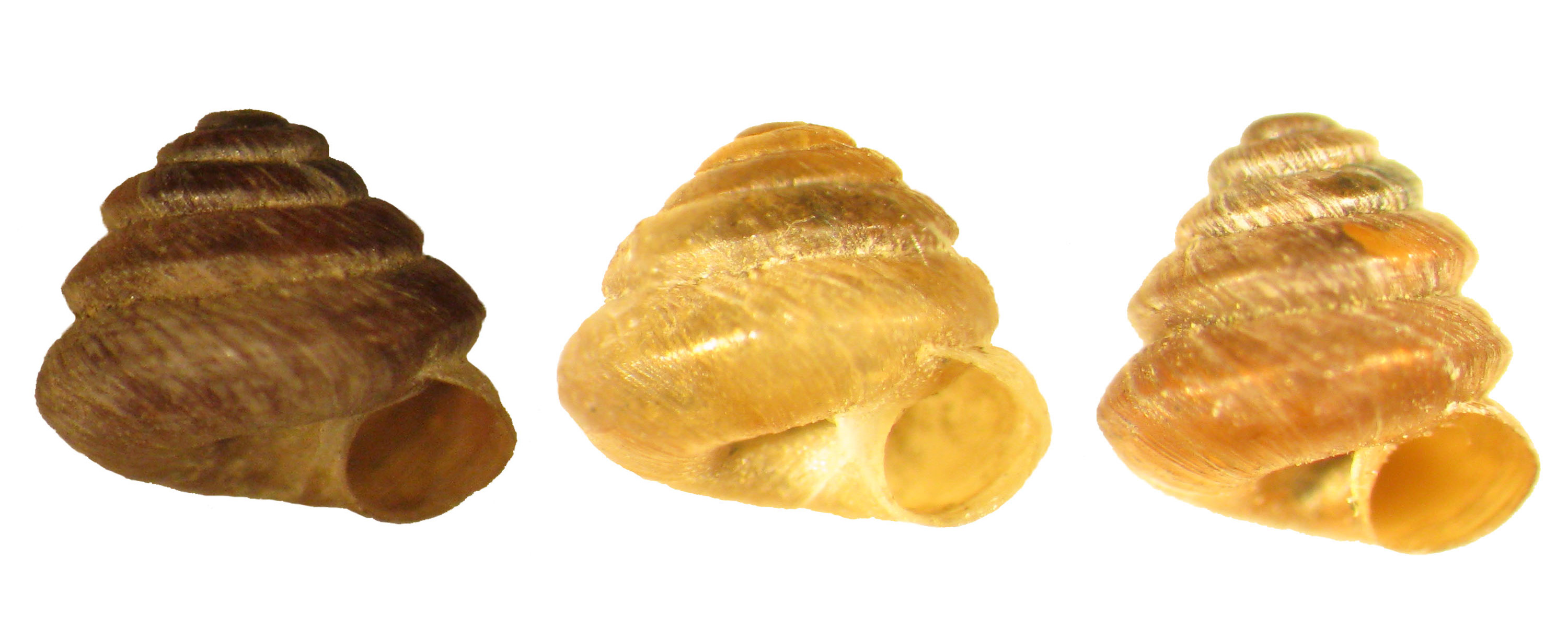
Pyramidula kuznetsovi

Pyramidulidae

- Pyramidula kuznetsovi Schileyko & Balashov, 2012

Valloniidae

- Vallonia costohimala Gerber & Bößneck, 2009
- Vallonia himalaevis Gerber & Bößneck, 2009
- Vallonia kathrinae Gerber & Bößneck, 2009
- Vallonia ladacensis (Nevill, 1878)
- Vallonia tenuilabris (Braun, 1843)

Limacidae

- Limax seticus Wiktor & Bössneck, 2004

Ariophantidae

- Khasiella pansa (Benson, 1856)
- Sarika dugasti (Morlet, 1891)

Achatinidae

- Achatina fulica (Férussac, 1821)
- Glessula orobia (Benson, 1860)
- Glessula cf. hebetata Godwin-Austen, 1920
- Glessula tamakoshi Budha & Backeljau, 2017
- Rishetia hastula (Benson, 1860)
- Rishetia kathmandica Budha & Backeljau, 2017
- Rishetia cf. mastersi Godwin-Austen, 1920
- Rishetia nagarjunensis Budha & Naggs, 2017
- Rishetia rishikeshi Budha & Naggs, 2017
- Rishetia subulata Budha & Naggs, 2017
- Rishetia tribhuvana Budha, 2017

Plectopylidae

- Endothyrella angulata Budha & Páll-Gergely, 2015
- Endothyrella dolakhaensis Budha & Páll-Gergely, 2015
- Endothyrella minor (Godwin-Austen, 1879)
- Endothyrella nepalica Budha & Páll-Gergely, 2015

Anadenidae

- Anadenus altivagus (Theobald, 1862)
- Anadenus kuznetsovi Kuzminykh & Schilyko, 2005
- Anadenus nepalensis Wiktor, 2001

== Freshwater bivalves ==
Unionidae

- Lamellidens marginalis (Lamarck, 1819)

Amblemidae

- Parreysia corrugata (O. F. Müller, 1774)
- Parreysia flavidens deltae (Benson)
- Parreysia lima Simpson, 1900

== See also ==
Lists of molluscs of surrounding countries:

- List of non-marine molluscs of China
- List of non-marine molluscs of India
