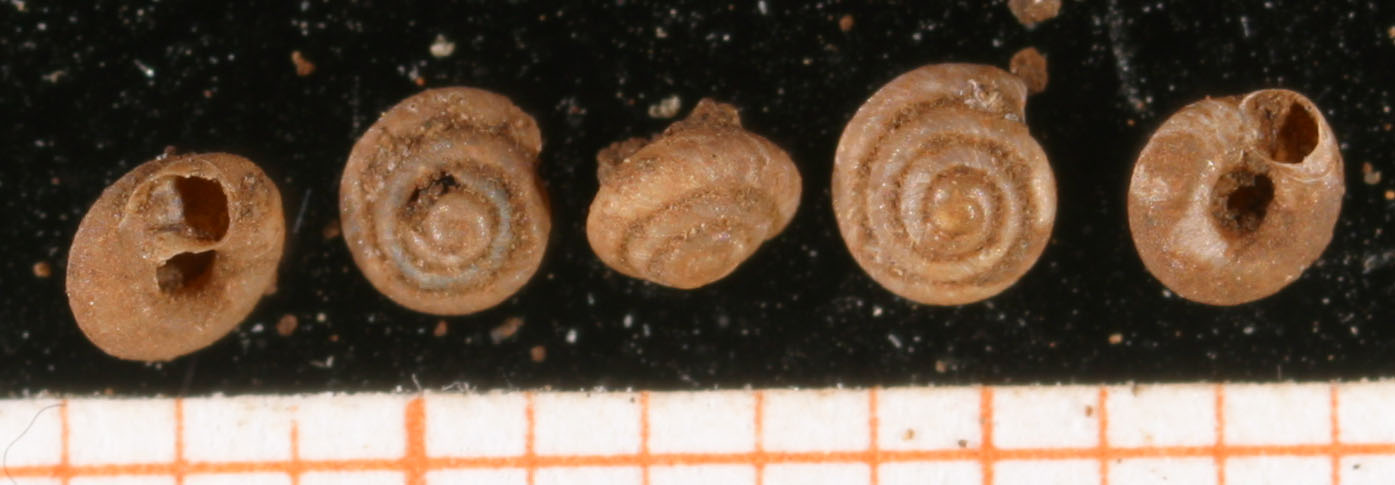
- shells of Pyramidula cephalonica

Scientific classification
- Kingdom: Animalia
- Phylum: Mollusca
- Class: Gastropoda
- Order: Stylommatophora
- Family: Pyramidulidae
- Genus: Pyramidula
- Species: P. cephalonica

Binomial name
- Pyramidula cephalonica (Westerlund, 1898)

= Pyramidula cephalonica =

Species of gastropod

Pyramidula cephalonica is a species of air-breathing land snail, a terrestrial pulmonate gastropod mollusk in the family Pyramidulidae.

== Similar species ==
The strongly flattened shell is similar to Pyramidula pusilla in terms of height/width index, but has coarser growth stripes and a wider navel.

== Characteristics ==
The right-handed shell is low-conical. It measures up to 1.8 mm in height and 2.6 mm in width. The 4½ whorls increase regularly and are separated from each other by a deep seam. They are well rounded at the periphery. The last whorl is bluntly bent at the base. The open umbilicus takes up at least a third of the shell width. The mouth is transversely ovoid and relatively small. The mouth margin is straight, folded over in the area of the umbilicus. The shell is yellowish brown. The surface of the teleoconch has clear growth stripes that can be reinforced almost like ribs. The protoconch is almost smooth.

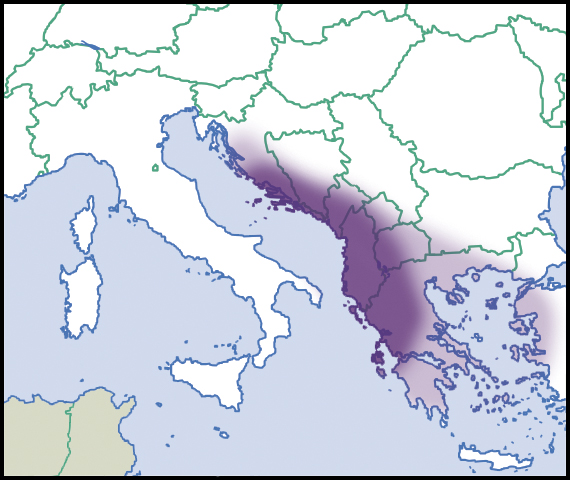
Distribution of the species.

== Distribution ==
The distribution area extends from northern Dalmatia, Bulgariato Greece and western Turkey. There they live on calcareous subsoil.
