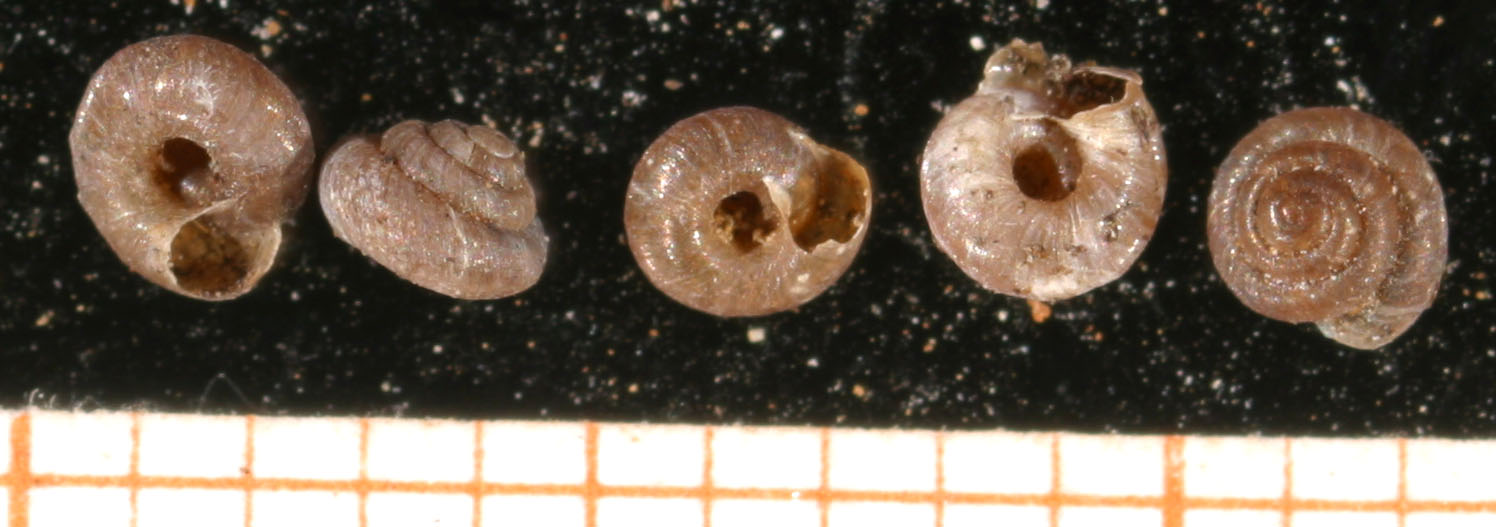
- Five shells of Pyramidula rupestris

Scientific classification
- Kingdom: Animalia
- Phylum: Mollusca
- Class: Gastropoda
- Order: Stylommatophora
- Infraorder: Pupilloidei
- Superfamily: Pupilloidea
- Family: Pyramidulidae
- Genus: Pyramidula (Fitzinger, 1833)

Synonyms
- Cratere Porro, 1838; Helix (Pyramidula) Fitzinger, 1833; Patula (Pyramidula) Fitzinger, 1833; Pyramidula (Pyramidula) Fitzinger, 1833; Pyramidula (Pyramidulops) Habe, 1956; Pyramidulops Habe, 1956

= Pyramidula (gastropod) =

Genus of gastropods

Pyramidula is a genus of very small, air-breathing land snails, terrestrial pulmonate gastropod mollusks or micromollusks in the family Pyramidulidae.

Pyramidula is the type genus of the family Pyramidulidae.

== Species ==
The type species in the genus Pyramidula is Pyramidula rupestris.

Species in the genus Pyramidula include:

- Pyramidula cephalonica (Westerlund, 1898), Balkans
- Pyramidula chorismenostoma (Westerlund & Blanc, 1879), Balkans
- Pyramidula conica Pilsbry & Hirase, 1902, Japan
- Pyramidula euomphalus (Blanford, 1861), India
- Pyramidula gracilitesta van Benthem Jutting, 1959
- Pyramidula halyi (Jousseaume, 1894), Sri Lanka
- Pyramidula humilis (Hutton, 1838), India
- Pyramidula jaenensis (Clessin, 1882), Iberian Peninsula
- Pyramidula javana (Möllendorff, 1897)
- Pyramidula kobayashii Kuroda & Hukuda, 1944
- Pyramidula kuznetsovi Schileyko & Balashov, 2012, Nepal
- Pyramidula micra Pilsbry, 1927
- Pyramidula przevalskii Lindholm 1922, northwest China
- Pyramidula pusilla (Vallot, 1801), Europe and Asia
- Pyramidula rupestris (Draparnaud, 1801), Mediterranea and maybe south of Central Asia
- Pyramidula saxatilis (Hartmann, 1842)
- † Pyramidula shantungensis Yen, 1969

Synonyms

- Pyramidula alternata (Say, 1817): synonym of Anguispira alternata (Say, 1817) (unaccepted combination)
- † Pyramidula antonini (Michaud, 1862): synonym of † Acanthinula antonini (Michaud, 1862)
- Pyramidula asteriscus (Morse, 1857): synonym of Planogyra asteriscus (Morse, 1857) (unaccepted combination)
- Pyramidula cockerelli Pilsbry, 1898: synonym of Discus shimekii (Pilsbry, 1890) (junior synonym)
- Pyramidula elrodi Pilsbry, 1900: synonym of Oreohelix elrodi (Pilsbry, 1900) (original combination)
- Pyramidula laosensis Saurin, 1953: synonym of Krobylos laosensis (Saurin, 1953) (original combination)
- † Pyramidula lecontei Stearns, 1902: synonym of † Discus lecontei (Stearns, 1902) (new combination)
- Pyramidula mamillata Andreae, 1904 †: synonym of Pleurodiscoides mamillatus (Andreae, 1904) † (new combination)
- Pyramidula patagonica Suter, 1900: synonym of Radiodiscus patagonicus (Suter, 1900)
- Pyramidula pauper (A. Gould, 1859): synonym of Discus pauper (A. Gould, 1859) (unaccepted combination)
- Pyramidula perspectiva (Say, 1817): synonym of Discus patulus (Deshayes, 1832) (junior homonym of Helix perspectiva Megerle von Mühlfeld, 1816; synonym)
- Pyramidula picta G. H. Clapp, 1920: synonym of Anguispira picta (G. H. Clapp, 1920)
- † Pyramidula ralstonensis Cockerell, 1914: synonym of † Discus ralstonensis (Cockerell, 1914) (new combination)
- Pyramidula randolphii Dall, 1895: synonym of Punctum randolphii (Dall, 1895) (original combination)
- † Pyramidula recurrecta (Oppenheim, 1890): synonym of † Pfefferiola recurrecta (Oppenheim, 1890)
- Pyramidula striatella (J. G. Anthony, 1840): synonym of Discus whitneyi (Newcomb, 1864) (junior synonym)
- Pyramidula strigosa (A. Gould, 1846): synonym of Oreohelix strigosa (A. Gould, 1846) (unaccepted combination)
- † Pyramidula subteres (Clessin, 1877): synonym of † Lucilla subteres (Clessin, 1877)
- Pyramidula umbilicata (Montague, 1803), Iberian Peninsula and British Isles: synonym of Pyramidula pusilla (Vallot, 1801) (junior subjective synonym)
