= Anguispira macneilli =

Conservation status
- Imperiled (NatureServe)

Scientific classification
- Kingdom: Animalia
- Phylum: Mollusca
- Class: Gastropoda
- Order: Stylommatophora
- Family: Discidae
- Genus: Anguispira
- Species: A. macneilli

Binomial name
- Anguispira macneilli (Walker, 1928)

Synonyms
- Anguispira alternata var. macneili B. Walker, 1928

Species of land snail

Anguispira macneilli, also known as the Tombigbee tigersnail, is a species of pulmonate land snail in the family Discidae, the disk snails. It was formerly treated as a subspecies of Anguispira alternata.

== Appearance ==
The Tombigbee tigersnail is similar to Anguispira alternata in appearance. However, its shell is smaller, more depressed, and has weaker striae. Additionally, instead of the stripes or 'flame' patterning unique to Anguispira species, it has blotchy spots that radiate outwards across the shell.

== Ecology ==
The Tombigbee tigersnail is endemic to the coastal plains of Alabama. Its range and habitat overlaps with Anguispira alternata, and the two species can occasionally be found together.
