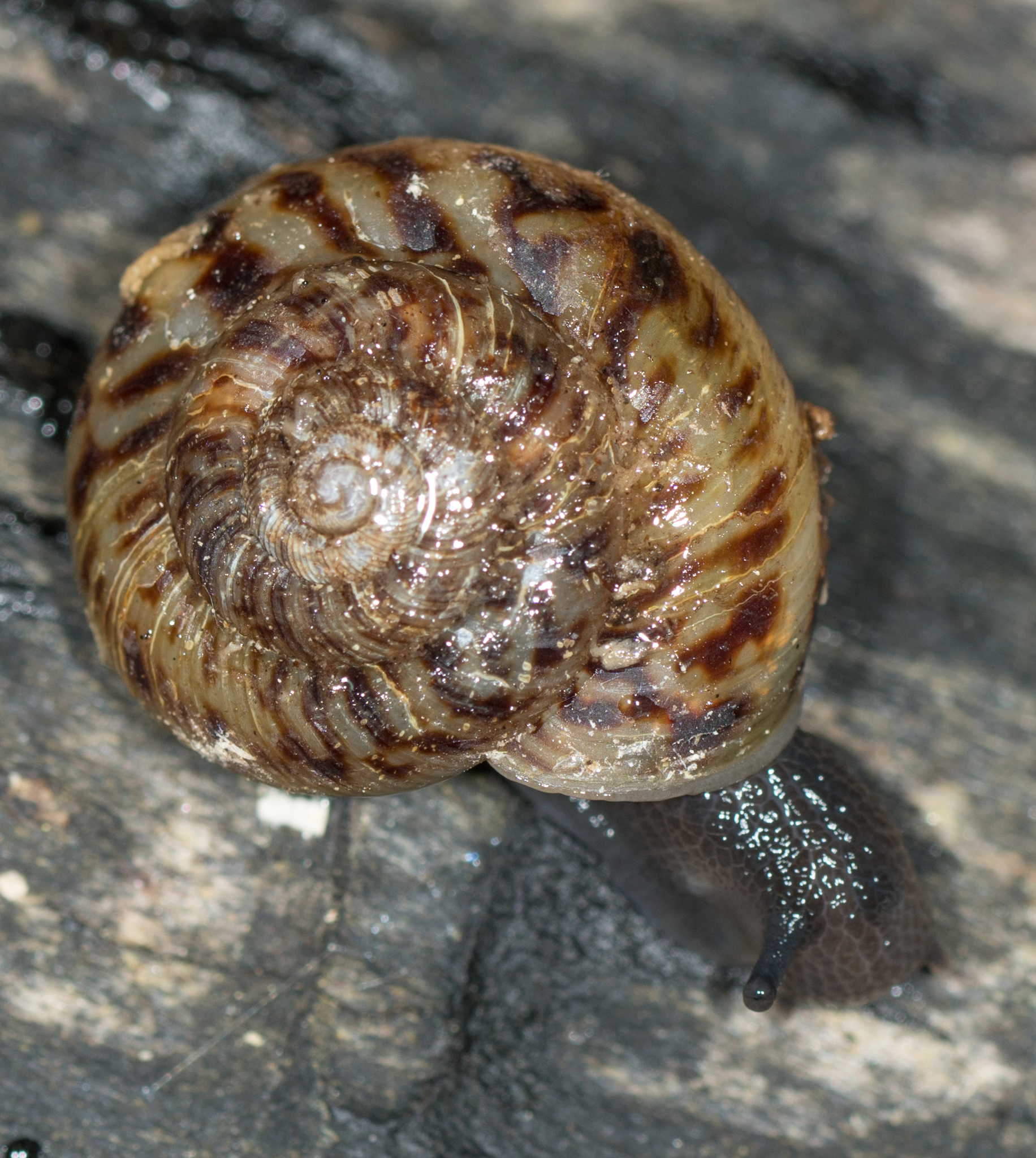
- A mature coastal plain tigersnail found in Virginia

Conservation status
- Apparently Secure (NatureServe)

Scientific classification
- Kingdom: Animalia
- Phylum: Mollusca
- Class: Gastropoda
- Order: Stylommatophora
- Family: Discidae
- Genus: Anguispira
- Species: A. fergusoni

Binomial name
- Anguispira fergusoni (Bland, 1862)

Synonyms
- Anguispira alternata fergusoni (Bland, 1862); Helix alternata fergusoni (Bland, 1862); Pyramidula alternata fergusoni (Bland, 1862); Anguispira clarki (Vanatta, 1924)

= Anguispira fergusoni =

Species of land snail

Anguispira fergusoni, also known as the coastal plain tigersnail or coastal plain disk, is a species of pulmonate land snail in the family Discidae, the disk snails. It is found in multiple states along the east coast of the United States.

== Appearance ==
The shell of the coastal plain tigersnail is heliciform in shape, and slightly flattened. It is fairly smooth and glossy, with minimal striation, and ranges from 15 to 18 mm in diameter. The shell is typically pale yellow in color and covered in brown or dark red splotches that radiate outwards across the snail's whorls.

This snail is most visually similar to Anguispira alternata. However, its shell is typically smaller, its whorls are rounder, and its mucus secretions are clear compared to the saffron-colored mucus of A. alternata.

== Ecology ==
Populations of coastal plain tigersnail have been located in South Carolina, North Carolina, Virginia, Maryland, Pennsylvania, New Jersey, and New York. It is listed as critically endangered in Pennsylvania, near threatened in Virginia, and least concern in North Carolina.

The coastal plain tigersnail is endemic to the east coast of the United States, specifically the Atlantic Coastal Plain. The species has gradually moved up through the floodplains of larger rivers into the interior of the Piedmont region. As its name suggests, populations are found in coastal plains, around the fall line. Within these plains, snails are typically found around or in rotting logs, hollow trees, or in the leaf litter in deciduous forested areas. They may form large clusters or colonies of individuals around large senescent trees with trunk cavities. Populations have also been located in urban environments like the New York metro area.

In 2008, the snail was discovered to be preyed on by the larvae of the parastitic sciomyzid fly Pherbellia albovaria.
