= Calogoniodiscus =

Calogoniodiscus Temporal range: Tertiary

Scientific classification
- Kingdom: Animalia
- Phylum: Mollusca
- Class: Gastropoda
- Order: Stylommatophora
- Family: Discidae
- Genus: †Calogoniodiscus; Pfeffer, 1929

Species
- †Calogoniodiscus elegans Yu, 1982; †Calogoniodiscus perelegans (Deshayes) (type)

Extinct genus of gastropods

Calogoniodiscus is an extinct genus of gastropods in the family Discidae.

Calogoniodiscus is also considered a subgenus of Discus.
