= Pyramidula jaenensis =

Scientific classification
- Kingdom: Animalia
- Phylum: Mollusca
- Class: Gastropoda
- Order: Stylommatophora
- Family: Pyramidulidae
- Genus: Pyramidula
- Species: P. jaenensis

Binomial name
- Pyramidula jaenensis (Clessin, 1882)

Synonyms
- Helix (Patula) jaenensis Clessin, 1882

Species of gastropod

Pyramidula umbilicata is a species of air-breathing land snail, a terrestrial pulmonate gastropod mollusk in the family Pyramidulidae.

== Shell description ==
The width of the shell is up to 2.2 mm, the height is up to 2.7 mm.

== Distribution ==
This species occurs in:

- Spain - in the south of the Iberian Peninsula
- southern Portugal (according to Gittenberger 1996, but not mentioned in later article by Martínez-Ortí 2007)
