= Anguispira nimapuna =

Conservation status
- Critically Imperiled (NatureServe)

Scientific classification
- Kingdom: Animalia
- Phylum: Mollusca
- Class: Gastropoda
- Order: Stylommatophora
- Family: Discidae
- Genus: Anguispira
- Species: A. nimapuna

Binomial name
- Anguispira nimapuna H.B.Baker, 1932

Species of land snail

Anguispira nimapuna, also known as the nimapuna or nimapu tigersnail, is a rare, range-restricted species of pulmonate land snail endemic to north-central Idaho. The species is listed as critically endangered in the United States.

== Appearance ==
The nimapuna tigersnail possesses a thin, ribbed, angular shell that ranges from 11 to 12 mm (0.43 to 0.47 in) in diameter. The shell ranges from olive-brown to straw-brown in color, and is defined by faint, dark stripes. It is described as having a greenish tinge that is more obvious in juveniles.

== Ecology ==
The nimapuna tigersnail is the only full species in the Anguispira genus found west of the Rocky Mountains. Its range is incredibly narrow, with established populations only being found in a small portion of the Clearwater River drainage where the Lochsa and Selway Rivers meet and form a valley in Idaho. It is also known from a single shell found in Wallawa County, Oregon.

Andrew Rankin claims that the current population in Idaho may be a potential relict population that has persisted in the Clearwater drainage due to its lack of glaciation during the last Pleistocene ice age. The populations then did not re-colonize areas outside the drainage following the ice's retreat. This hypothesis aligns with current findings that show that the area serves as a refugium for a number of other rare, narrow-ranged endemics such as Constance's bittercress and the Idaho giant salamander.

The nimapuna tigersnail is found between 1,500 and 2,550 ft (460 and 780 m) in elevation along talus slopes in mixed mesic forests. Individuals are often found around rivers, but not in areas that flood regularly. They are often found under or on fallen wood, under bryophyte mats, among dense ferns, or in leaf litter. In summer and winter, snails may retreat deep into talus refugia to protect themselves from desiccation, freezing, and predators.

== Threats ==
Nimapuna tigersnail populations are likely in severe decline due to habitat destruction and alteration. Livestock grazing, logging, talus removal, fire suppression, and road construction and maintenance are cited as the most imminent threats to the species' survival. The issue is likely exacerbated by the snail's limited range and its low (or nonexistent) rates of colonization.
