= Marbled disc =

Conservation status
- Vulnerable (IUCN 2.3)

- Critically Imperiled (NatureServe)

Scientific classification
- Kingdom: Animalia
- Phylum: Mollusca
- Class: Gastropoda
- Order: Stylommatophora
- Family: Discidae
- Genus: Discus
- Species: D. marmorensis

Binomial name
- Discus marmorensis H. B. Baker, 1932

Species of gastropod

Discus marmorensis, common name marbled disc, is a species of small, air-breathing, land snail, a terrestrial pulmonate gastropod mollusk in the family Discidae, the disk snails. This species is endemic to the United States.
