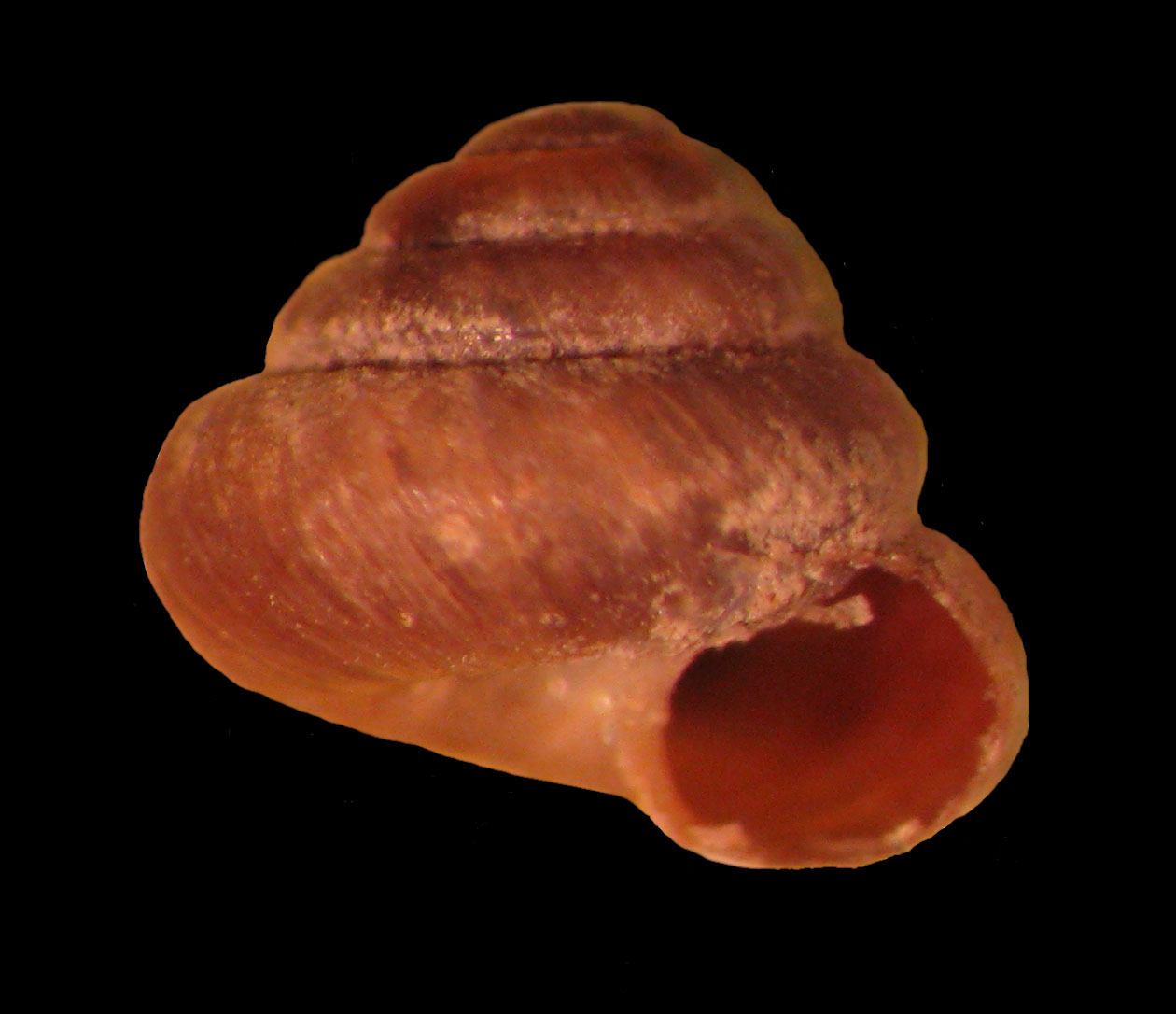
- Paralectotype of P. przevalskii in collection of Zoological Museum of Moscow University

Scientific classification
- Kingdom: Animalia
- Phylum: Mollusca
- Class: Gastropoda
- Order: Stylommatophora
- Family: Pyramidulidae
- Genus: Pyramidula
- Species: P. przevalskii

Binomial name
- Pyramidula przevalskii Lindholm, 1922

= Pyramidula przevalskii =

Species of gastropod

Pyramidula przevalskii is a species of air-breathing land snail, a terrestrial pulmonate gastropod mollusk in the family Pyramidulidae.

== Shell description ==
The diameter of the shell is up to 3.25 mm, the height is up to 3.0 mm at 4.5 whorls.

== Distribution ==
This species is known only from one location in Keriya (Hotan, China). The type series was collected by Nikolay Przhevalsky in 1885. There are currently (2012) no other findings.
