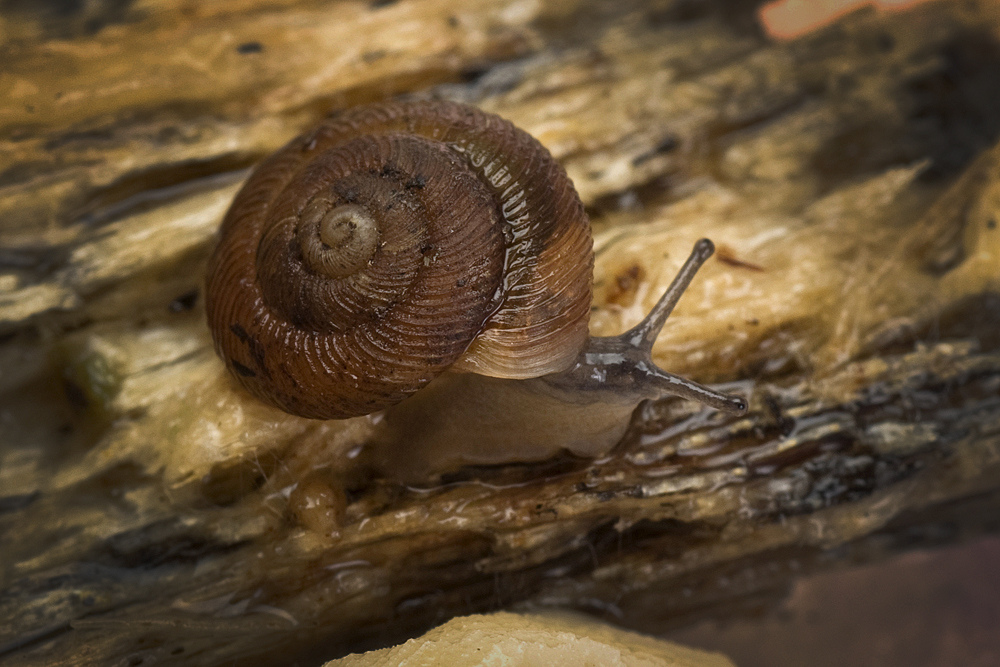
- Live Discus catskillensis

Conservation status
- Secure (NatureServe)

Scientific classification
- Kingdom: Animalia
- Phylum: Mollusca
- Class: Gastropoda
- Order: Stylommatophora
- Family: Discidae
- Genus: Discus
- Species: D. catskillensis

Binomial name
- Discus catskillensis (Pilsbry, 1896)

= Discus catskillensis =

Species of gastropod

Discus catskillensis, common name angular disc, is a species of small air-breathing land snail, a terrestrial gastropod mollusk in the family Discidae, the disk snails.

== Ecology ==
=== Habitat ===
Discus catskillensis is found in cooler climates and moist deciduous forests, at wooded ridges and slopes, around logs, stumps, rock talus, and dead leaves, or in small openings, in hedgerows, farms, yards and old fields where there is cover.

=== Range ===
It is native to the northeastern United States, particularly the Catskill Mountains and surrounding regions. It is rated by NatureServe as Secure in New Brunswick, Apparently Secure in Ontario and Manitoba, Vulnerable in Virginia and Pennsylvania, Critically Imperiled in West Virginia and Maryland, and Presumed Extirpated in Kentucky, Indiana and Mississippi.

=== Diet ===
Like other members of the family Discidae, this snail feeds on fungi and decomposing plant material, playing a small but important role in forest nutrient cycling.
