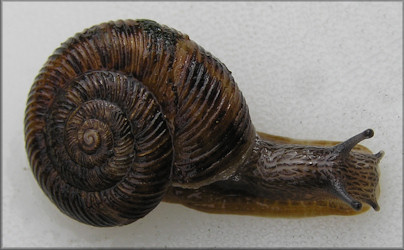
- A mature southeastern tigersnail found in Florida

Conservation status
- Secure (NatureServe)

Scientific classification
- Kingdom: Animalia
- Phylum: Mollusca
- Class: Gastropoda
- Order: Stylommatophora
- Family: Discidae
- Genus: Anguispira
- Species: A. strongylodes

Binomial name
- Anguispira strongylodes (Pfeiffer, 1854)

Synonyms
- Helix strongylodes (Reeve, 1854); Helix alternata rarinotata (Pilsbry, 1900)

= Anguispira strongylodes =

Species of land snail

Anguispira strongylodes, also known as the southeastern tigersnail, is a species of pulmonate land snail in the family Discidae, the disk snails.

== Appearance ==
The southeastern tigersnail's shell is coarsely striated and roughly 18 millimetres (0.71 in) in width and 10 millimetres (0.39 in) in height. It is visually similar to close relative Anguispira alternata, although it tends to be slightly larger and its splotches are smaller. The snail's splotches are chestnut-brown in color and the base of the shell ranges from brown to buff in color. There are no radiating streaks on the underside of the shell.

== Ecology ==
The southeastern tigersnail has a wide range covering fifteen states. It extends from Texas in the west to North Carolina in the east, and from Florida in the south to Illinois in the north. It is presumed extirpated from Virginia and is listed as imperiled in North Carolina and West Virginia.

The southeastern tigersnail is most commonly found in high-elevation hardwood forests, particularly late-successional oak-cedar forests. They are associated with limestone outcrops on steep hillsides or slopes adjacent to rivers. They may be found on or around rock formations or in leaf litter. They prefer neutral soils.
