= Anguispira russelli =

Scientific classification
- Kingdom: Animalia
- Phylum: Mollusca
- Class: Gastropoda
- Order: Stylommatophora
- Family: Discidae
- Genus: Anguispira
- Species: A. russelli

Binomial name
- Anguispira russelli Tozer, 1956

Extinct species of land snail

Anguispira russelli was a species of pulmonate land snail in the family Discidae, the disk snails. The species is only known from fossilized specimens. It is named after L.S. Russell, former Director of Zoology at the National Museum of Canada.

== Fossils ==
The most well-studied and well-documented A. russelli fossil was found by paleontologist Edward Tozer in 1956. It was located in Paskapoo formation in western Canada, dating the shell to the Paleocene.

== Physical appearance ==
The fossil gathered by Tozer is 14 mm (0.55 in) in width and 7 mm (0.28 in) in height. The shell is a depressed heliciform in shape with 5 whorls that gradually increase in size from the umbilicus and a thin outer lip. The shell is rounded and coarsely striate, with the umbilicus taking up 1/3 of the shell.
