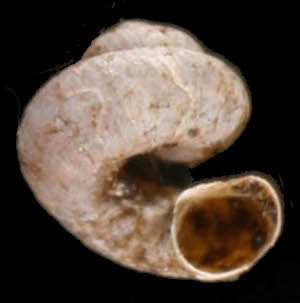
- An apertural view of a shell of Pyramidula chorismenostoma

Scientific classification
- Kingdom: Animalia
- Phylum: Mollusca
- Class: Gastropoda
- Order: Stylommatophora
- Family: Pyramidulidae
- Genus: Pyramidula
- Species: P. chorismenostoma

Binomial name
- Pyramidula chorismenostoma (Westerlund & Blanc, 1879)

Synonyms
- Helix (Patula) rupestris chorismenostoma Westerlund & Blanc, 1879; Pyramidula rupestris chorismenostoma

= Pyramidula chorismenostoma =

Species of land snail

Pyramidula chorismenostoma is a species of very small air-breathing land snail, a terrestrial pulmonate gastropod mollusk or micromollusk in the family Pyramidulidae.

== Shell description ==
The normal condition of the shell of this species is scalarid, i.e. the whorls of the shell are not attached to one another. This shell type is unique among the non-marine malacofauna of Europe.

The width of the shell is up to 2.2 mm, the height is up to 3.1 mm.

== Distribution ==
This species occurs in countries and islands including:

- Greece: approximately the southern 2/3 of Greece, Crete, and the Aegean islands.
- Western Turkey
