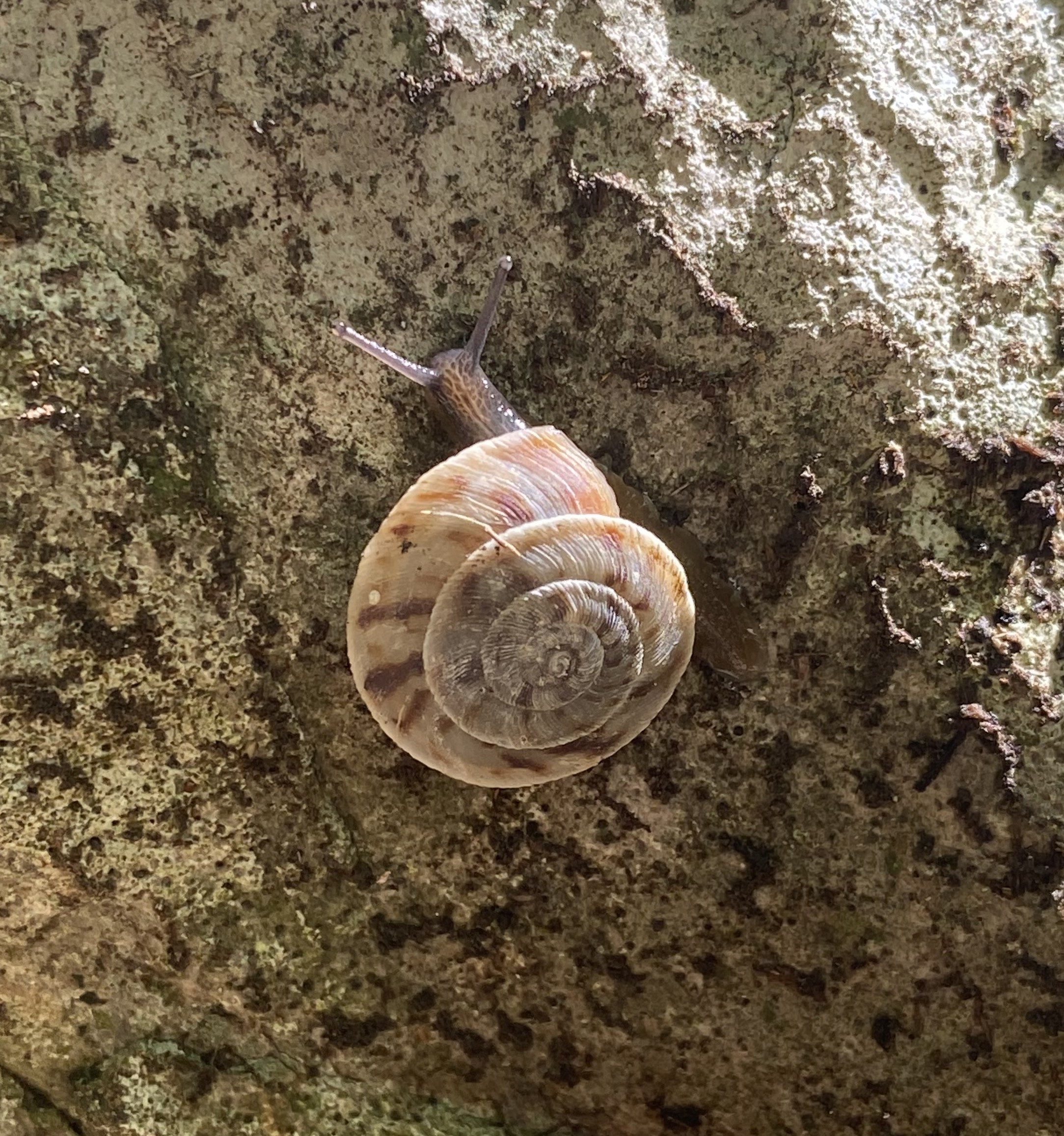
- A live individual in situ, found in Tennessee.

Conservation status
- Data Deficient (IUCN 2.3)

- Critically Imperiled (NatureServe)

Scientific classification
- Kingdom: Animalia
- Phylum: Mollusca
- Class: Gastropoda
- Order: Stylommatophora
- Family: Discidae
- Genus: Anguispira
- Species: A. picta

Binomial name
- Anguispira picta (G. H. Clapp, 1920)

= Painted snake-coiled forest snail =

Species of gastropod

Anguispira picta, common names painted snake-coiled forest snail and painted tigersnail, is a rare species of air-breathing land snail, a terrestrial pulmonate gastropod mollusk in the family Discidae, the disc snails. It is a limestone specialist, and is limited to outcrops with suitable mineralogy.

A. picta was first discovered in 1906. It was once treated as a subspecies of the more common Anguispira cumberlandiana, but it is now regarded as a unique species. This species is native to the Cumberland Plateau in Tennessee, and is currently only found in Franklin County. It may possibly also occur just over the border in Alabama, although populations have not yet been located. The U.S. Fish and Wildlife Service has federally listed the species as threatened.

== Appearance ==
A picta possesses a depressed dome-shaped shell with 6 whorls and a nearly smooth white carina. The base of the shell is pale, usually cream in color, and defined by brown or chestnut blotches that radiate outwards along the whorls. Adults typically range from 17–21 millimetres (0.67–0.83 in) in width and 9–10 millimetres (0.35–0.39 in) in height. The shell of A. picta is notably less compressed and striated than other limestone specialists such as Anguispira cumberlandiana and Anguispira alabama.

== Ecology ==
A picta was long thought to be endemic to one cove on the edge of the Cumberland Plateau, near the town of Sherwood, Tennessee along the Crow Creek drainage. The cove is heavily forested (hardwood dominant) and studded with large limestone outcrops. The snail still occurs at this cove and is abundant there. Recent surveys demonstrate that its distribution extends a few miles past the cove. Until recently, its entire distribution was located on privately owned land. In 2018, a land grant to the Sherwood Forest, part of South Cumberland State Park, included one-third of the snail's known range, and is now a protected area.

Like some other members of the Anguispira genus, A. picta is a limestone specialist. Snails have rarely been observed on any other habitat besides limestone, and when they were, outcrops were always in the immediate area. The presence of Monteagle limestone, a type of limestone found only in the Cumberland Plateau region, may be a potential prerequisite for A. picta habitation. Since Monteagle limestone is not the dominant geologic formation in the surrounding area, A. picta may be prevented from expanding its range.

== Threats ==
Threats to the species include residential development, which can alter the habitat indirectly by adding polluted surface runoff into waterways. There is active limestone quarrying in the area, which can destroy habitat and cause habitat fragmentation. Logging also removes forest cover; the snail can apparently tolerate some degree of deforestation, but the long-term impacts on its survival are not yet known.
