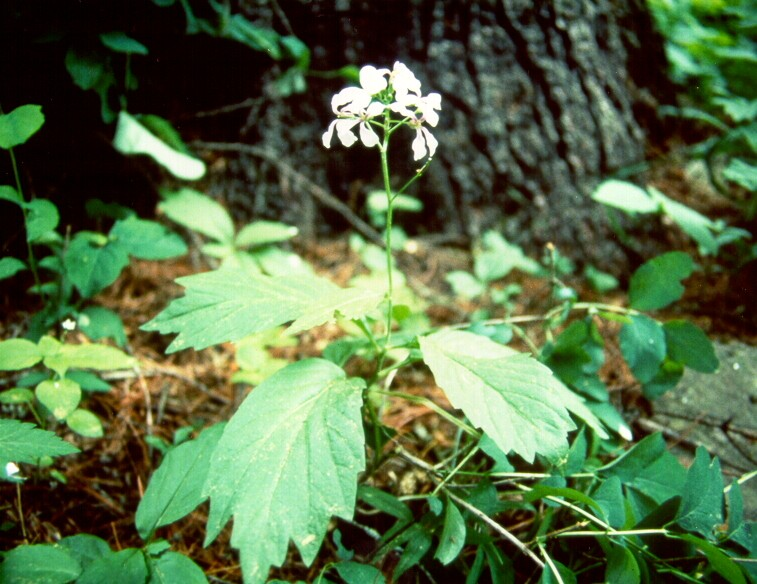

Conservation status
- Vulnerable (NatureServe)

Scientific classification
- Kingdom: Plantae
- Clade: Tracheophytes
- Clade: Angiosperms
- Clade: Eudicots
- Clade: Rosids
- Order: Brassicales
- Family: Brassicaceae
- Genus: Cardamine
- Species: C. constancei

Binomial name
- Cardamine constancei Detling

= Cardamine constancei =

Species of flowering plant

Cardamine constancei is a rare, narrow-ranged species of perennial rhizomatous forb known by the common name Constance's bittercress. It is endemic to select tributaries of the Clearwater and Coeur d'Alene Rivers in Idaho.

== Description ==
Constance's bittercress has an erect, unbranched stem ranging from 1 to 1.5 mm (0.039 to 0.059 in) in diameter; it ranges from glabrous to sparsely hairy. It has four to seven cauline leaves that are typically ovate in shape with serrated edges and a cuneate base. Leaves range from 5 to 13 cm (2.0 to 5.1 in) in length and 20 to 65 mm (0.79 to 2.56 in) in width. The flowers are pink or white with oblanceolate petals that range from 15 to 28 mm (0.59 to 1.10 in) in length and 5 to 8 mm (0.20 to 0.31 in) in width. The fruits are linear and 2.5 to 3.5 cm (0.98 to 1.38 in) in length and 1.9 to 2.1 mm (0.075 to 0.083 in) in width.

The plant flowers from May to June.

== Range and habitat ==
Constance's bittercress is endemic to the Clearwater Mountain range in north-central Idaho. Populations have been found around the North and Middle Forks of the Clearwater River and throughout the Selway, Coeur d'Alene, and St. Joe River canyons in Clearwater, Idaho, Kootenai, Nez Perce, and Shoshone Counties in Idaho. It is most commonly found around the Selway River. The species is fairly abundant throughout its limited range, but is sensitive to human disturbance. The ability of the plant to spread and set seed is limited by soil moisture levels.

This species is most often found in moist, low-elevation (400–600 ft (120–180 m)) mixed coniferous forests along rivers, specifically in the redcedar/maidenhair fern habitat type. It is tolerant of light disturbance and appears to favor shaded to partly open habitat, wooded creek bottoms, and hillsides. Flowering is rare and mainly occurs in plants in canopy openings; it will usually not flower in dense shade.

Contsance's bittercress only occurs in a known refugium for a number of rare, narrow-ranged endemics such as the Idaho giant salamander and nimapuna tigersnail. The canyons where the plant currently grows were not glaciated during the last Pleistocene ice age, and its range does not extend into canyons that were previously glaciated. Brunsfeld and Sullivan propose that the plant's current range is a relict population that became isolated in the canyons during the last ice age, and has subsequently not re-colonized its former range.

== Threats ==
Constance's bittercress is threatened by human habitat modification, specifically mining, road building, logging, and decades of fire suppression. Its narrow range and specific habitat requirements have the potential to exacerbate the negative effects of human activities. As a result, the species is listed as vulnerable both at a federal and state level.
