= Pherbellia seticoxa =

Scientific classification
- Kingdom: Animalia
- Phylum: Arthropoda
- Class: Insecta
- Order: Diptera
- Family: Sciomyzidae
- Genus: Pherbellia
- Species: P. seticoxa

Binomial name
- Pherbellia seticoxa Steyskal, 1961

Species of fly

Pherbellia seticoxa is a species of marsh fly (insects in the family Sciomyzidae).
