= Anguispira alabama =

Conservation status
- Imperiled (NatureServe)

Scientific classification
- Kingdom: Animalia
- Phylum: Mollusca
- Class: Gastropoda
- Order: Stylommatophora
- Family: Discidae
- Genus: Anguispira
- Species: A. alabama

Binomial name
- Anguispira alabama (G.H. Clapp, 1920)

Synonyms
- Anguispira cumberlandiana alabama (Pilsbry, 1948)

Species of gastropod

Anguispira alabama, also known as the Alabama tigersnail or Alabama disc, is a rare, range-restricted species of pulmonate land snail found in Alabama and Tennessee. Due to its rarity and the difficulty of locating new populations, the species is listed as vulnerable in both states.

== Physical appearance ==
The Alabama tigersnail possesses a pale, convex shell with radiating brown stripes and a white, heavily ribbed carina. Its stripes are noted as being darker than those of its close relative, Anguispira cumberlandiana. The shell is typically 21.75-21.25 mm in diameter. It is pinched and thin, which allows the snail to burrow into cracks in limestone cliffs and boulders to presumably hibernate and seek shelter from the elements.

== Ecology ==
The Alabama tigersnail is found in eight counties in Alabama and Tennessee along the Cumberland Plateau. Like Anguispira cumberlandiana and Anguispira picta, it is a limestone specialist. Though studies on this species are limited, Alabama tigersnails have been mainly found on or around limestone cliffs, talus, and boulders in moist, dense, hardwood-dominant forests.
