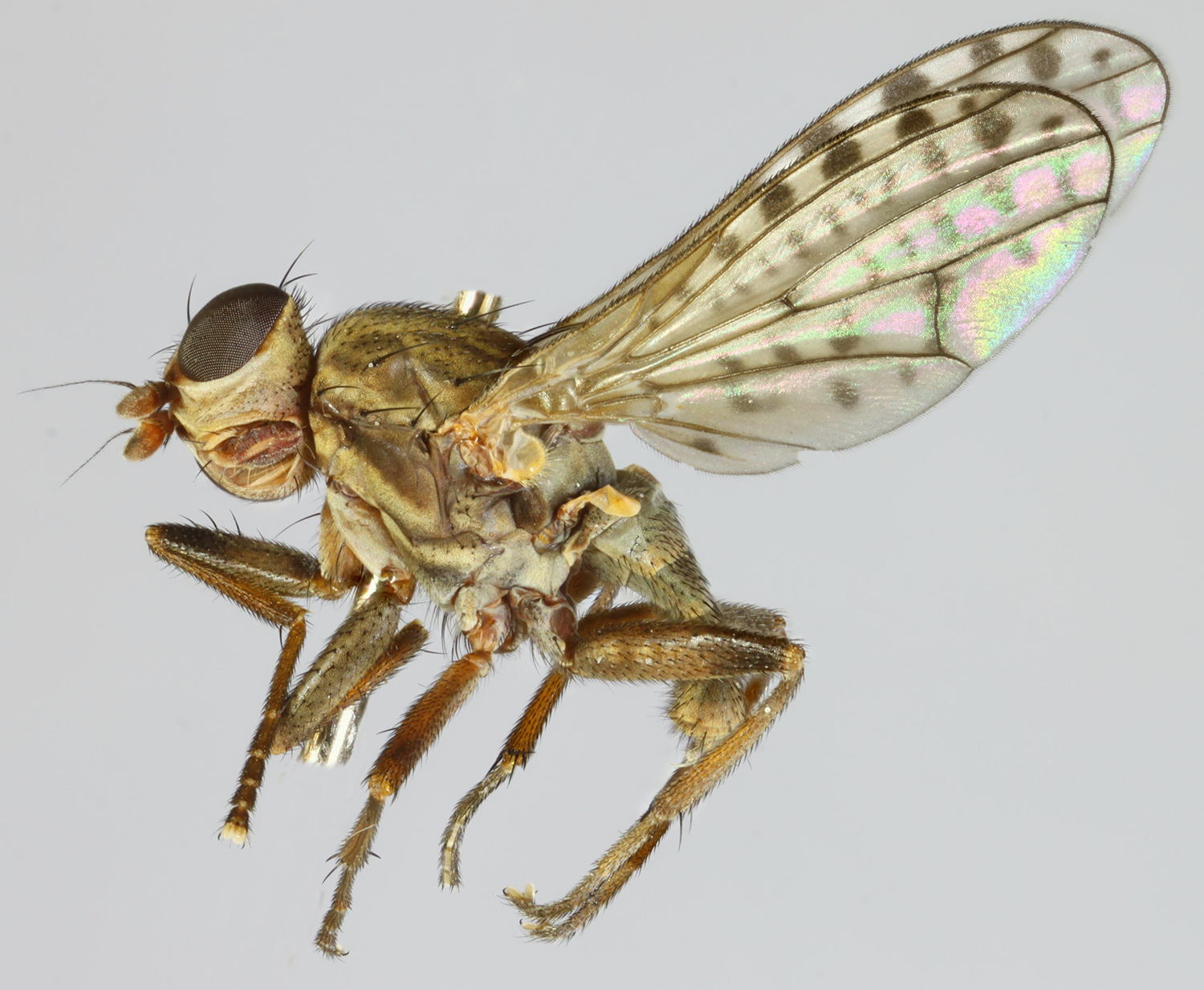
- Pherbellia schoenherri North Wales. Note the maculated wings.

Scientific classification
- Kingdom: Animalia
- Phylum: Arthropoda
- Class: Insecta
- Order: Diptera
- Family: Sciomyzidae
- Genus: Pherbellia
- Species: P. schoenherri

Binomial name
- Pherbellia schoenherri (Fallén, 1826)

= Pherbellia schoenherri =

Species of fly

Pherbellia schoenherri is a species of fly in the family Sciomyzidae. It is found in the Palearctic .4-5 mm. long. In schoenherri the grey ocellar plate is extended in a narrow triangle almost to the antenna base. The prescutellar acrostichal bristles are reduced or absent.The costal vein of the patterned wings are equipped with a series of protruding spinules distinct from the bristles. The females lay eggs on the shells of Succineidae including Succinea putris. The resultant larvae consume the animal and pupate within the shell. P. schoenherri is a very common and widespread species with a very long flight period. It flies mainly from April to October, but in most European countries, it occurs all year round and in a very wide variety of both dry and moist habitats.
