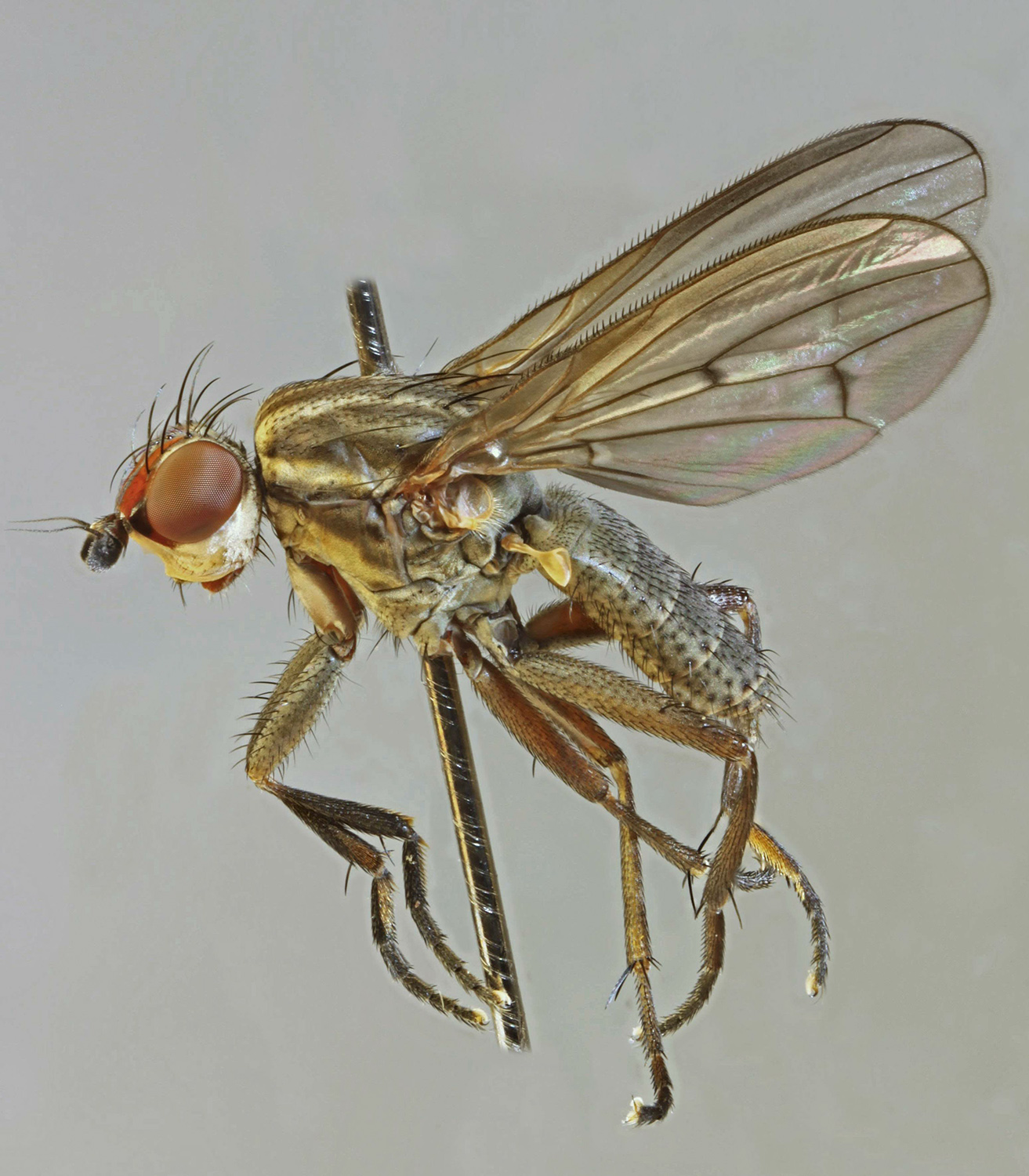
- Pherbellia cinerella North Wales

Scientific classification
- Kingdom: Animalia
- Phylum: Arthropoda
- Class: Insecta
- Order: Diptera
- Family: Sciomyzidae
- Genus: Pherbellia
- Species: P. cinerella

Binomial name
- Pherbellia cinerella (Fallén, 1820)

= Pherbellia cinerella =

Species of fly

Pherbellia cinerella is a species of fly in the family Sciomyzidae. It is found in the Palearctic. P. cinerella is a dark and very characteristic Pherbellia and easy to recognise in the field by its long mid-frontal stripe and darkened anterior wing margin. The larva is predatory on a variety of terrestrial and aquatic snails including Helicidae, Galba truncatula, Helix, Helicella, Succinea and Lymnaea.There is little or no host preference. It is found in a wide range of habitats but it is most often found in warm and dry habitats such as coastal dunes and calcareous grassland where it can reach high numbers. It is also encountered in moist vegetation though in lesser numbers. It is a potential biological control agent.
