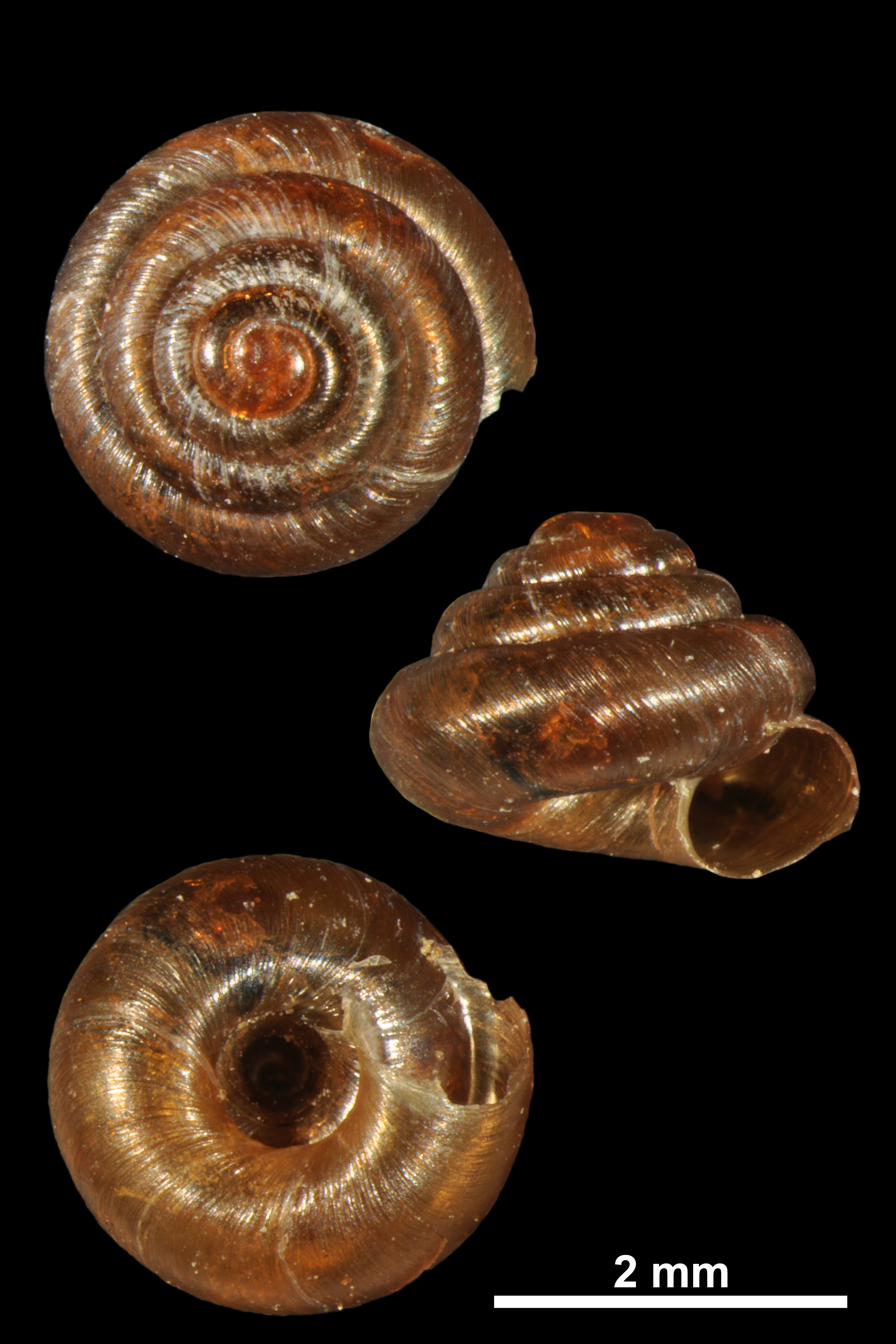
- Shell of Pyramidula pusilla (specimen at MNHN, Paris)

Scientific classification
- Domain: Eukaryota
- Kingdom: Animalia
- Phylum: Mollusca
- Class: Gastropoda
- Order: Stylommatophora
- Family: Pyramidulidae
- Genus: Pyramidula
- Species: P. pusilla

Binomial name
- Pyramidula pusilla (Vallot, 1801)

Synonyms
- Helix pusilla Vallot, 1801 · unaccepted (original combination); Helix spirula A. Villa & J. B. Villa, 1841 · unaccepted (junior synonym); Helix umbilicata Montagu, 1803 · unaccepted (original name); Pyramidula umbilicata (Montagu, 1803) · unaccepted > junior subjective synonym

= Pyramidula pusilla =

Species of gastropod

Pyramidula pusilla is a species of very small air-breathing land snail, a terrestrial pulmonate gastropod mollusk or micromollusk in the family Pyramidulidae.

== Shell description ==
The width of the shell is up to 2.95 mm, the height is up to 2.25 mm. The shell has a low conical shape, broader than high. It is and tightly coiled. The apical whorls regularly increase. The umbilicus is 1/4 of the diameter (in some Spain localities 1/3). The growth lines are fine and narrow, sometimes weak. The colour is red brown becoming more grey with age.

== Distribution ==
The geographical distribution of this species is mainly Mediterranean: western and central Europe, southeastern Europe, Caucasus, Central Asia and probably the Russian Far East.

Europe (not a complete list):

  - Great Britain
  - Ireland
  - Spain
  - Portugal
  - France - in Pyrenees
  - Belgium
  - Luxembourg
  - Liechtenstein
  - Germany
  - Austria
  - Hungary
  - Bulgaria
  - Czech Republic
  - Slovakia
  - Poland
  - Ukraine - in Carpathians, Podolian Upland and Crimean Mountains

Southwestern Asia (not a complete list):

  - Russia - in Caucasus
  - Georgia
  - Armenia
  - Azerbaijan
  - Israel

Central Asia:

  - Kazakhstan
  - Uzbekistan
  - Turkmenistan
  - Tajikistan
