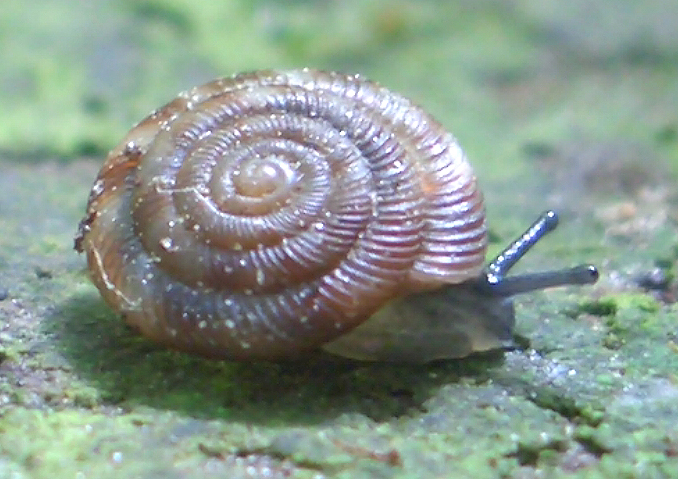
- A live Discus rotundatus
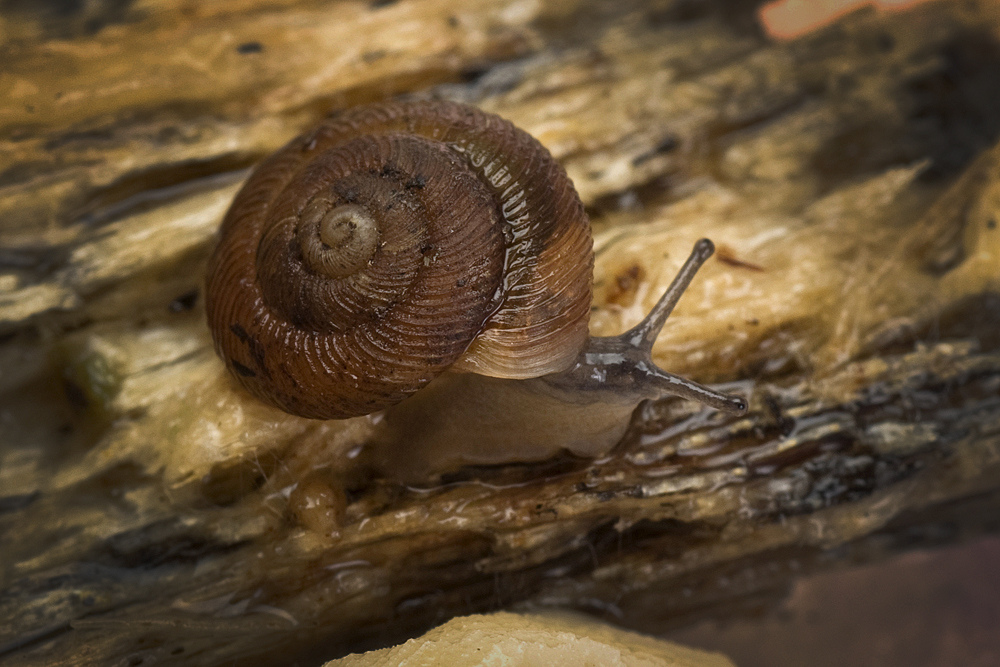
- A live Discus catskillensis

Scientific classification
- Kingdom: Animalia
- Phylum: Mollusca
- Class: Gastropoda
- Order: Stylommatophora
- Family: Discidae
- Genus: Discus; Fitzinger, 1833

Synonyms
- Allerya Bourguignat, 1878; Delomphalus Charpentier, 1837; Eyryomphala H.Beck, 1837; Goniodiscus; Gonyodiscus Fitzinger, 1833; Patula Held, 1838; Patularia Clessin, 1876

= Discus (gastropod) =

Genus of gastropods

Discus is a genus of small air-breathing land snails, terrestrial pulmonate gastropod mollusks in the family Discidae, the disk snails.

== Distribution ==
Distribution of the genus Discus include Europe, northern Asia and North America. The former subgenus Canaridiscus from the Canary Islands off North Africa, which was previously allocated to Atlantica, is now raised to a full genus.

== Description ==
Discus species have small or medium shells with ribs. The umbilicus is wide.

== Species ==
Species in this genus include:

subgenus Discus Fitzinger, 1833

- Discus ruderatus Férussac, 1821 – type species
- Discus whitneyi (Newcomb, 1864) – Forest disc

subgenus Gonyodiscus Fitzinger, 1833

- Discus brunsoni Berry, 1955 – Lake disc
- Discus marmorensis H. B. Baker, 1932 – Marbled disc
- Discus perspectivus J. C. M. von Mühlfeld, 1816
- Discus rotundatus (O. F. Müller, 1774) – rotund disc

subgenus ?

- Discus bryanti (Harper, 1881) – saw-tooth disc, sawtooth disc
- Discus catskillensis (Pilsbry, 1896) – angular disc
- Discus clappi (Pilsbry, 1924) – channelled disc
- Discus macclintocki F. C. Baker, 1928 – Iowa pleistocene snail, Pleistocene disc
- Discus nigrimontanus Pilsbry, 1924 – Black Mountain disc
- Discus patulus (G. P. Deshayes, 1830) – domed disc
- Discus selenitoides (Pilsbry, 1890) – file disc
- Discus shimekii (Pilsbry, 1890) – striate disc

Species brought into synonymy

- Discus alternata: synonym of Anguispira alternata (superseded combination)
- Discus cronkhitei: synonym of Discus whitneyi (junior subjective synonym)
- Discus gomerensis: synonym of Canaridiscus gomerensis
- Discus laurisilvae: synonym of Canaridiscus laurisilvae
- Discus orientalus: synonym of Calogoniodiscus orientalus (superseded combination)
- Discus perelegans: synonym of Calogoniodiscus perelegans (superseded combination)
- Discus rupivagus: synonym of Canaridiscus rupivagus
- Discus serratus: synonym of Priodiscus serratus (superseded combination)
- Discus victorianus: synonym of Radiocentrum victoriana (superseded combination)
- Discus vorticella: synonym of Ctenophila vorticella (superseded combination)
