= Pherbellia tenuipes =

Scientific classification
- Kingdom: Animalia
- Phylum: Arthropoda
- Class: Insecta
- Order: Diptera
- Family: Sciomyzidae
- Genus: Pherbellia
- Species: P. tenuipes

Binomial name
- Pherbellia tenuipes (Loew, 1872)

Synonyms
- Sciomyza tenuipes Loew, 1872

Species of fly

Pherbellia tenuipes is a species of marsh fly (insects in the family Sciomyzidae).
