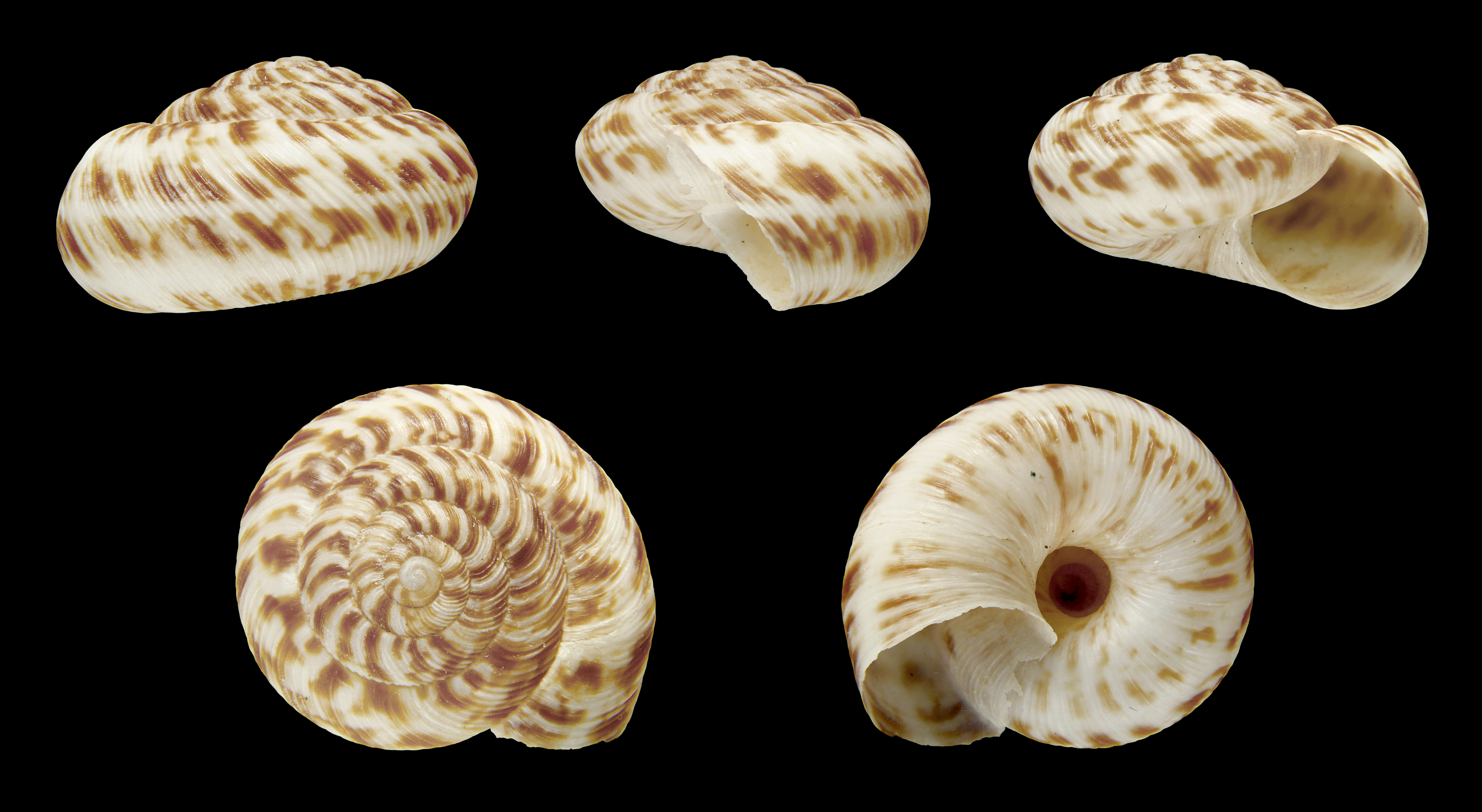
- Shell of Anguispira alternata

Scientific classification
- Kingdom: Animalia
- Phylum: Mollusca
- Class: Gastropoda
- Order: Stylommatophora
- Suborder: Helicina
- Superfamily: Punctoidea
- Family: Discidae
- Genus: Anguispira; Morse, 1864

Synonyms
- Anguispira (Anguispira) Morse, 1864 · alternate representation; Anguispira (Zonodiscus) Pilsbry, 1948 · alternate representation; Helix (Anguispira) Morse, 1864 · unaccepted; Patula (Anguispira) Morse, 1864

= Anguispira =

Genus of gastropods

Anguispira, the tigersnails, is a genus of small pulmonate land snails in the family Discidae endemic to North America. Snails in this genus are defined by their striped shells. Anguispira species are either habitat generalists like A. alternata or limestone specialists like A. cumberlandiana.

== Species ==
Species:

- Anguispira alabama (G.H.Clapp, 1920) — Alabama tigersnail
- Anguispira alternata (Say, 1817) — Flamed tigersnail
- Anguispira cumberlandiana (I.Lea, 1840) — Cumberland tigersnail
- Anguispira fergusoni (Bland, 1862) — Coastal plain tigersnail
- Anguispira holroydensis (Russell, 1956)
- Anguispira jessica (Kutchka, 1938) — Mountain tigersnail
- Anguispira knoxensis (Pilsbry, 1901) — Rustic tigersnail
- Anguispira kochi (L.Pfeiffer, 1846) — Banded tigersnail
- Anguispira macneilli (B.Walker, 1928) — Tombigbee tigersnail
- Anguispira mordax (Shuttleworth, 1852) — Appalachian tigersnail
- Anguispira nimapuna (H.B.Baker, 1932) — Nimapuna or Nimapu tigersnail
- Anguispira picta (G.H.Clapp, 1920) — Painted snake-coiled forest snail
- Anguispira rugoderma (Hubricht, 1938) — Pine Mountain tigersnail
- Anguispira russelli (Tozer, 1956)
- Anguispira stihleri (Dourson, 2015) — Greenbrier tigersnail
- Anguispira strongylodes (Pfeiffer, 1854) — Southeastern tigersnail

Synonyms

- Anguispira clarki Vanatta, 1924: synonym of Anguispira fergusoni (Bland, 1862)
- † Anguispira simplex Russell, 1955: synonym of † Haplotrema simplex (Russell, 1955) (new combination)
- Anguispira strigosa (A. Gould, 1846): synonym of Oreohelix strigosa (A. Gould, 1846) (unaccepted combination)
