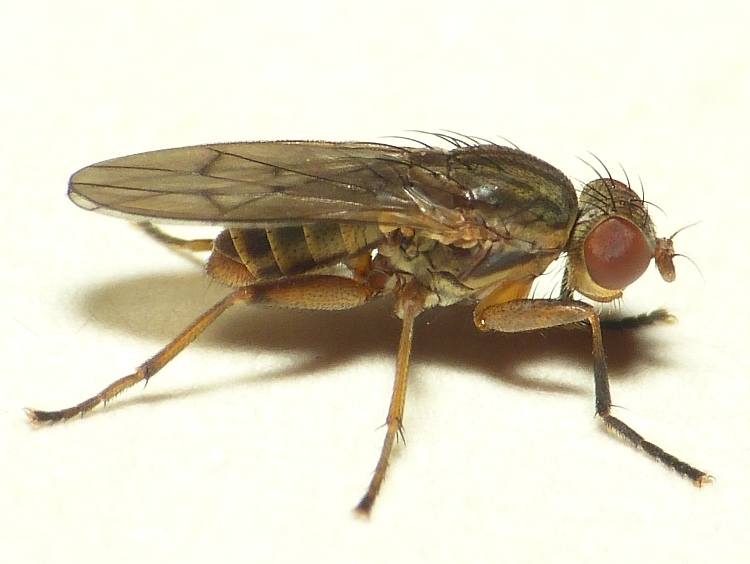
- Pherbellia argyra Netherlands

Scientific classification
- Kingdom: Animalia
- Phylum: Arthropoda
- Class: Insecta
- Order: Diptera
- Family: Sciomyzidae
- Genus: Pherbellia
- Species: P. argyra

Binomial name
- Pherbellia argyra Verbeke, 1967

= Pherbellia argyra =

Species of fly

Pherbellia argyra is a species of fly in the family Sciomyzidae. It is found in the Palearctic.
