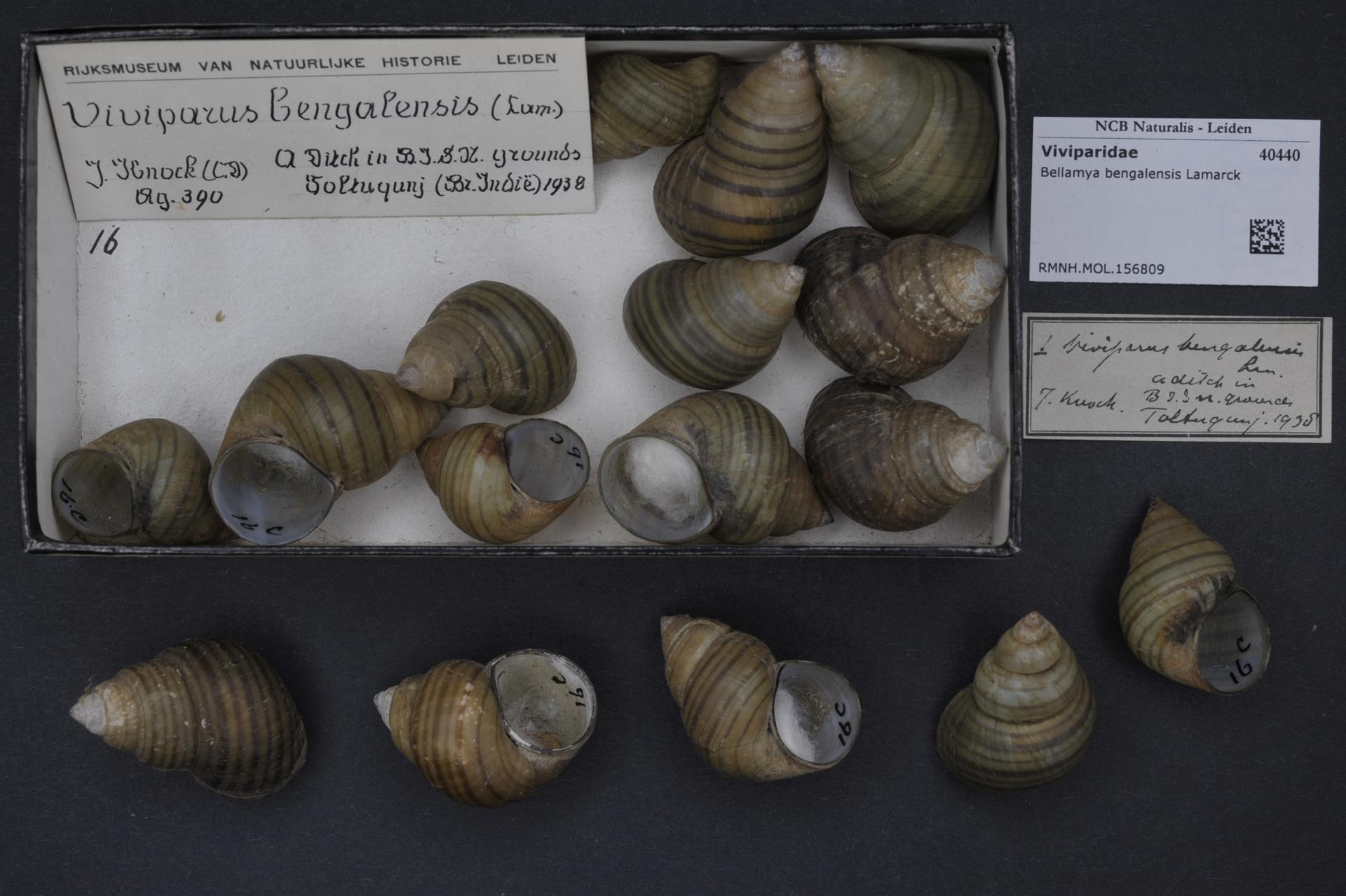
- Filopaludina bengalensis shells

Conservation status
- Least Concern (IUCN 3.1)

Scientific classification
- Kingdom: Animalia
- Phylum: Mollusca
- Class: Gastropoda
- Subclass: Caenogastropoda
- Order: Architaenioglossa
- Family: Viviparidae
- Genus: Filopaludina
- Species: F. bengalensis

Binomial name
- Filopaludina bengalensis (Lamarck, 1822)

Synonyms
- Bellamya bengalensis (Lamarck, 1822); Bellamya bengalensis f. annandalei (Kobelt, 1909); Bellamya bengalensis f. mandiensis (Kobelt, 1909); Paludina bengalensis Lamarck, 1822 (original combination); Vivipara bengalensis (Lamarck, 1822)

= Filopaludina bengalensis =

Species of gastropod

Filopaludina bengalensis, also known as Bellamya bengalensis, is a species of large freshwater snail with a gill and an operculum, an aquatic gastropod mollusc in the family Viviparidae.

== Distribution ==
This species is found in Iran, Nepal, Pakistan, India, Myanmar, Bangladesh.

== Ecology ==
Parasites of Filopaludina bengalensis include trematode Lissemysia ocellata and Lissemysia ovata.

== Human use ==
It is used as a food source for humans.
