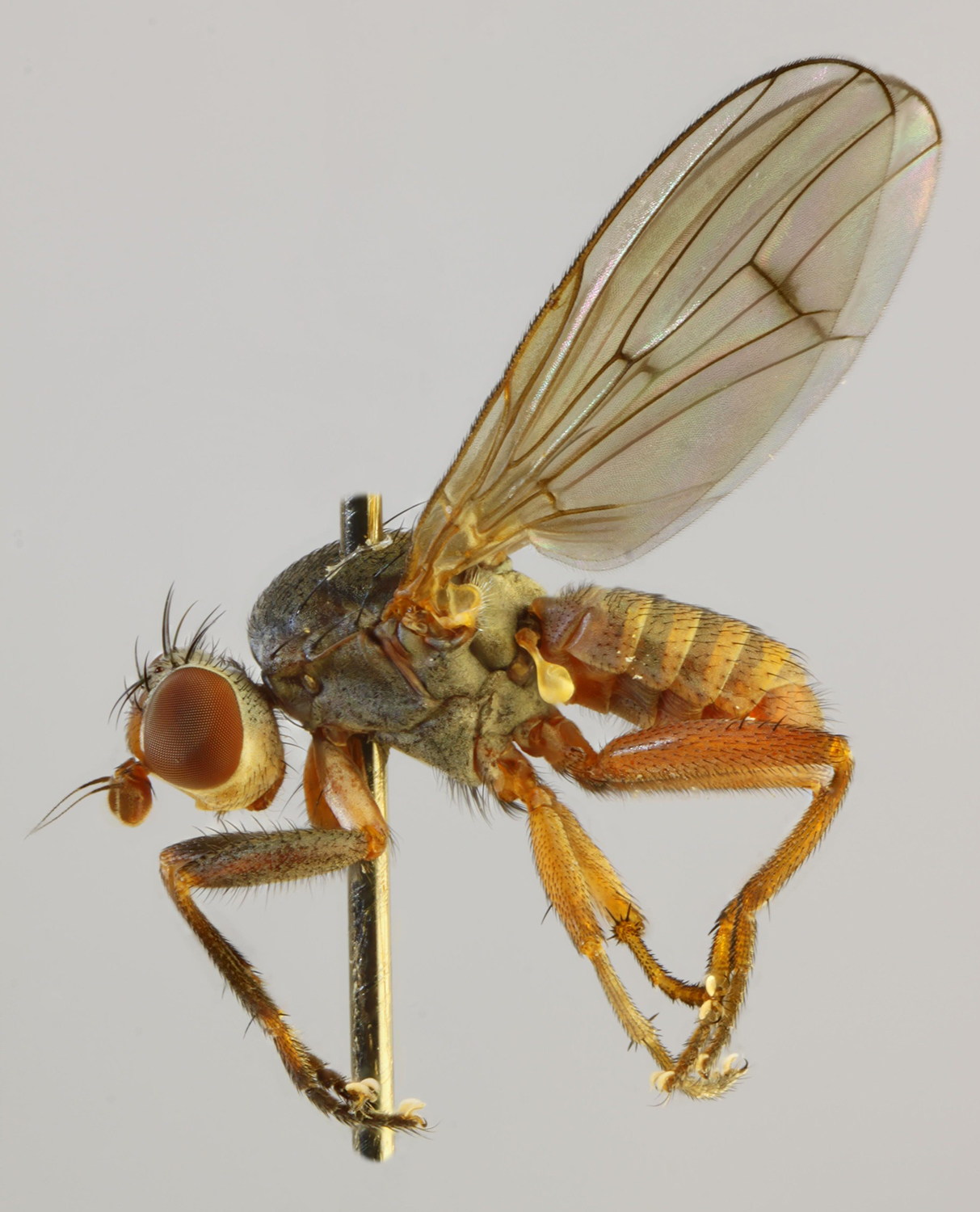
- Pherbellia ventralis North Wales

Scientific classification
- Kingdom: Animalia
- Phylum: Arthropoda
- Clade: Pancrustacea
- Class: Insecta
- Order: Diptera
- Family: Sciomyzidae
- Genus: Pherbellia
- Species: P. ventralis

Binomial name
- Pherbellia ventralis (Fallén, 1820)

= Pherbellia ventralis =

Species of fly

Pherbellia ventralis is a species of fly in the family Sciomyzidae. It is found in the Palearctic. Pherbellia ventralis is a small sciomyzid (body lengths up to 4.5 mm.). The body is dark grey blue to blue grey contrasting with the yellowish brown abdomen. The mid-frontal stripe is short. The larvae feed on aquatic snails including Stagnicola palustris.
