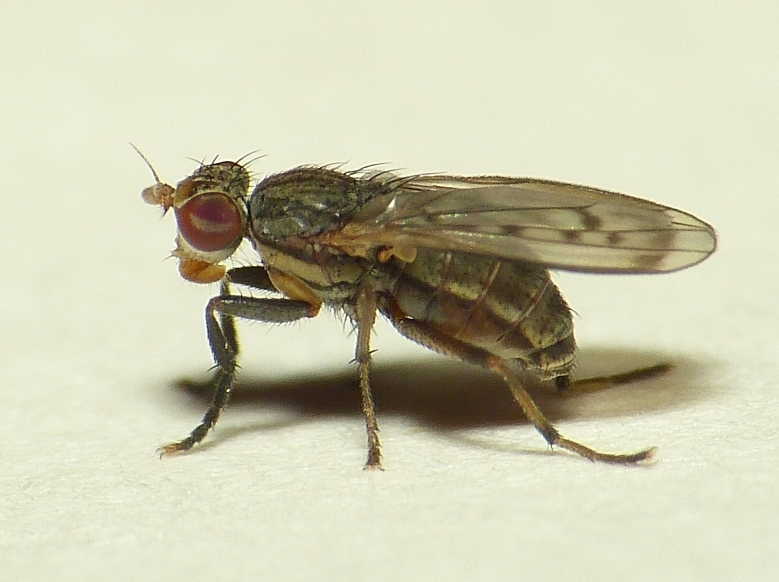
- Pherbellia nana Netherlands

Scientific classification
- Kingdom: Animalia
- Phylum: Arthropoda
- Class: Insecta
- Order: Diptera
- Family: Sciomyzidae
- Genus: Pherbellia
- Species: P. nana

Binomial name
- Pherbellia nana (Fallen, 1820)

= Pherbellia nana =

Species of fly

Pherbellia nana is a species of fly in the family Sciomyzidae. It is found in the Palearctic

At 3 mm. long P. nana is a very small sciomyzid.The eyes have one transverse band.The ocellar plate is short, grey and not pointed.There are two fine prescutellar acrostichal bristles. Legs 1 are black ("sauf les hanches").
