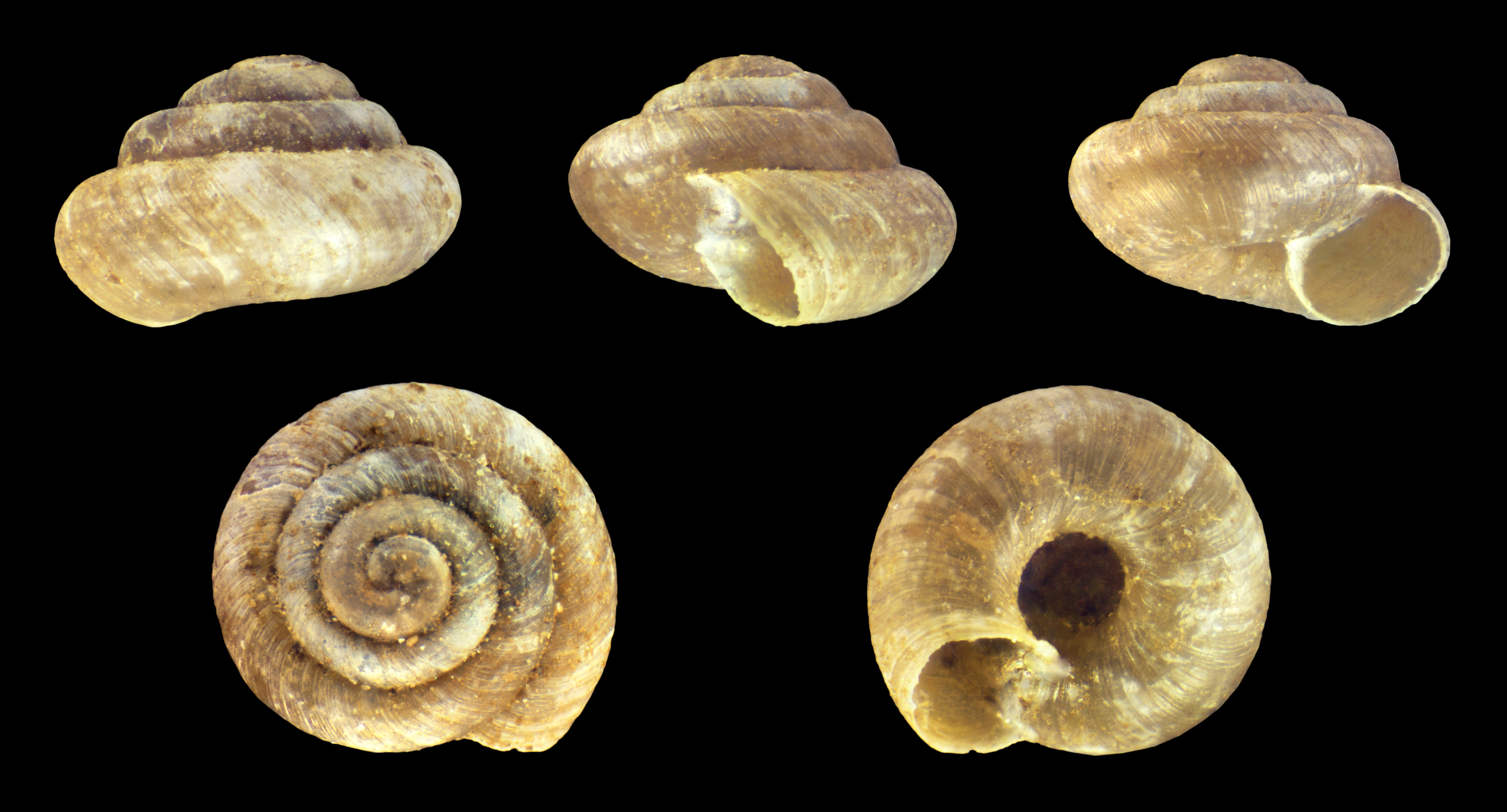
- Five views of a shell of Pyramidula rupestris

Scientific classification
- Kingdom: Animalia
- Phylum: Mollusca
- Class: Gastropoda
- Order: Stylommatophora
- Family: Pyramidulidae
- Genus: Pyramidula
- Species: P. rupestris

Binomial name
- Pyramidula rupestris (Draparnaud, 1801)

Synonyms
- Delomphalus rupestris (Draparnaud, 1801) · unaccepted (unaccepted combination); Helix (Patula) rupestris Draparnaud, 1801 · unaccepted (unaccepted combination); Helix hierosolymitana Bourguignat, 1852 · unaccepted (junior synonym); Helix rupestris Draparnaud, 1801 · unaccepted (original combination); Helix rupestris var. trochoides Moquin-Tandon, 1855 · unaccepted (junior synonym); Helix saxatilis Hartmann, 1821 · unaccepted (junior synonym); Patula (Pyramidula) rupestris (Draparnaud, 1801) · unaccepted (unaccepted combination); Pyramidula (Pyramidula) rupestris Draparnaud, 1801

= Pyramidula rupestris =

Species of gastropod

Pyramidula rupestris is a species of very small, air-breathing land snails, terrestrial pulmonate gastropod mollusks or micromollusks in the family Pyramidulidae.

The variety Pyramidula rupestris var. nylanderi Morse, 1920is a synonym of Planogyra asteriscus (Morse, 1857)

== Shell description ==
The width of the shell is up to 2.7 mm, the height is up to 2.5 mm.

== Distribution ==
This species occurs in:

- The entire Mediterranean region
- Dalmatia
- Spain
- The Alps
- Northern Italy
- Greece
- Israel
- Asia
- Morocco
