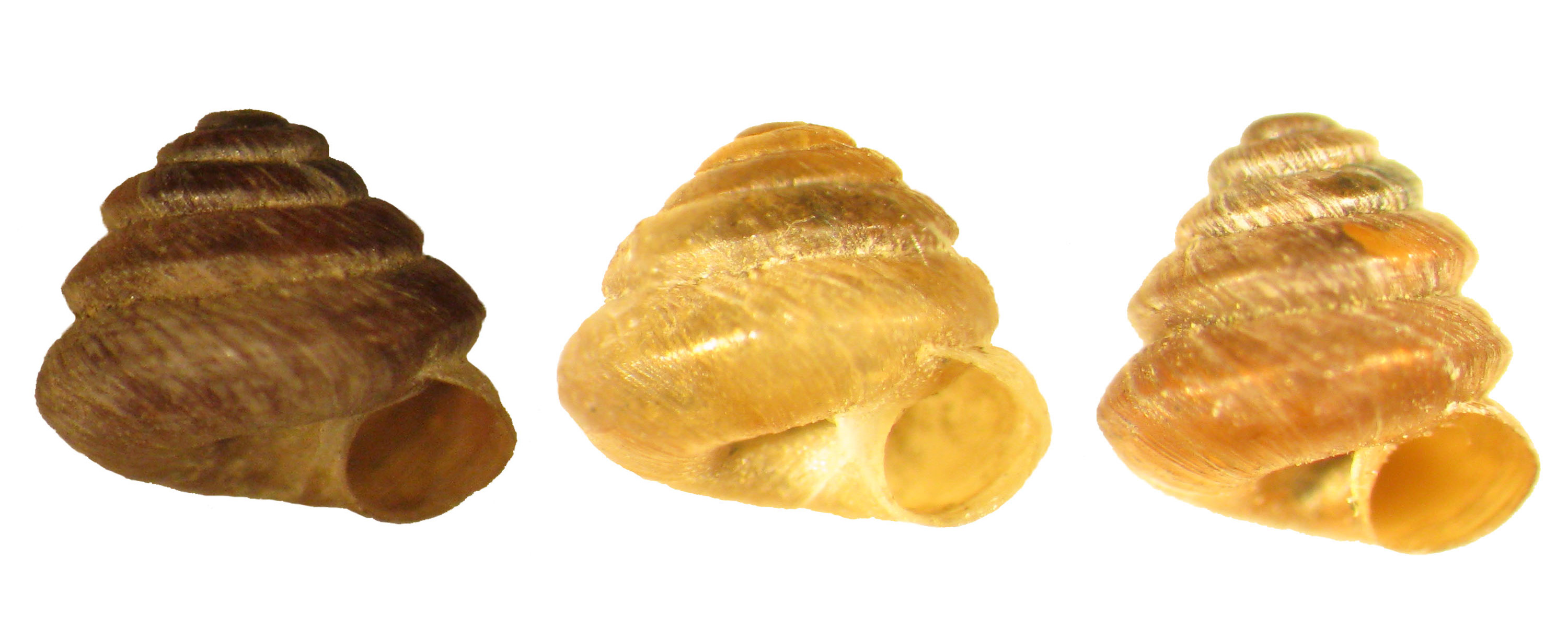
- Two paratypes and holotype of P. kuznetsovi in collection of Zoological Museum of Moscow University

Scientific classification
- Kingdom: Animalia
- Phylum: Mollusca
- Class: Gastropoda
- Order: Stylommatophora
- Family: Pyramidulidae
- Genus: Pyramidula
- Species: P. kuznetsovi

Binomial name
- Pyramidula kuznetsovi Schileyko & Balashov, 2012

= Pyramidula kuznetsovi =

Species of gastropod

Pyramidula kuznetsovi is a species of small air-breathing land snail, a terrestrial pulmonate gastropod mollusc in the family Pyramidulidae.

== Shell description ==
The diameter of the shell is up to 2.6 mm, the height is up to 2.3 mm at 5.5 whorls. The presence of a distinct peripheral angle distinguishes this species from all other known species in this genus.

== Distribution ==
This species is known only from four closely grouped locations in the valley of the Kali Gandaki River between Dhaulagiri and Annapurna mountains, Mustang District of Nepal.
