= Pherbellia albovaria =

Scientific classification
- Kingdom: Animalia
- Phylum: Arthropoda
- Class: Insecta
- Order: Diptera
- Family: Sciomyzidae
- Genus: Pherbellia
- Species: P. albovaria

Binomial name
- Pherbellia albovaria (Coquillett, 1901)

Synonyms
- Sciomyza albovaria Coquillett, 1901

Species of fly

Pherbellia albovaria is a species of marsh fly (insects in the family Sciomyzidae).
