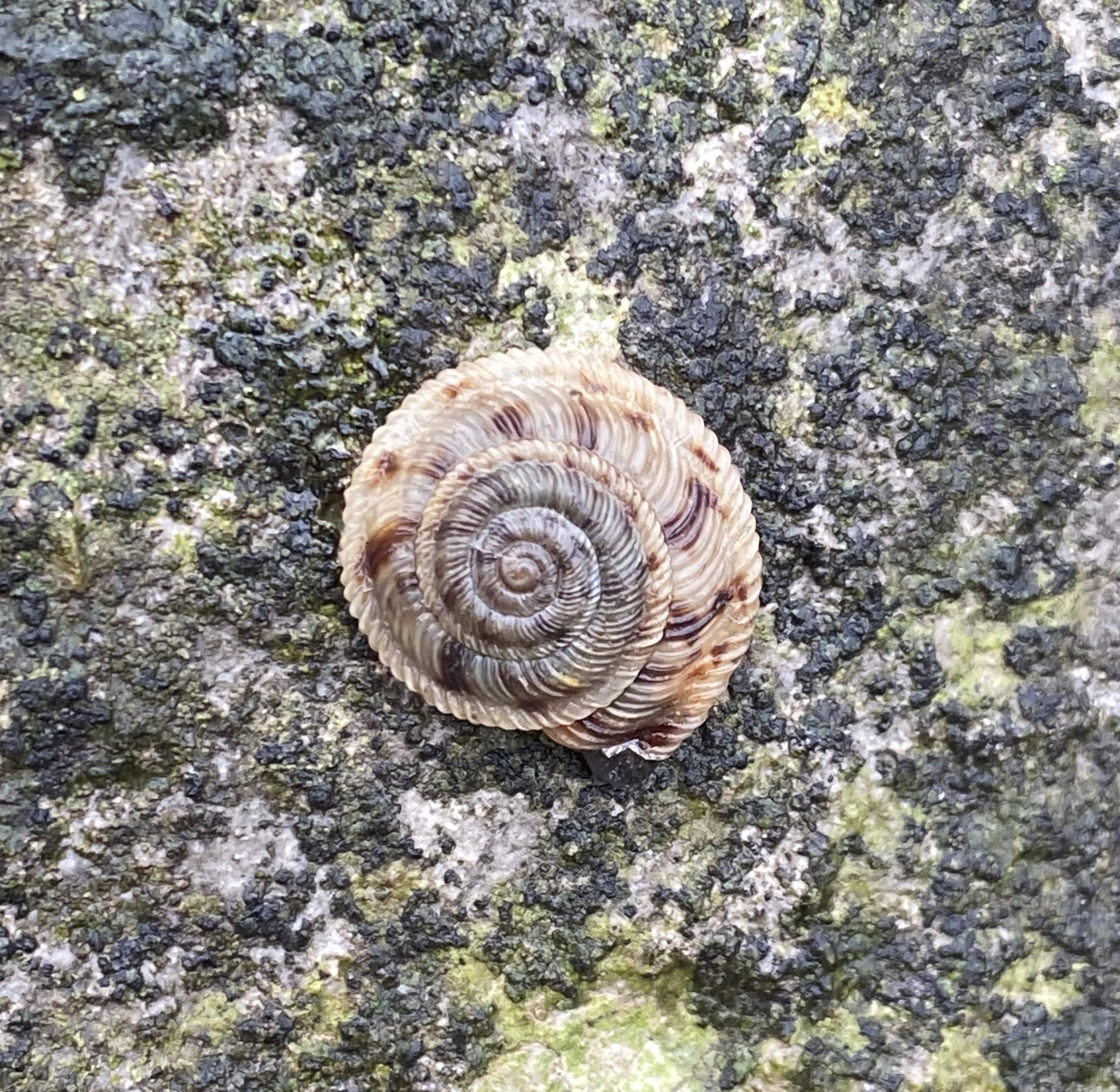
- A mature Cumberland tigersnail found in Tennessee

Conservation status
- Vulnerable (NatureServe)

Scientific classification
- Kingdom: Animalia
- Phylum: Mollusca
- Class: Gastropoda
- Order: Stylommatophora
- Family: Discidae
- Genus: Anguispira
- Species: A. cumberlandiana

Binomial name
- Anguispira cumberlandiana (I. Lea, 1840)

Synonyms
- Carocolla cumberlandiana (Lea, 1840)

= Anguispira cumberlandiana =

Vulnerable species of land snail

Anguispira cumberlandiana, also known as the Cumberland tigersnail or the Cumberland disc, is a range-restricted species of pulmonate land snail in the family Discidae, the disk snails. The species is named after the Cumberland Plateau, a section of the Appalachian Plateau that overlaps with its range.

== Physical appearance ==
The Cumberland tigersnail possesses a thin lens-shaped shell, roughly 13-18 mm (0.51-0.71 in) in diameter and 5-6 mm (0.2-0.24 in) in height. The umbilicus is broad and deep. The shell is deeply striated with a sharply protruding, serrated carina. The embryonic whorls are smooth. The base of the shell is typically pale olive or tan in color, with irregular, radiating chestnut to dark brown stripes and oblique radial streaks. The body is very light or dark gray with a reddish foot. The species is visually similar to Anguispira alabama.

== Ecology ==
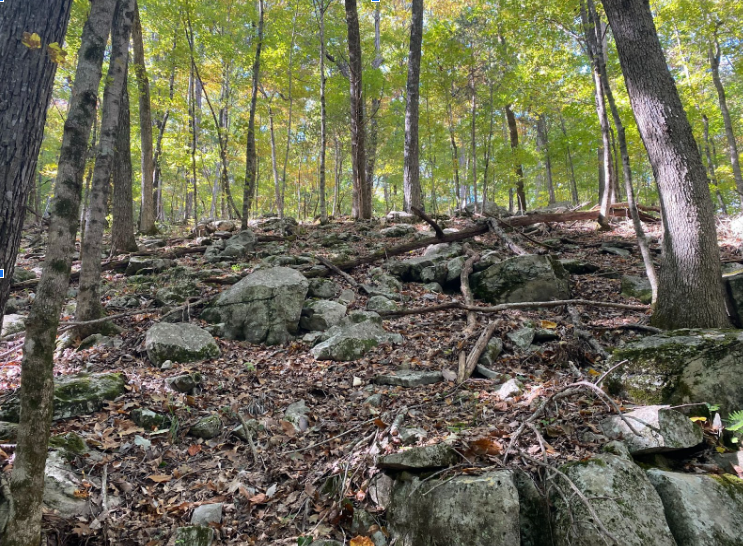
A limestone outcrop where A. cumberlandiana was found

The Cumberland tigersnail is found in a few counties in southeastern Tennessee and northeastern Alabama along the southern edge of the Cumberland Plateau. Though some previous reports claim that Cumberland tigernsail individuals were found in Pennsylvania, but they are now believed to be incorrect. The species is listed as vulnerable in Tennessee and critically imperiled in Alabama. It is possible that the Cumberland tigersnail occupies an area larger than its currently discovered range. However its specific habitat requirements and tendency to exist in elusive, distinct populations – sometimes hundreds of kilometers of apart – make estimating population size and distribution difficult.

Like many other members of the genus Anguispira, the Cumberland tigersnail is a limestone specialist (calciphile). They are most commonly found on or around hillside limestone outcrops near rivers or streams in hardwood forests. Its thin shell allows it to burrow into crevices in limestone boulders where it retreats in order to shelter from the elements and hibernate. Due to their reliance on limestone for suitable habitat, limestone mining on the Cumberland Plateau likely has negative impacts on the species' survival.
