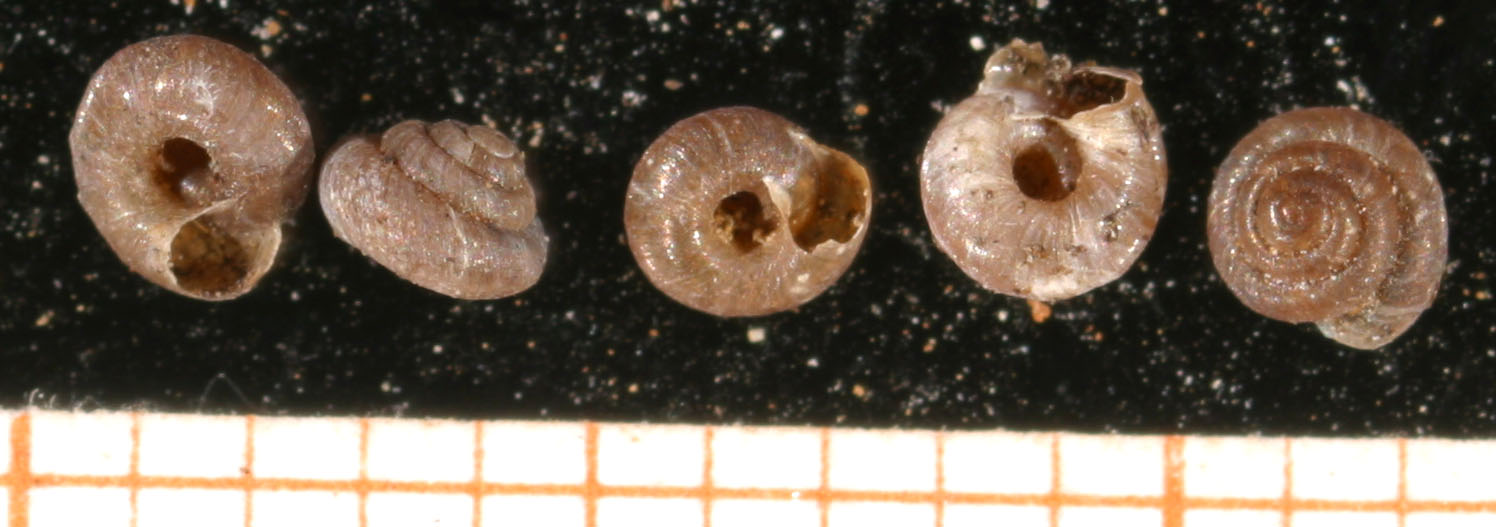
- Five shells of Pyramidula rupestris

Scientific classification
- Kingdom: Animalia
- Phylum: Mollusca
- Class: Gastropoda
- Order: Stylommatophora
- Suborder: Helicina
- Infraorder: Pupilloidei
- Superfamily: Pupilloidea
- Family: Pyramidulidae; Kennard & B. B. Woodward, 1914

= Pyramidulidae =

Family of gastropods

Pyramidulidae is a family of small air-breathing land snails, terrestrial pulmonate gastropod mollusks in the superfamily Pupilloidea.

== Anatomy ==
In this family, the number of haploid chromosomes lies between 26 and 30 (according to the values in this table).

== Genera ==
Genera within the family Pyramidulidae include:

- Pyramidula Fitzinger, 1833 - the type genus

Synonyms

- Cratere Porro, 1838: synonym of Pyramidula Fitzinger, 1833
- Pyramidulops Habe, 1956: synonym of Pyramidula Fitzinger, 1833
