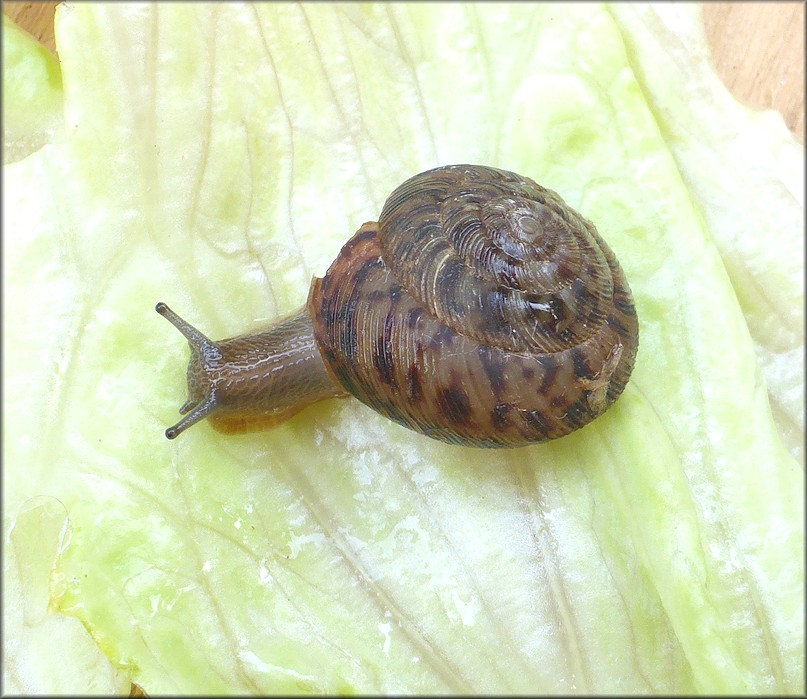
- A mature flamed tigersnail found in Tennessee

Conservation status
- Secure (NatureServe)

Scientific classification
- Kingdom: Animalia
- Phylum: Mollusca
- Class: Gastropoda
- Order: Stylommatophora
- Family: Discidae
- Genus: Anguispira
- Species: A. alternata

Binomial name
- Anguispira alternata (Say, 1816)

Synonyms
- List: Anguispira (Anguispira) alternatus (Say, 1817); Anguispira (Patula) alternata (Say, 1817); Discus (Anguispira) alternata (Say, 1817); Helix alternata Say, 1817; Patula alternata (Say, 1817); Pyramidula alternata (Say, 1817); Anguispira (Anguispira) alternatus lawae Pilsbry, 1948; Anguispira alternata crassa B. Walker, 1928; Anguispira alternata var. crassa B. Walker, 1928; Anguispira alternata eriensis (G. H. Clapp, 1916); Pyramidula alternata var. eriensis G. H. Clapp, 1916; Anguispira alternata f. angulata Pilsbry, 1948; Anguispira alternata var. palustris B. Walker, 1928; Helix alternata var. costata J. Lewis, 1871; Pyramidula alternata costata (J. Lewis, 1871); Pyramidula alternata var. costata (J. Lewis, 1871); Anguispira alternata var. alba Tryon, 1866; Pyramidula alternata var. alba (Tryon, 1866); Helix inflecta L. Pfeiffer, 1858; Helix alternata var. carinata A. Férussac, 1832; Corocolla dubia Sheppard, 1829; Helix scabra Lamarck, 1822

= Anguispira alternata =

Species of land snail

Anguispira alternata, also known as the flamed disc or flamed tigersnail, is a species of pulmonate land snail in the family Discidae, the disk snails. It is the most common and widespread member of the Anguispira genus, and one of the more common land snail species in North America.

== Appearance and anatomy ==
Flamed tigersnails are medium-sized snails with shells ranging from 17 to 25 millimeters (0.67 to 0.98 inches) in diameter. On average, adults have a diameter of 20 mm (0.79 in) and a height of 12 mm (0.47 in). The shell is a depressed heliciform with a rounded, thin-lipped aperture and 5-6 whorls. The base of the shell is pale yellow to brown, and defined by irregular reddish or brown splotches. There are faint radial streaks extending to the base of the shell and a belt of spots below the periphery. It is covered in rib-like striae and the surface is very lightly wrinkled. The embryotic whorl is light gray and smooth. The snail's appearance can vary across its range. Malacologist Henry A. Pilsbry claimed that snails in mountainous or rocky regions tend to have more angular and heavily ribbed shells while snails in lowland areas are more rounded and smooth.

Flamed tigersnails have two pairs of tentacles with eyes on the tips of the upper tentacles (or eyestalks). The body can range from a grayish brown to brownish black with a pale foot. The mucus the snail secretes is typically orange or reddish in color. When the snail retracts inside of its shell, the anterior side of the body is pulled outside-in. The species' average resting heart beat ranges from 37 to 60 beats per minute, but can reach 90+ beats per minute when active.

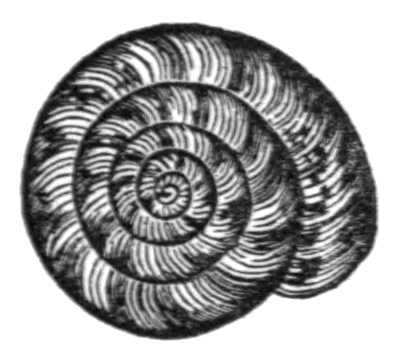
Apical view of the shell

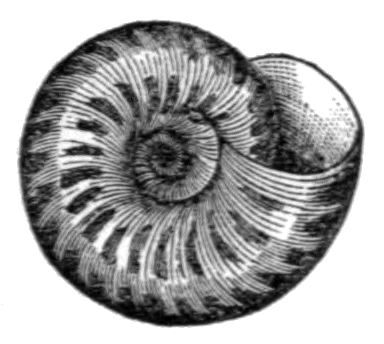
Umbilical view of the shell

== Reproduction ==
The flamed tigersnail is hermaphroditic but not viviparous. The eggs the species lays tend to range from 2 to 3 mm (0.08 to 0.12 in) in diameter, are ovate, white in color, and have a gelatinous coating that likely acts as protection. Eggs can be laid alone or in clusters, and typically take 30 to 45 days to hatch. Hatching time can vary based on moisture, temperature and other factors. The flamed tigersnail does not have a love dart.

== Ecology ==
The flamed tigersnail is found in urban and rural environments across the United States and Canada. The most northern and eastern portion of its range is in New Brunswick, Canada, and it extends to Florida in the south to Kansas in the west. Though populations are considered secure across most of its range, the flamed tigersnail is listed as critically imperiled in Louisiana and Alabama, imperiled in North Carolina, and vulnerable in Indiana and Pennsylvania. It is considered extirpated from Mississippi.

The flamed tigersnail is fairly adaptable and found in a wide range of habitats. They are most commonly found in forests or glades near streams, climbing on trees, limestone outcrops, or buried in leaf litter. However, they can also be found along roadsides, in vacant lots, and other urban settings. One study estimated that flamed tigersnails have an average home range of 40 sq meters (430.56 sq ft). Flamed tigersnails tend to live in groups, commonly burrowing and hibernating together during winter months. In Kansas, snails were observed living in groups of ranging from 16 to 75 snails per foot. Scientists have documented the species climbing on trees at night, presumably to eat bark-dwelling algae. It is unknown if they favor any specific species of tree, but one population was documented most frequently climbing on American beech trees. Generally, flamed tigersnails are herbivores that feed on decaying plant material, fungi, and algae.

== Parasites and disease ==
The flamed tigersnail serves as an intermediate host for the nematode Parelaphostrongylus tenuis, a parasite known to cause cerebrospinal nematodiasis in white-tailed deer, caribou, moose, elk, and mule deer. The snails ingest the nematode larvae in deer feces, and then the snail can spread the nematode to a new animal if they are ingested.

Another parasite of the flamed tigersnail is Postharmostomum helicis.
