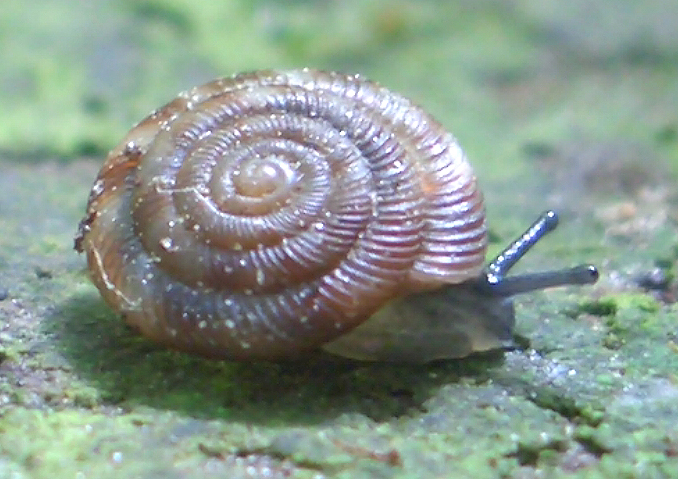
- A live individual of Discus rotundatus

Scientific classification
- Kingdom: Animalia
- Phylum: Mollusca
- Class: Gastropoda
- Order: Stylommatophora
- Superfamily: Punctoidea
- Family: Discidae; Thiele, 1931 (1866)

Synonyms
- Patulinae Tryon, 1866 Gonyodiscinae A. J. Wagner, 1928 Anguispiridae MacMillan, 1955 (n.a.)

= Discidae =

Family of gastropods

Discidae is a taxonomic family of small air-breathing land snails, terrestrial gastropod mollusks in the superfamily Punctoidea.

== Genera ==
The family Discidae has no subfamilies. Genera within the family Discidae include:

- Anguispira Morse, 1864
- † Calogoniodiscus Pfeffer, 1930
- Canaridiscus Alonso & Ibáñez, 2011
- † Coxiola Pfeffer, 1930
- Discus Fitzinger, 1833
- † Manganellia Harzhauser, Neubauer & Georgopoulou in Harzhauser et al., 2014
- † Protodiscus Solem & Yochelson, 1979

Synonyms

- Zonodiscus Pilsbry, 1948 - or as a subgenus of Anguispira: synonym of Anguispira (Zonodiscus) Pilsbry, 1948, represented as Anguispira Morse, 1864
