= List of endangered species in Virginia =

Below is a list of the endangered and threatened animal and plant species in the Commonwealth of Virginia, United States.

== Animals ==
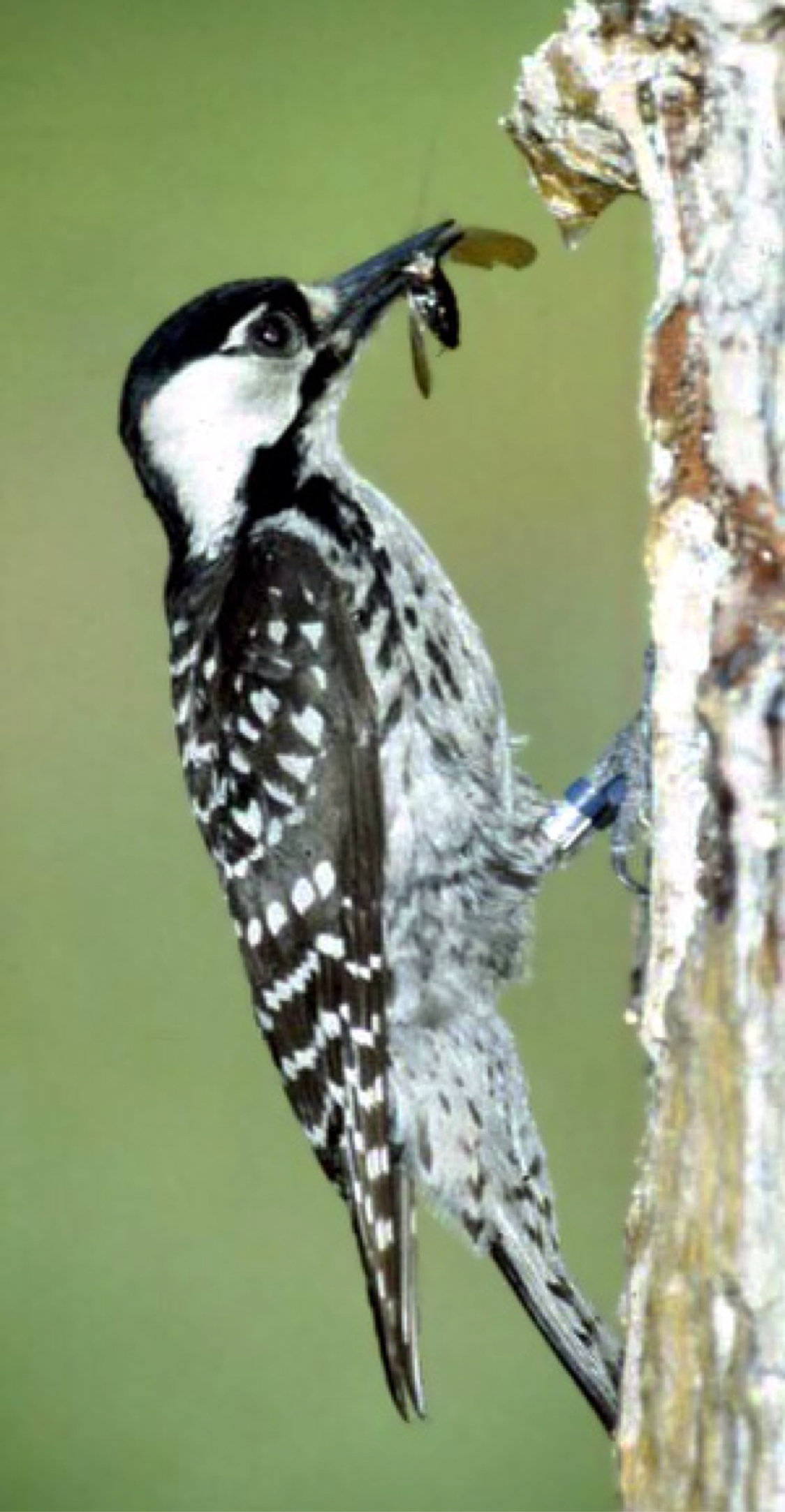
Red-cockaded woodpecker

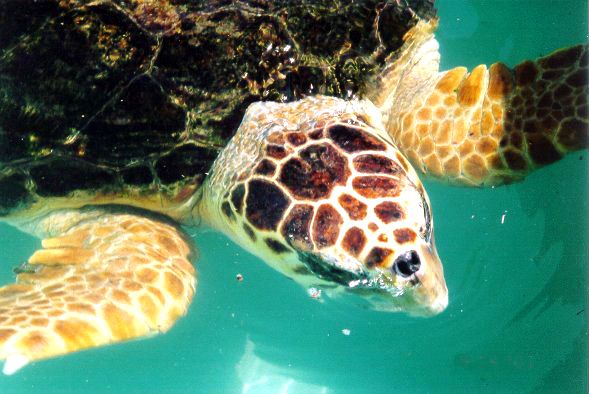
Loggerhead sea turtle

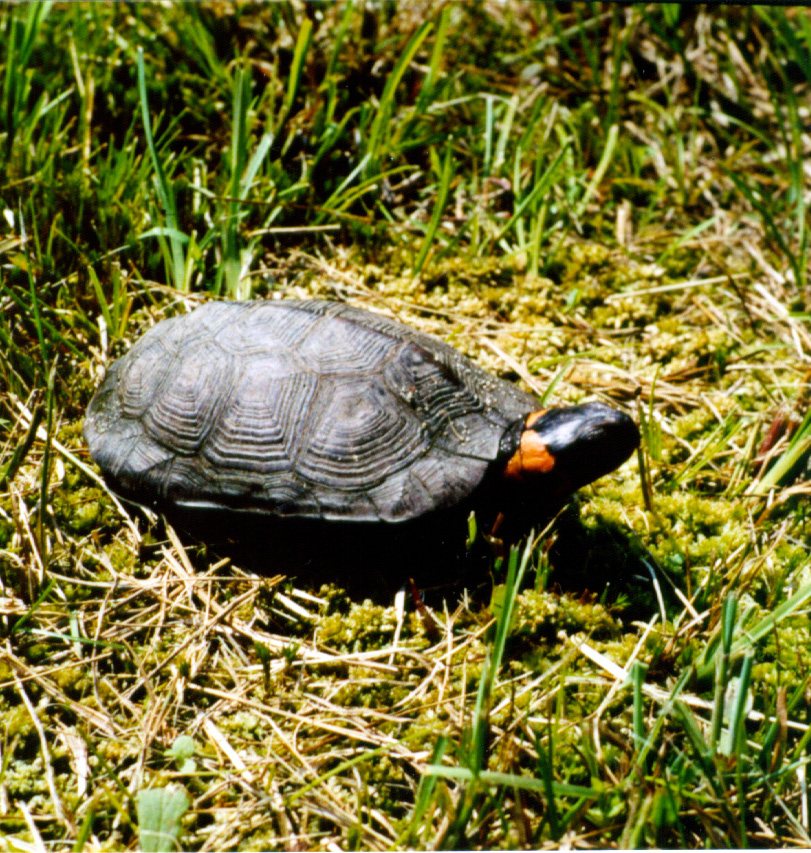
Bog turtle

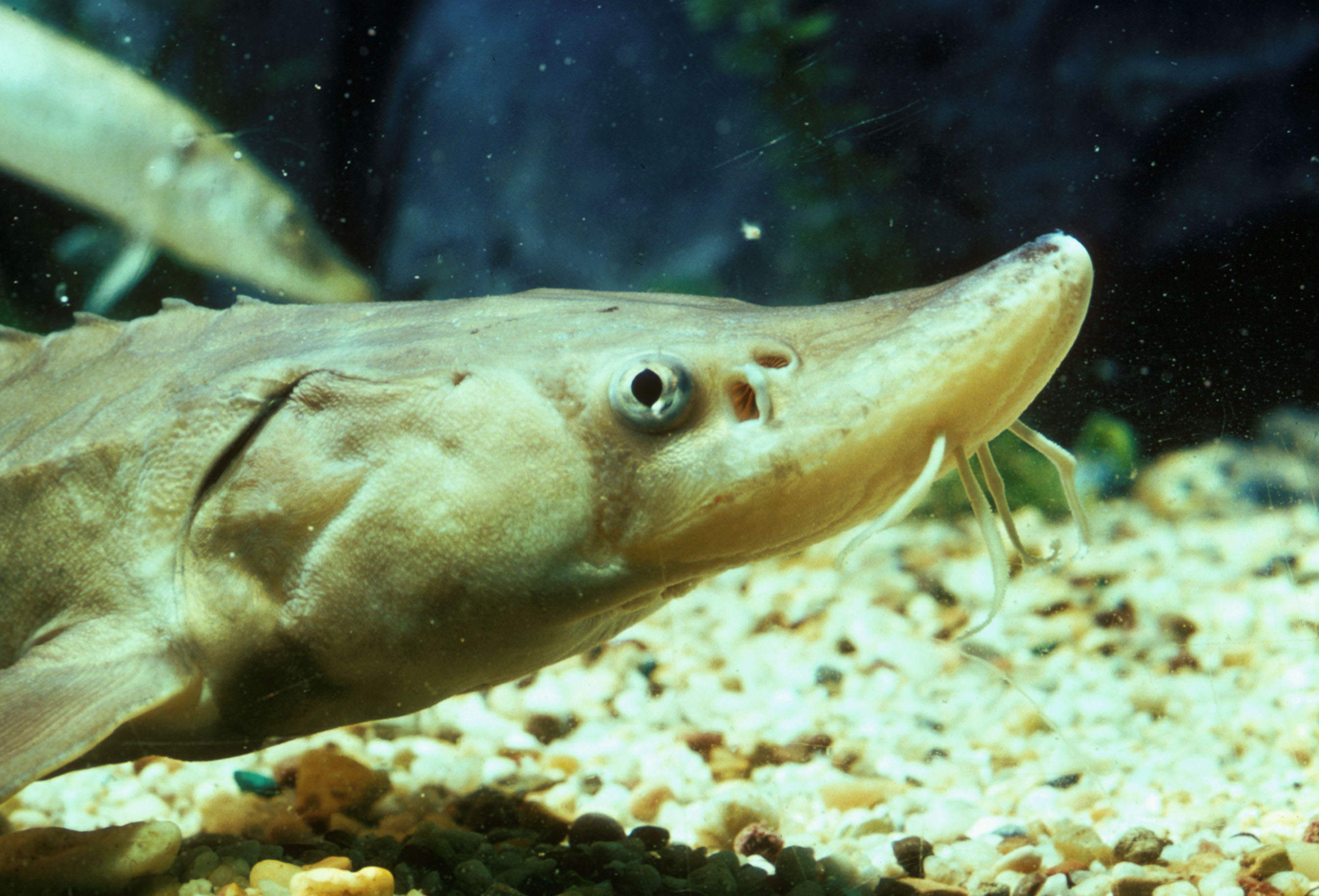
Shortnose sturgeon

=== Mammals ===
- Gray bat (Myotis grisescens)
- Indiana bat (Myotis sodalis)
- Virginia big-eared bat (Corynorhinus townsendii virginianus)
- West Indian manatee (Trichechus manatus)
- Dismal Swamp southeastern shrew (Sorex longirostris fisheri)
- Fin whale (Balaenoptera physalus)
- Humpback whale (Megaptera novaeangliae)

=== Birds ===
- Piping plover (Charadrius melodus)
- Roseate tern (Sterna dougallii dougallii)
- Red-cockaded woodpecker (Picoides borealis)
- Kirtland’s warbler (Dendroica kirtlandii)

=== Reptiles ===
- Green sea turtle (Chelonia mydas)
- Hawksbill turtle (Eretmochelys imbricata)
- Kemp's ridley (Lepidochelys kempii)
- Leatherback sea turtle (Dermochelys coriacea)
- Loggerhead sea turtle (Caretta caretta)
- Bog turtle (Clemmys muhlenbergii)

=== Fish ===
- Slender chub (Erimystax cahni)
- Spotfin chub (Cyprinella monacha)
- Duskytail darter (Etheostoma percnurum)
- Roanoke logperch (Percina rex)
- Shortnose sturgeon (Acipenser brevirostrum)
- Blackside dace (Phoxinus cumberlandensis)
- Yellowfin madtom (Noturus flavipinnis)

=== Insects ===
- Northeastern beach tiger beetle (Cicindela dorsalis dorsalis)
- Mitchell’s satyr (Neonympha mitchellii)

=== Crustaceans ===
- Lee County cave isopod (Lirceus usdagalun)
- Madison cave isopod (Antrolana lira)

=== Gastropods ===
- Virginia fringed mountain snail (Polygyriscus virginianus)

=== Bivalves ===
- Purple bean (Villosa perpurpurea)
- Cumberlandian combshell (Epioblasma brevidens)
- Fanshell (Cyprogenia stegaria)
- Appalachian monkeyface (Quadrula sparsa)
- Cumberland monkeyface (Quadrula intermedia)
- Pink mucket (Lampsilis abrupta)
- Oyster mussel (Epioblasma capsaeformis)
- Birdwing pearlymussel (Lemiox rimosus)
- Cracking pearly mussel (Hemistena lata)
- Dromedary pearly mussel (Dromus dromas)
- Green blossom pearlymussel (Epioblasma torulosa gubernaculum)
- Littlewing pearlymussel (Pegias fabula)
- Fine-rayed pigtoe (Fusconaia cuneolus)
- Rough pigtoe (Pleurobema plenum)
- Shiny pigtoe (Fusconaia cor)
- Rough rabbitsfoot (Quadrula cylindrica strigillata)
- Tan riffleshell (Epioblasma florentina walkeri)
- James River spinymussel (Pleurobema collina)
- Dwarf wedgemussel (Alasmidonta heterodon)

== Plants ==
- Sensitive joint-vetch (Aeschynomene virginica)
- Shale barren rock-cress (Arabis serotina)
- Virginia round-leaf birch (Betula uber)
- Small-anthered bittercress (Cardamine micranthera)
- Smooth purple coneflower (Echinacea laevigata)
- Virginia sneezeweed (Helenium virginicum)
- Swamp pink (Helonias bullata)
- Peter's mountain mallow (Iliamna corei)
- Small whorled pogonia (Isotria medeoloides)
- Eastern prairie fringed orchid (Platanthera leucophaea)
- Michaux's sumac (Rhus michauxii)
- American chaffseed (Schwalbea americana)
- Northeastern bulrush (Scirpus ancistrochaetus)
- Virginia spiraea (Spiraea virginiana)
