= Monkeyface =

Monkeyface or monkey-face may refer to:

- Monkeyface prickleback (Cebidichthys violaceus), a North Pacific species of fish
- Appalachian monkeyface (Quadrula sparsa), a North American species of freshwater mussel
- Cumberland monkeyface (Quadrula intermedia), a North American species of freshwater mussel
- Rio Grande monkeyface (Quadrula couchiana), a North American species of freshwater mussel
