= Sculptured pigtoe =

Conservation status
- Near Threatened (IUCN 2.3)

- Vulnerable (NatureServe)

Scientific classification
- Kingdom: Animalia
- Phylum: Mollusca
- Class: Bivalvia
- Order: Unionida
- Family: Unionidae
- Genus: Rotundaria
- Species: R. infucata

Binomial name
- Rotundaria infucata (Conrad, 1834)

Synonyms
- Quadrula infucata (Conrad, 1834)

Species of bivalve

The sculptured pigtoe (Rotundaria infucata) is a species of freshwater mussel native to the United States. It is endemic to the Apalachicola and Ochlockonee River systems in the states of Alabama, Florida, and Georgia.

It was formerly classified under Quadrula, but in 2012 it was moved to Rotundaria based on genetic evidence. It was also formerly included in the now-obsolete genus Quincuncina, and in Fusconaia based on shell morphology.
