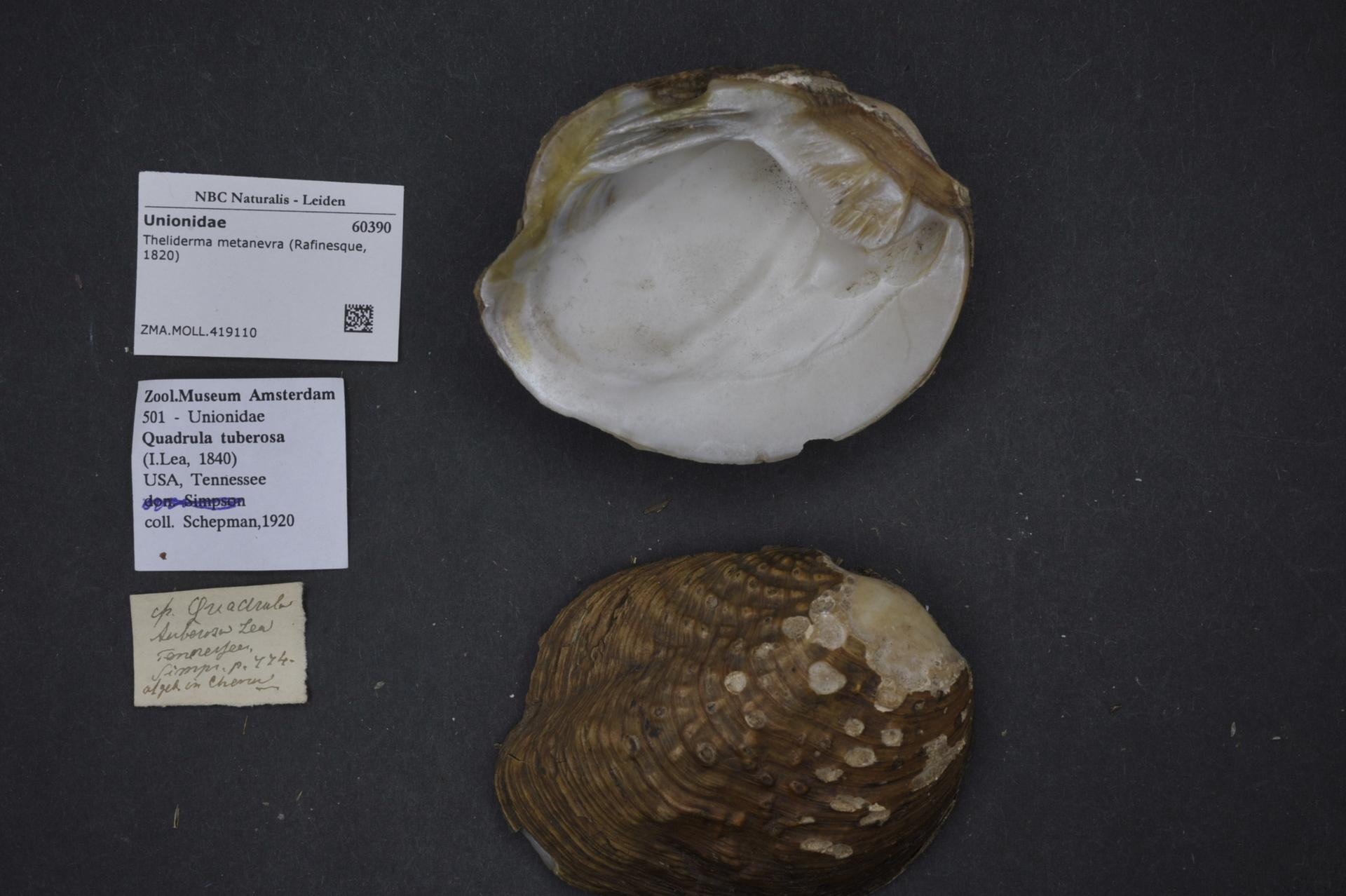

Conservation status
- Presumed Extinct (NatureServe)

Scientific classification
- Domain: Eukaryota
- Kingdom: Animalia
- Phylum: Mollusca
- Class: Bivalvia
- Order: Unionida
- Family: Unionidae
- Genus: Theliderma
- Species: T. tuberosa

Binomial name
- Theliderma tuberosa (I. Lea, 1840)

Synonyms
- Quadrula tuberosa (I. Lea, 1840)

= Theliderma tuberosa =

Species of bivalve

Theliderma tuberosa, the rough rockshell, is a species of freshwater mussel. It is an aquatic bivalve mollusk in the family Unionidae, the river mussels. It has sometimes been treated as a variety or big-river ecotype of Theliderma metanevra, due to only having slight shell differences.

This species was endemic to the Cumberland River watershed in the states of Kentucky and Tennessee. It is believed to be either extinct or critically endangered due to habitat destruction and pollution.

== Sources ==
- Bogan, A.E. 1996. Quadrula tuberosa. 2006 IUCN Red List of Threatened Species. Downloaded on 7 August 2007.
