= Rotundaria succissa =

Conservation status
- Least Concern (IUCN 3.1)

Scientific classification
- Kingdom: Animalia
- Phylum: Mollusca
- Class: Bivalvia
- Order: Unionida
- Family: Unionidae
- Genus: Rotundaria
- Species: R. succissa

Binomial name
- Rotundaria succissa (I. Lea, 1852)

Synonyms
- Quadrula succissa (I. Lea, 1852)

Species of bivalve

Rotundaria succissa is a species of bivalve in the family Unionidae.

It is native to the United States, where it is endemic to the Apalachicolan Region of Alabama and Florida. Here, it is found in the Choctawhatchee, Escambia, and Yellow River systems. It is considered to be a somewhat "hardy" mussel in terms of tolerating poor water quality, and its populations appear to be stable.

It was formerly classified under Quadrula, but in 2012 it was moved to Rotundaria based on genetic evidence.
