= Rotundaria houstonensis =

Conservation status
- Imperiled (NatureServe)

Scientific classification
- Kingdom: Animalia
- Phylum: Mollusca
- Class: Bivalvia
- Order: Unionida
- Family: Unionidae
- Genus: Rotundaria
- Species: R. houstonensis

Binomial name
- Rotundaria houstonensis (I. Lea, 1859)

Synonyms
- Quadrula houstonensis (I. Lea, 1859)

Species of bivalve

Rotundaria houstonensis, the smooth pimpleback, is a species of freshwater mussel native to the United States. It is endemic to the Colorado and Brazos River drainages in Texas.

This species has experienced a decline due to pollution and habitat loss. In 2011 the United States Fish and Wildlife Service determined that although this species met the criteria for listing under the Endangered Species Act, its listing should be precluded for higher-priority species. Its current legal status is "Candidate".

It was formerly classified under Quadrula, but in 2012 it was moved to Rotundaria based on genetic evidence.
