= Alabama orb =

Conservation status
- Near Threatened (IUCN 2.3)

- Apparently Secure (NatureServe)

Scientific classification
- Kingdom: Animalia
- Phylum: Mollusca
- Class: Bivalvia
- Order: Unionida
- Family: Unionidae
- Genus: Rotundaria
- Species: R. asperata

Binomial name
- Rotundaria asperata (I. Lea, 1861)

Synonyms
- Quadrula asperata (I. Lea, 1861)

Species of bivalve

Rotundaria asperata, the Alabama orb, is a species of freshwater mussel, an aquatic bivalve mollusk.

It is native to the United States, where it is endemic to the Mobile River drainage where it is found in medium-size rivers and creeks.

This species was moved from Quadrula to Rotundaria based on genetic evidence in 2012.
