= Golden orb =

Golden orb may refer to:

- Rotundaria aurea, a species of freshwater mussel
- Golden orb spiders
- Maya the Bee: The Golden Orb
- Golden Orb, a winning horse of 1911 R J Peters Stakes race (Australia)
- Golden Orb, a winning horse of 1920 Wokingham Stakes race (Great Britain), trained by Jack Jarvis
- The Golden Orb, a 2001 novel by Douglas Niles as part of the Icewall trilogy of the Dragonlance novel series
- A gold-coloured spherical object, used in popular culture, like "Part 3" (Twin Peaks) and Dragon Quest V
- Operation Golden Orb, code name for the Coronation of Charles III and Camilla in 2023
