= Rotundaria refulgens =

Conservation status
- Near Threatened (IUCN 2.3)

Scientific classification
- Kingdom: Animalia
- Phylum: Mollusca
- Class: Bivalvia
- Order: Unionida
- Family: Unionidae
- Genus: Rotundaria
- Species: R. refulgens

Binomial name
- Rotundaria refulgens (I. Lea, 1868)

Synonyms
- Quadrula refulgens (I. Lea, 1868)

Species of freshwater mussel

Rotundaria refulgens, the purple pimpleback, is a species of freshwater mussel.

This species is native to the United States, where it is endemic to the coastal Gulf drainages of Louisiana and Mississippi. Populations of this species appear to be stable, within its limited range.

It was formerly classified under Quadrula, but in 2012 it was moved to Rotundaria based on genetic evidence.
