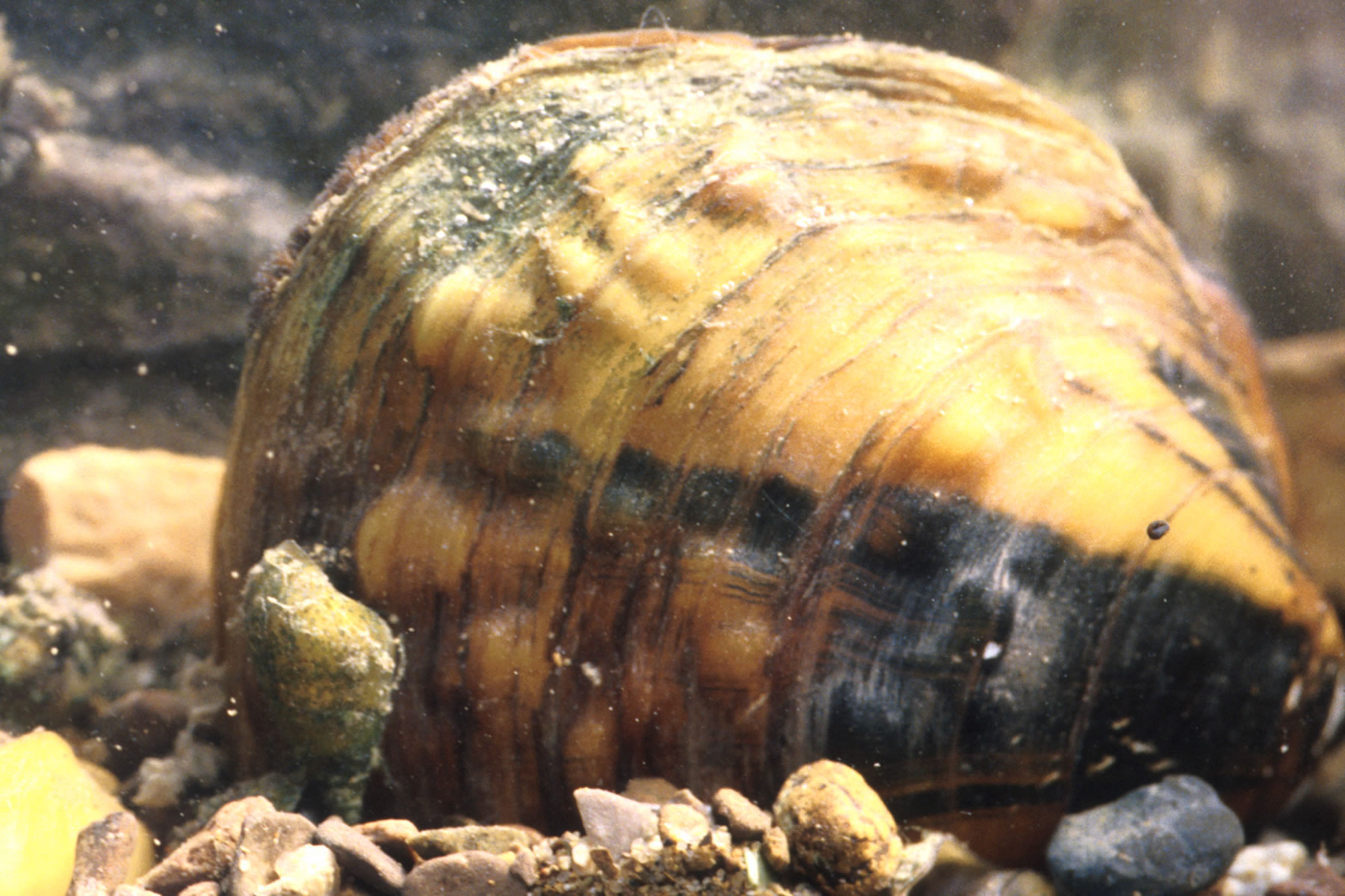

Conservation status
- Least Concern (IUCN 3.1)

- Secure (NatureServe)

Scientific classification
- Kingdom: Animalia
- Phylum: Mollusca
- Class: Bivalvia
- Order: Unionida
- Family: Unionidae
- Genus: Cyclonaias
- Species: C. pustulosa

Binomial name
- Cyclonaias pustulosa (I. Lea, 1831)

Synonyms
- Amphinaias pustulosa (I. Lea, 1831); Quadrula pustulosa (I. Lea, 1831); Rotundaria pustulosa (I. Lea, 1831)

= Cyclonaias pustulosa =

Species of bivalve

Cyclonaias pustulosa, the pimpleback, is a species of freshwater mussel, an aquatic bivalve mollusk in the family Unionidae, the river mussels. This species is native to North America, where it is widespread and common. It has possibly been extirpated from New York, however, and populations in Pennsylvania are critically imperiled, according to NatureServe.

The species was formerly classified within the genus Quadrula, and in 2012 it was moved to Rotundaria based on genetic evidence.

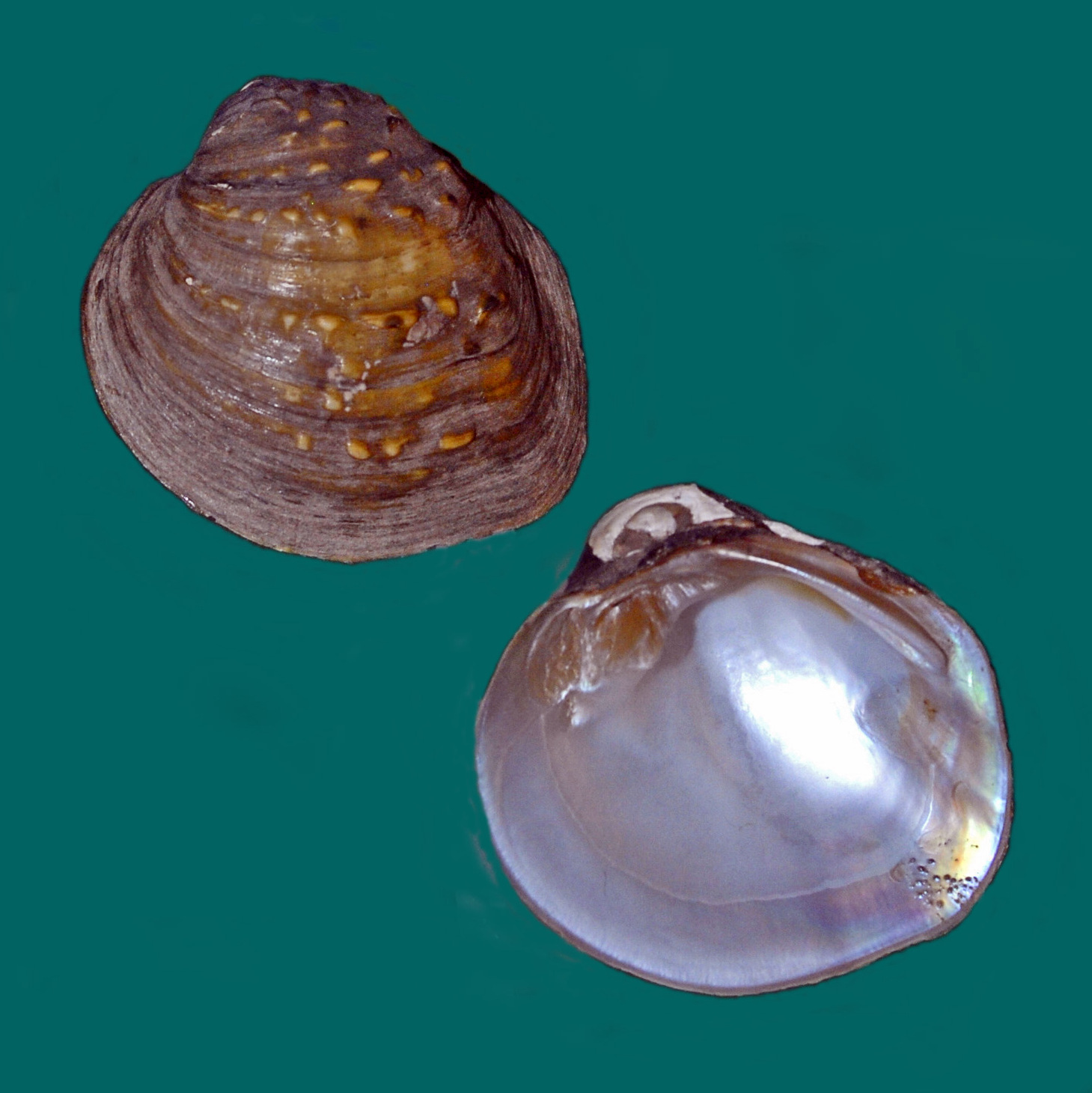
A view of valves of Rotundaria pustulosa
