= Theliderma stapes =

Conservation status
- Presumed Extinct (NatureServe)

- Extinct (ESA)

Scientific classification
- Kingdom: Animalia
- Phylum: Mollusca
- Class: Bivalvia
- Order: Unionida
- Family: Unionidae
- Genus: Theliderma
- Species: T. stapes

Binomial name
- Theliderma stapes (Lea, 1831)

Synonyms
- Quadrula stapes (Lea, 1831); Unio stapes Lea, 1831

Species of bivalve

Theliderma stapes, the stirrup shell or stirrupshell, was a species of bivalve in the family Unionidae. It was endemic to eastern Mississippi and western Alabama in the United States. It was last observed in 1987 and was proposed for delisting due to extinction by the US Fish and Wildlife Service in 2021. It was officially declared extinct on October 16, 2023.

== Conservation ==
This species experienced a population collapse primarily due to river modification in the form of canal construction. In 1976, it was predicted that the construction of the Tennessee–Tombigbee Waterway would cause the extinction of this species. This prediction would quickly come to fruition after the waterway was completed in 1984. Freshly dead shells of this species were last observed in 1987 and further surveys have failed to find any evidence of a surviving population.

In 2021, it was proposed to delist this species from the Endangered Species Act. This is done when further efforts to recover a species would almost certainly be futile, and there is no evidence of currently surviving individuals. The species was delisted effective November 16, 2023.
