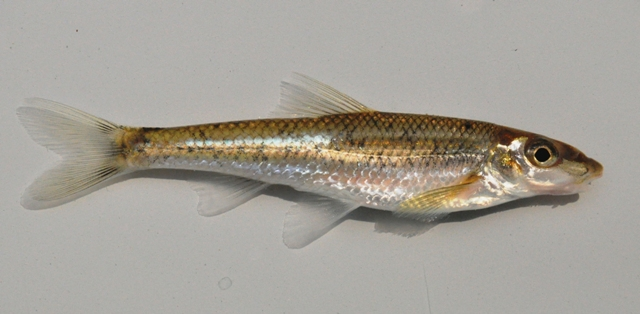

Conservation status
- Least Concern (IUCN 3.1)

Scientific classification
- Kingdom: Animalia
- Phylum: Chordata
- Class: Actinopterygii
- Order: Cypriniformes
- Family: Leuciscidae
- Subfamily: Pogonichthyinae
- Genus: Erimystax
- Species: E. x-punctatus

Binomial name
- Erimystax x-punctatus (C. L. Hubbs & Crowe, 1956)

Synonyms
- Hybopsis x-punctata Hubbs & Crowe, 1956; Hybopsis x-punctata trautmani Hubbs & Crowe, 1956

= Gravel chub =

Species of fish

The gravel chub, also known as the spotted chub (Erimystax x-punctatus), is a species of freshwater ray-finned fish belonging to the family Leuciscidae, the shiners, daces and minnows. This species of fish has a spotted distribution inhabiting various small rivers and streams in North America. The gravel chub requires a highly specific clean habitat making it vulnerable to various types of pollutants and in need of conservation efforts.

== Description ==
The gravel chub is a medium-sized minnow usually smaller than 10 cm. Its slender body is colored silver with an olive tint on the back and a white tint on the front, followed by a crosshatch pattern all over the scales. The gravel chub is often misidentified as the streamline chub, the gravel chub can be distinguished from the streamline by the more defined crosshatch marking and lack of dark blotches along the lateral line, which runs straight from the anterior to posterior end of the fish. The gravel chub is also defined by its subterminal jaw with barbels extending from both of the upper and lower maxillary jaw bone. Their outer covering consists of small bony-ridged, cycloid scales (40–43 of these scales run along the lateral line) and a forked homocercal tail. Gravel Chubs are soft ray-finned fish and have no adipose fin. The pectoral fins are pointed made up of approximately 13–16 rays and located relatively low on the body, typical of primitive species. The pelvic fins are rounded, made up of eight rays and located further back posterior to the dorsal fin in the abdominal position. The caudal fin is moderately forked and pointed.

== Distribution and habitat ==
Gravel chubs are mainly found in the Northeastern parts of North America, but there have also been reports of populations in Ontario's Thames river, but not since 1958. Studies in both the 1970s and 1980s of the Thames River further confirmed this. In North America its distribution has been described as spotty, expanding from south-central Arkansas to southern Minnesota and out towards western New York. In many states the fish is only seen in certain bodies of water. Examples of this is in New York where the species are only found in the drainage of Allegheny River, or in Minnesota where the gravel chub is limited to two drainage rivers of the Mississippi River: the Root River and the Upper Iowa River. In Wisconsin the gravel chub are confined to the lower Rock River including the lower Pecatonica River, lower Sugar River and the main channel.

Gravel chubs inhabit select small rivers and medium to large creeks and streams. They are commonly seen gathered in slightly turbulent areas of water called a riffle. They can be found in the summer in water around 18 °C to 25 °C. They prefer long flat areas in river and stream beds and can also be found at the tail of rapids and head of pools where riffles are most common. They prefer bottom with fine limestone gravel and other pea-sized rocks. Gravel chubs are only found in clear, clean water and are intolerant to excess silt and debris. They are more often found in areas with limited macrophytes and larger root aquatic plants, algae and moss. Because of their need of a specialized clean habitats, the gravel chub is especially vulnerable to various forms of pollution, especially from agriculture practices that create erosion and excessive silt. In past sampling surveys the gravel chub had been found as far north in the Upper Iowa River as Le Roy, Minnesota, but because of excessive amounts of sewage, pesticides and sedimentation of rocks and sand, this is no longer the case. The presence of gravel chubs in a body of water is an indication of good water quality in the area.

== Diet ==
The gravel chub has a pointier snout that allows it to probe the bottom of their habitat in search of small plant particles, desmids, diatoms, and tiny aquatic insects. Gravel chubs have a high density of taste buds on their snouts increasing their sensitivity to taste, which they use to locate their prey.

== Reproduction ==
Little is known about the biological life cycle of the gravel chub. Studies of populations in Kansas indicate that spawning occurs in early spring, while in surveys of Minnesota waters, indicate spawning starting in May and continuing into June. Adult gravel chubs have been spotted spawning by gathering on gravel bars in soft currents created by a rise in the waterline after hard rains.

== Conservation status and management ==
The gravel chub is considered a threatened species in many areas mostly due to the fact that it has a highly specific, clean habitat need. As of 1988 it was considered endangered in Kansas, under legal protection in Indiana and Wisconsin and considered a special concern in Kentucky, Minnesota and New York. Gravel chubs need constant mild currents with silt free riffles. Agriculture run-off is the biggest threat to this type of habitat, increasing the turbidity of the current and the amount of silt in rivers and streams. Populations in southern Minnesota are experiencing a great amount of stress due to the large amount sediment deposit from the Mississippi River that disturbs flow regimes. The Minnesota DNR has been continuing to monitor and improve water quality of rivers and streams in southern Minnesota. Iowa and New York also have put extra conservation efforts towards the gravel chub. In Iowa the gravel chub was once threatened, but now abundant all over the state. In New York there has been a strong push by the New York State Department of Environmental Conservation to establish a bigger, self-sustaining population in the Allegheny River drainage basin by restocking and monitoring the gravel chub in the area. In order for conservation efforts to continue, more research needs to be done regarding the life cycle, genetics, and identification of habitat stressors. A better understanding of this species is vital to establishing a proper conservation management plan for the gravel chub.
