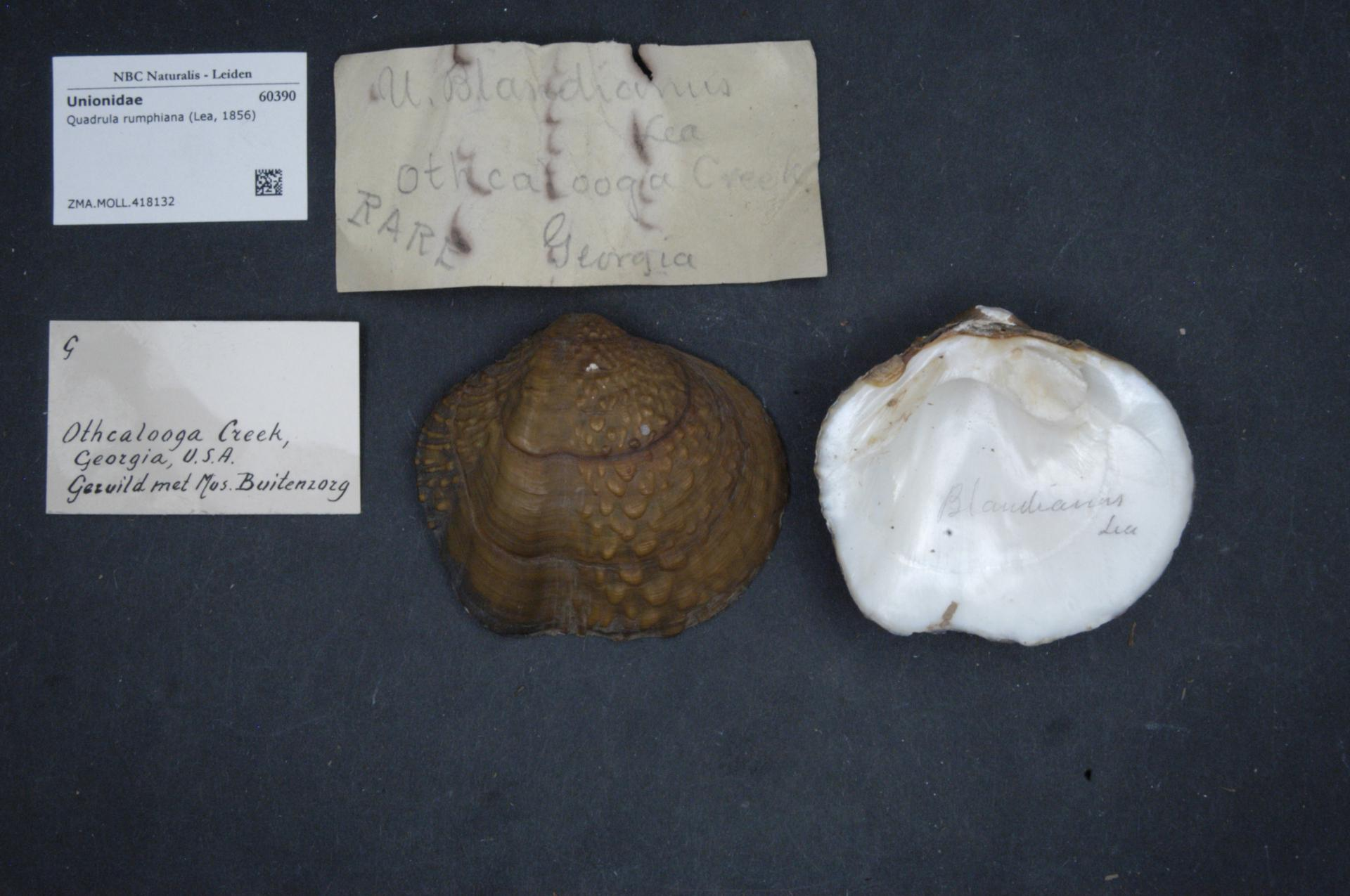
- Quadrula rumphiana (, 1856)

Conservation status
- Least Concern (IUCN 3.1)

Scientific classification
- Kingdom: Animalia
- Phylum: Mollusca
- Class: Bivalvia
- Order: Unionida
- Family: Unionidae
- Genus: Quadrula
- Species: Q. rumphiana

Binomial name
- Quadrula rumphiana (I. Lea, 1852)

= Quadrula rumphiana =

Species of bivalve

Quadrula rumphiana, the ridged mapleleaf, is a species of freshwater mussel, an aquatic bivalve mollusk in the family Unionidae, the river mussels.

This species is endemic to the United States.
