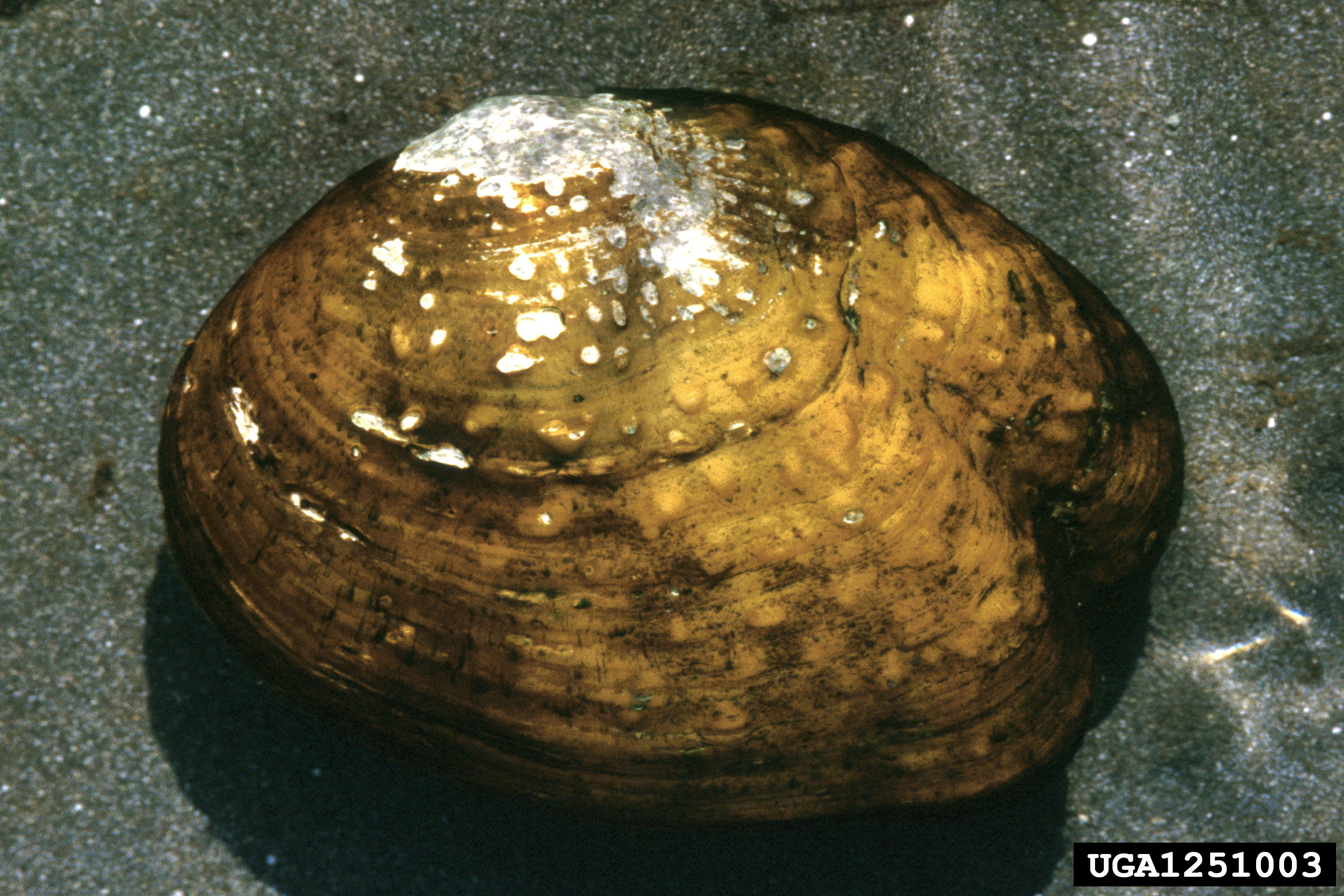

Conservation status
- Critically Endangered (IUCN 2.3)
- CITES Appendix I

Scientific classification
- Kingdom: Animalia
- Phylum: Mollusca
- Class: Bivalvia
- Order: Unionida
- Family: Unionidae
- Genus: Theliderma
- Species: T. sparsa

Binomial name
- Theliderma sparsa (Lea, 1841)

Synonyms
- Quadrula sparsa (I. Lea, 1841); Margaron (Unio) sparsus (I.Lea, 1841); Margaron (Unio) sparus (I.Lea, 1841); Quadrula tuberosa subsp. sparsa (I.Lea, 1841); Unio sparsus I.Lea, 1841

= Theliderma sparsa =

Species of bivalve

Theliderma sparsa, the Appalachian Rockshell pearly mussel or Appalachian rockshell, is a species of freshwater mussel, an aquatic bivalve mollusk in the family Unionidae, the river mussels.

This species is endemic to western Virginia and eastern Tennessee in the Appalachia region, in the Southeastern United States.

It is critically endangered due to pollution of the rivers in which it lives. Being a detritivore, the mussel absorbs the pollutants which contaminate the river as it feeds.

== Distribution ==
There are two to three populations remaining. In the Clinch River of Virginia there is a small, isolated population. A population in the upper Powell River in Tennessee is nearly gone. These occurrences may not be viable. All other occurrences have been extirpated.

== Reproduction ==
Like other unionid mussels, Theliderma sparsa uses fish as an intermediate host for its glochidia (larvae). Captive breeding experiments have demonstrated that the mussel larvae can develop on the gills of blotched chub (Erimystax insignis) and streamline chub (Erimystax dissimilis). Water temperature and vibration prompt release of glochidia, according to Virginia Department of Wildlife Resources Southwest Virginia Mussel Recovery Coordinator Tim Lane.

== Conservation ==
Theliderma sparsa is a federally endangered species. It gained protection under the Endangered Species Act with this status in 1976.
