= Ozark chub =

Conservation status
- Least Concern (IUCN 3.1)

- Vulnerable (NatureServe)

Scientific classification
- Kingdom: Animalia
- Phylum: Chordata
- Class: Actinopterygii
- Order: Cypriniformes
- Family: Leuciscidae
- Subfamily: Pogonichthyinae
- Genus: Erimystax
- Species: E. harryi

Binomial name
- Erimystax harryi (C. L. Hubbs & Crowe, 1956)

Synonyms
- Hybopsis dissimilis harryi C. L. Hubbs & Crowe, 1956

Species of fish

The Ozark chub (Erimystax harryi) is a species of freshwater ray-finned fish belonging to the family Leuciscidae, the shiners, daces and minnows. It is found in medium-gradient streams in the Ozarks in Missouri and Arkansas. A petition for federal protection under the Endangered Species Act was rejected by the U.S. Fish and Wildlife Service in 2019 due to the species' continued presence in most of the waterways it is historically known from.

The Ozark chub inhabits clear, fast-flowing streams with gravel or rocky bottoms throughout the White River and Black River drainages in southern Missouri and northern Arkansas.

It prefers moderate to swift currents over gravel substrates and is most active during spring and early summer.

In contrast to other members of the genus Erimystax, the Ozark chub has a coiled intestinal tract rather than the simple S-shaped gut seen in its relatives, which has been tied to its feeding on periphytic detrital aggregates and algae.
