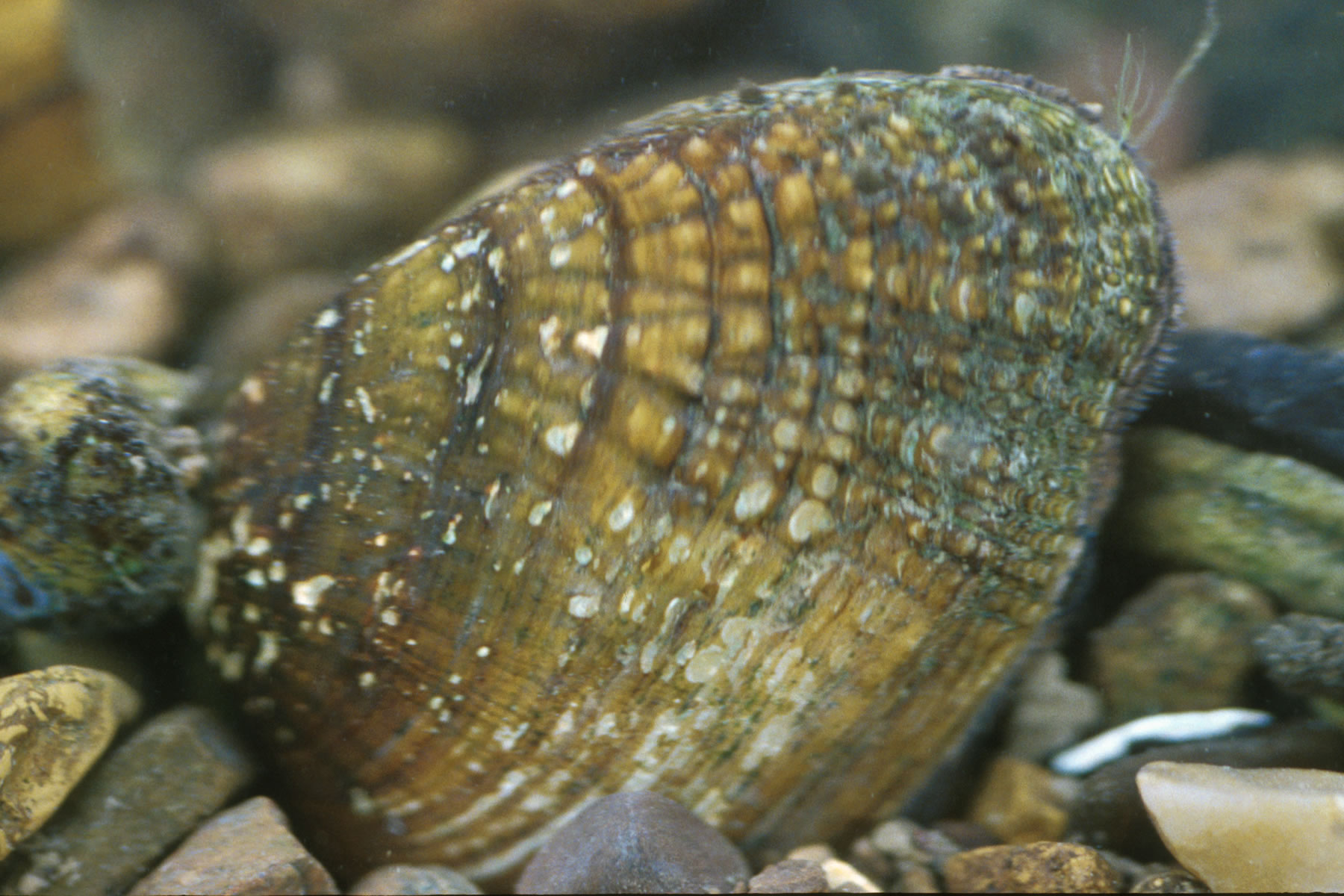

Conservation status
- Critically Endangered (IUCN 3.1)
- CITES Appendix I

Scientific classification
- Kingdom: Animalia
- Phylum: Mollusca
- Class: Bivalvia
- Order: Unionida
- Family: Unionidae
- Tribe: Lampsilini
- Genus: Lemiox; Rafinesque, 1831
- Species: L. rimosus

Binomial name
- Lemiox rimosus (Rafinesque, 1831)

Synonyms
- Conradilla caelata (Conrad, 1834); Bariosta (Lemiox) rimosus (Rafinesque, 1831); Lemiox caelatus (Conrad, 1834); Margarita (Unio) caelatus (Conrad, 1834); Margaron (Unio) caelatus (Conrad, 1834); Micromya caelata (Conrad, 1834); Unio caelatus Conrad, 1834; Unio coelatus Conrad, 1834; Unio (Lemiox) rimosus Rafinesque, 1831

= Birdwing pearlymussel =

Species of bivalve

The birdwing pearlymussel (Lemiox rimosus) is a rare species of freshwater mussel in the family Unionidae, the river mussels. This aquatic bivalve is native to Tennessee and Virginia in the United States. Its range has declined over 90%. It is a federally listed endangered species of the United States.

This mussel remains in three rivers in Tennessee and Virginia, the Duck, Clinch, and Powell Rivers, having been extirpated from many more. It is now extinct in the state of Alabama.

Failed efforts to transplant the birdwing pearly mussel and the Cumberland monkeyface pearly mussel (Theliderma intermedia), also endangered, to local streams brought an end to construction on the half-completed and long-contested Columbia Dam on the Duck River in 1983.

The greenside darter (Etheostoma blennioides) is an important host species for the birdwing pearly mussel's glochidia larvae. The mussel attracts the darter with a lure that looks like an aquatic snail. The glochidia release triggered by the darter's interaction with the lure directs the glochidia to attachment sites on the fish's gills. After a variable amount of time, often as long as one-and-a-half to two months, the glochidia metamorphose into mussels and drop off the fish onto substrate. Glochidia survival to metamorphosis is optimal at relatively colder water temperatures than those preferred by other unionid species and their hosts.
