= Southern mapleleaf =

Scientific classification
- Domain: Eukaryota
- Kingdom: Animalia
- Phylum: Mollusca
- Class: Bivalvia
- Order: Unionida
- Family: Unionidae
- Genus: Quadrula
- Species: Q. apiculata

Binomial name
- Quadrula apiculata (Say, 1829)

Species of bivalve

The southern mapleleaf (Quadrula apiculata) is a species of freshwater mussel, an aquatic bivalve mollusk in the family Unionidae, the river mussels.

This species is endemic to the United States.
