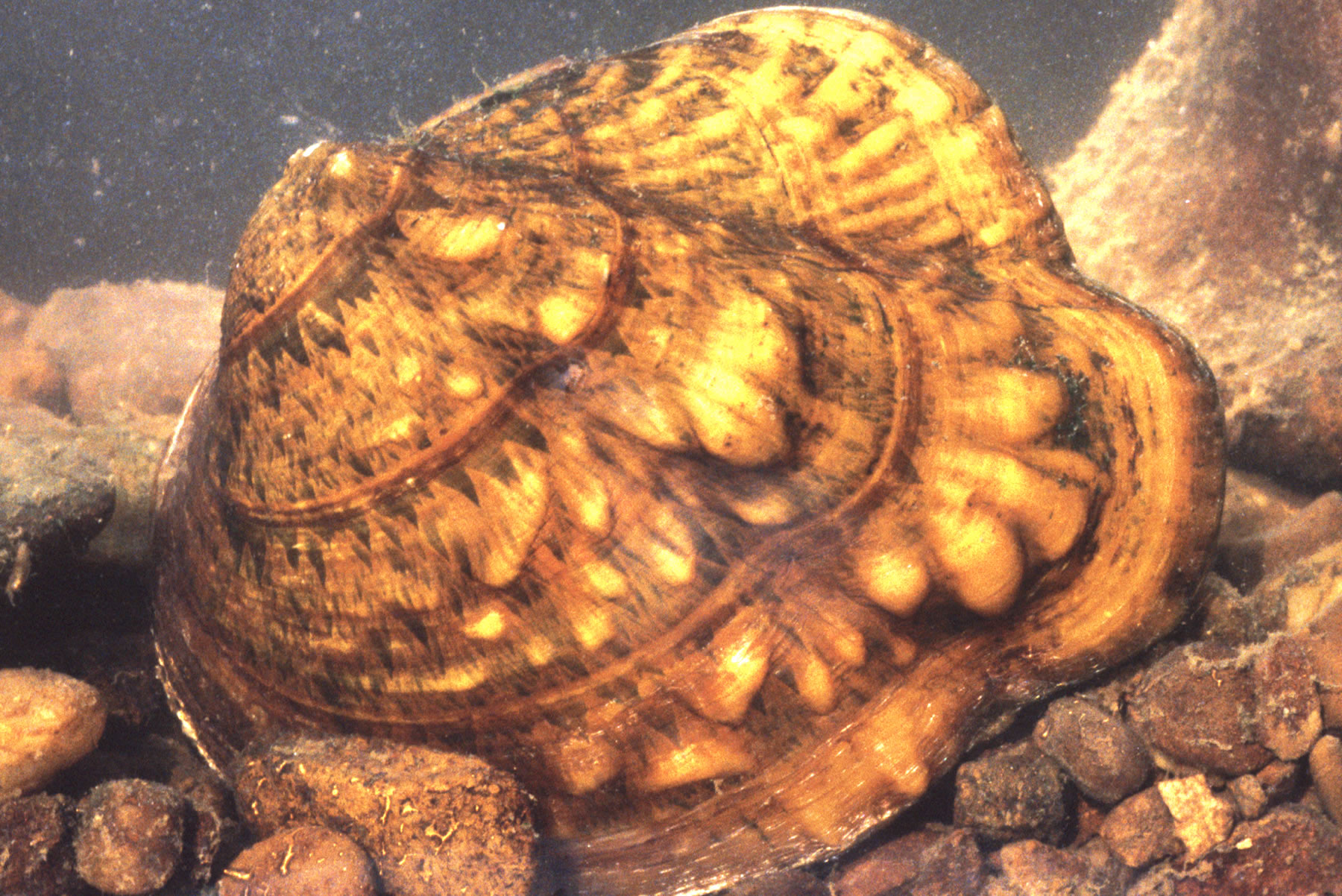
- Theliderma metanevra

Scientific classification
- Kingdom: Animalia
- Phylum: Mollusca
- Class: Bivalvia
- Order: Unionida
- Family: Unionidae
- Tribe: Quadrulini
- Genus: Theliderma; Swainson, 1840

Species
- See text

= Theliderma =

Genus of bivalves

Theliderma is a genus of freshwater mussels, aquatic bivalve mollusks in the family Unionidae. They are native to North America.

This genus is sometimes classified in an expanded Quadrula.

== Species within the genus Theliderma ==
Note: Taxa with a "†" symbol are extinct due to human activity

- Theliderma cylindrica - Rabbitsfoot
- Theliderma intermedia - Cumberland monkeyface
- Theliderma metanevra - Monkeyface
- Theliderma sparsa - Appalachian monkeyface
- †Theliderma stapes - Stirrup shell
- †Theliderma tuberosa - Rough rockshell
- Theliderma johnsoni - Southern rockshell
