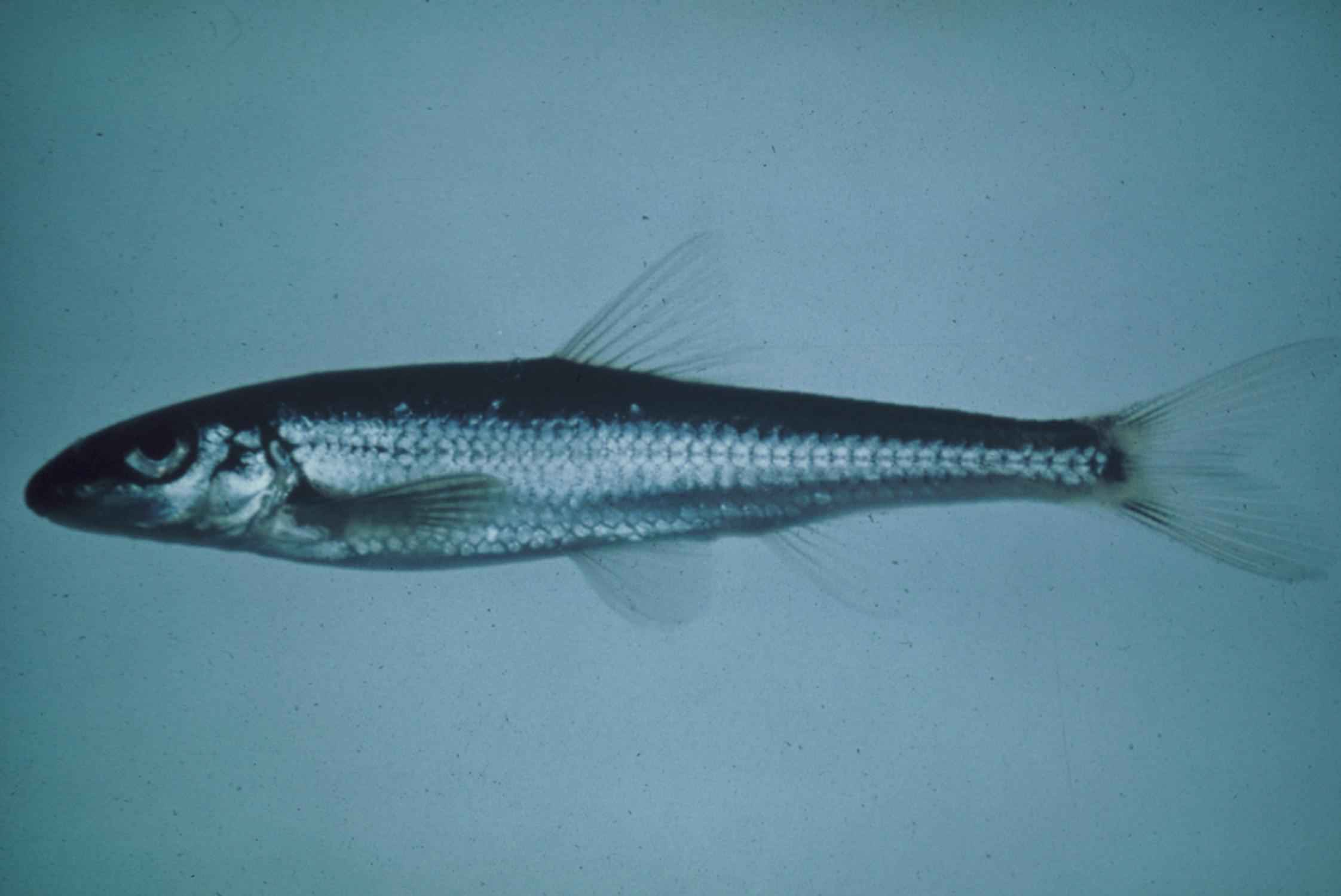
- Slender chub (Erimystax cahni)

Scientific classification
- Kingdom: Animalia
- Phylum: Chordata
- Class: Actinopterygii
- Order: Cypriniformes
- Family: Leuciscidae
- Subfamily: Pogonichthyinae
- Genus: Erimystax; Jordan, 1882

Type species
- Luxilus dissimilis Kirtland, 1840

= Erimystax =

Genus of fishes

Erimystax is a genus of freshwater ray-finned fish elonging to the family Leuciscidae, the shiners, daces and minnows. Members are commonly known as slender chubs, though "slender chub" is also used for individual species local to some area, particularly Erimystax cahni.

== Species ==
- Erimystax cahni (C. L. Hubbs & Crowe, 1956) (slender chub)
- Erimystax dissimilis (Kirtland, 1840) (streamline chub)
- Erimystax harryi (C. L. Hubbs & Crowe, 1956) (Ozark chub)
- Erimystax insignis (C. L. Hubbs & Crowe, 1956) (blotched chub)
- Erimystax x-punctatus (C. L. Hubbs & Crowe, 1956) (gravel chub)
