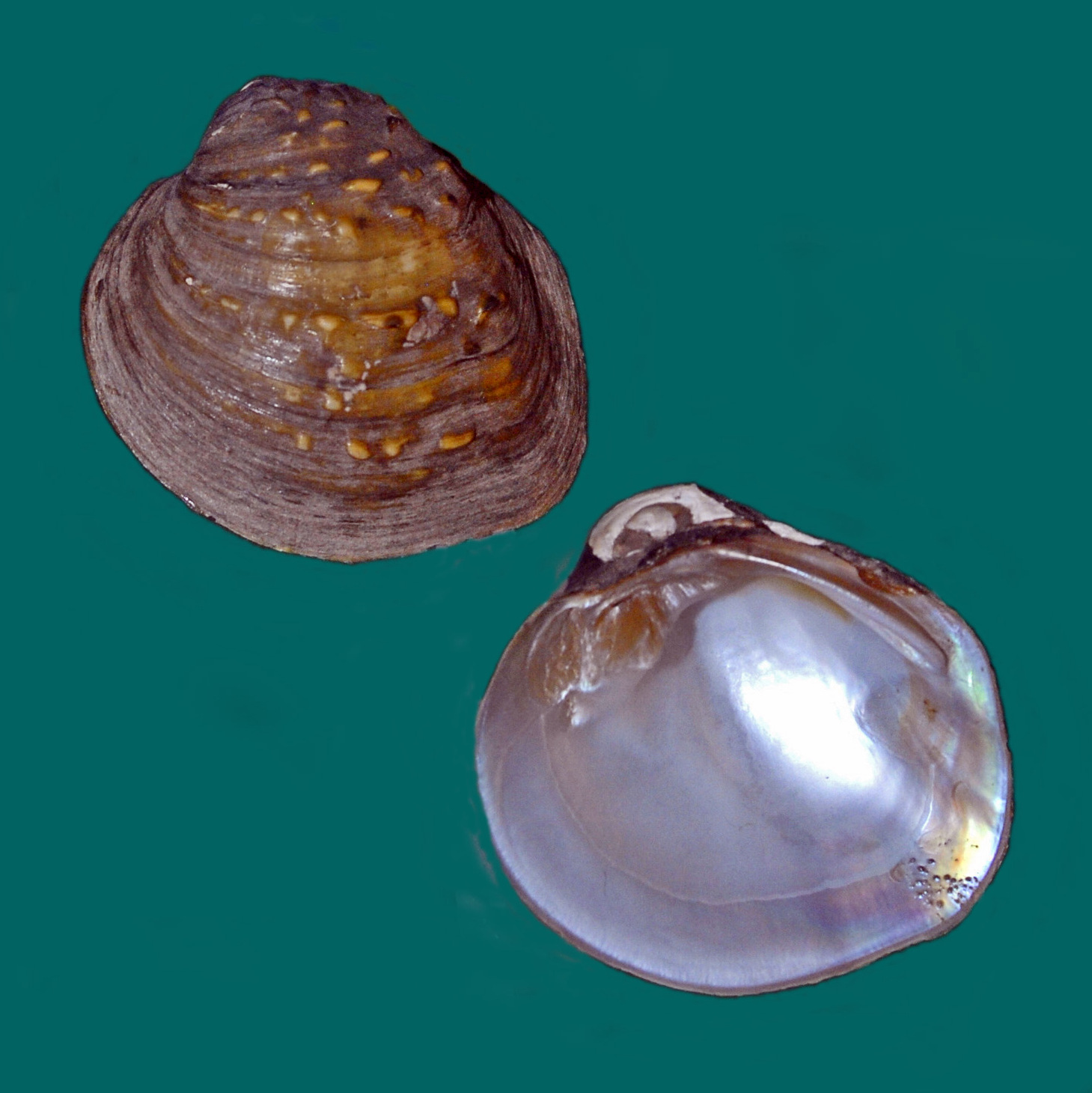
- Rotundaria pustulosa

Scientific classification
- Domain: Eukaryota
- Kingdom: Animalia
- Phylum: Mollusca
- Class: Bivalvia
- Order: Unionida
- Family: Unionidae
- Genus: Rotundaria; Rafinesque, 1820

= Rotundaria =

Genus of bivalves

Rotundaria is a genus of freshwater mussels, aquatic bivalve mollusks in the family Unionidae, the river mussels.

== Species ==
Species within this genus include:

- Rotundaria asperata (I. Lea, 1861)
- Rotundaria aurea (I. Lea, 1859)
- Rotundaria couchiana (I. Lea, 1860)
- Rotundaria houstonensis (I. Lea, 1859)
- Rotundaria infucata (Conrad, 1834)
- Rotundaria kieneriana (I. Lea, 1852)
- Rotundaria kleiniana (I. Lea, 1852)
- Rotundaria nodulata (Rafinesque, 1820)
- Rotundaria petrina (Gould, 1855)
- Rotundaria pustulosa (I. Lea, 1831)
- Rotundaria refulgens (I. Lea, 1868)
- Rotundaria succissa (I. Lea, 1852)
- Rotundaria tuberculata (Rafinesque, 1820)
