= Rotundaria couchiana =

Conservation status
- Critically Endangered (IUCN 2.3)

- Possibly Extinct (NatureServe)

Scientific classification
- Kingdom: Animalia
- Phylum: Mollusca
- Class: Bivalvia
- Order: Unionida
- Family: Unionidae
- Genus: Rotundaria
- Species: R. couchiana

Binomial name
- Rotundaria couchiana (I. Lea, 1860)

Synonyms
- Quadrula couchiana (I. Lea, 1860)

Species of freshwater mussel from North America, possibly extinct

Rotundaria couchiana, the Rio Grande monkeyface, is a species of freshwater mussel. It is native to Chihuahua, Mexico and New Mexico and Texas in the United States.

This species experienced a tremendous decline due to habitat destruction in the 1800s. The last confirmed living individual was seen near Brackettville, Texas in 1898. This species is likely extinct, although there is the slim possibility that it could persist in poorly surveyed regions on the Rio Grande drainage.

It was formerly classified under Quadrula, but in 2012 it was moved to Rotundaria based on genetic evidence.
