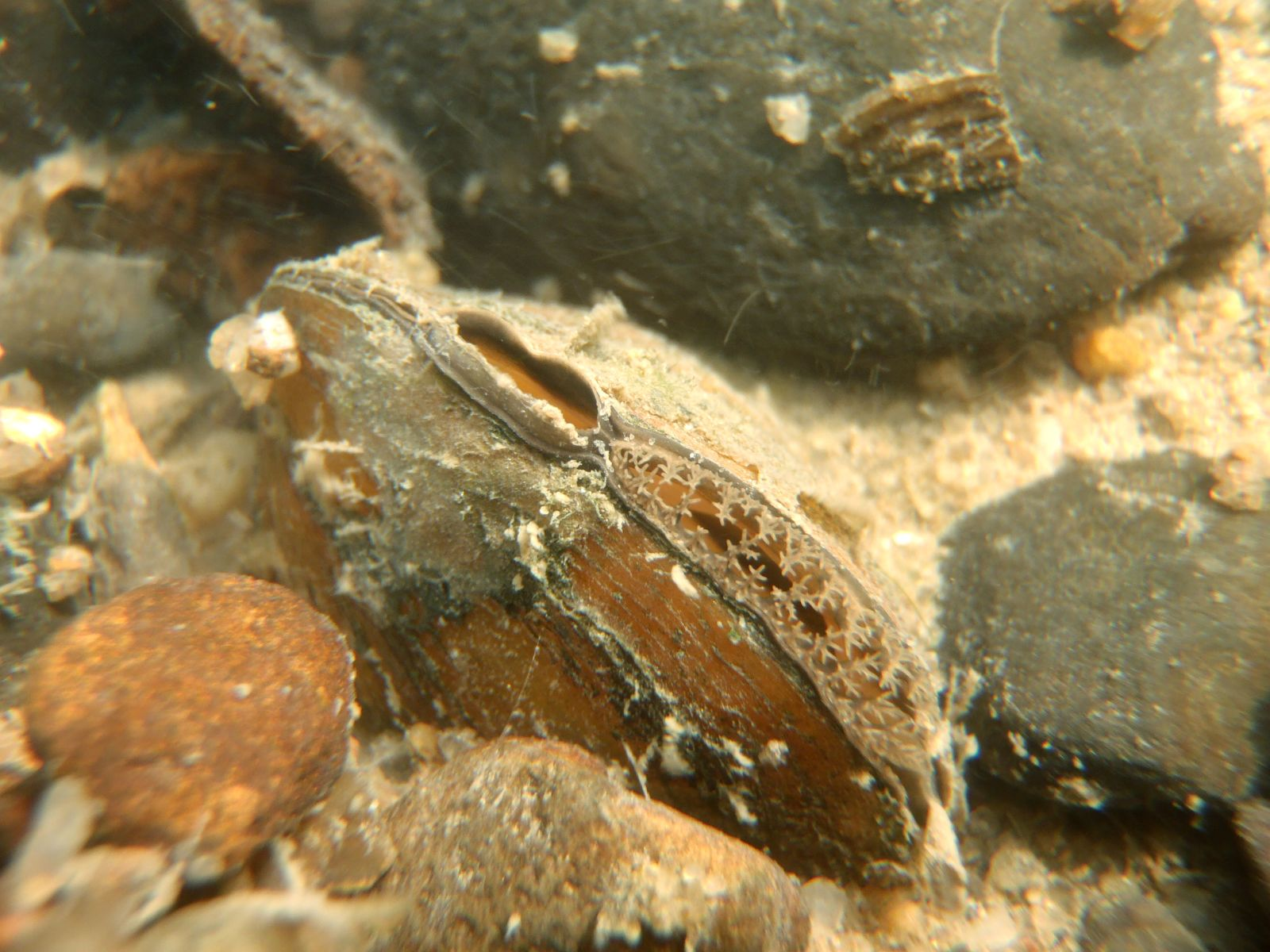

Conservation status
- Critically Imperiled (NatureServe)

Scientific classification
- Kingdom: Animalia
- Phylum: Mollusca
- Class: Bivalvia
- Order: Unionida
- Family: Unionidae
- Genus: Rotundaria
- Species: R. aurea

Binomial name
- Rotundaria aurea I. Lea, 1859

Synonyms
- Quadrula aurea (I. Lea, 1859)

= Rotundaria aurea =

Species of bivalve

Rotundaria aurea, the golden orb, is a species of freshwater mussel. It is native to the United States, where it is found only in Texas.

This species was moved from Quadrula to Rotundaria based on genetic evidence in 2012.
