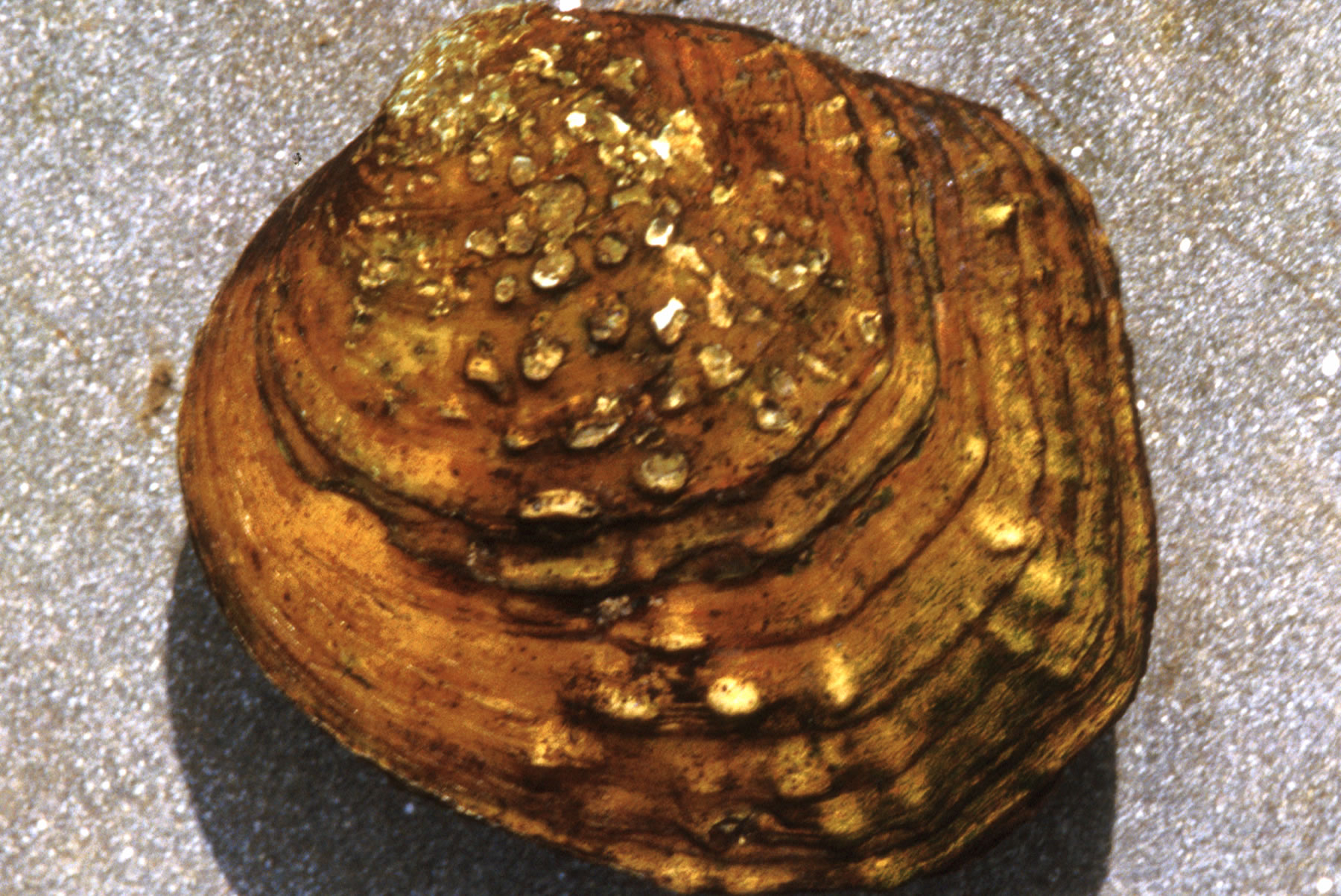

Conservation status
- Near Threatened (IUCN 3.1)

Scientific classification
- Kingdom: Animalia
- Phylum: Mollusca
- Class: Bivalvia
- Order: Unionida
- Family: Unionidae
- Genus: Rotundaria
- Species: R. tuberculata

Binomial name
- Rotundaria tuberculata (Rafinesque, 1820)

Synonyms
- Cyclonaias tuberculata (Rafinesque, 1820)

= Rotundaria tuberculata =

Species of bivalve

Rotundaria tuberculata, commonly called the purple wartyback, is a freshwater mussel, an aquatic bivalve mollusk.

This species is native to eastern North America, generally in the Mississippi River drainage, where it is wide-ranging. It is still common in many areas, particularly in the southern part of its range, but is being negatively impacted by water pollution and channelization. In the Mississippi River drainage, it is threatened by overgrowth of invasive zebra mussels (Dreissena polymorpha) and, in Canada, by predation on juvenile mussels and possibly unsuccessful development of larval glochidia on the invasive round goby (Neogobius melanostomus).

It was formerly classified as the sole species in the genus Cyclonaias, but in 2012 it was moved to Rotundaria based on genetic evidence.
