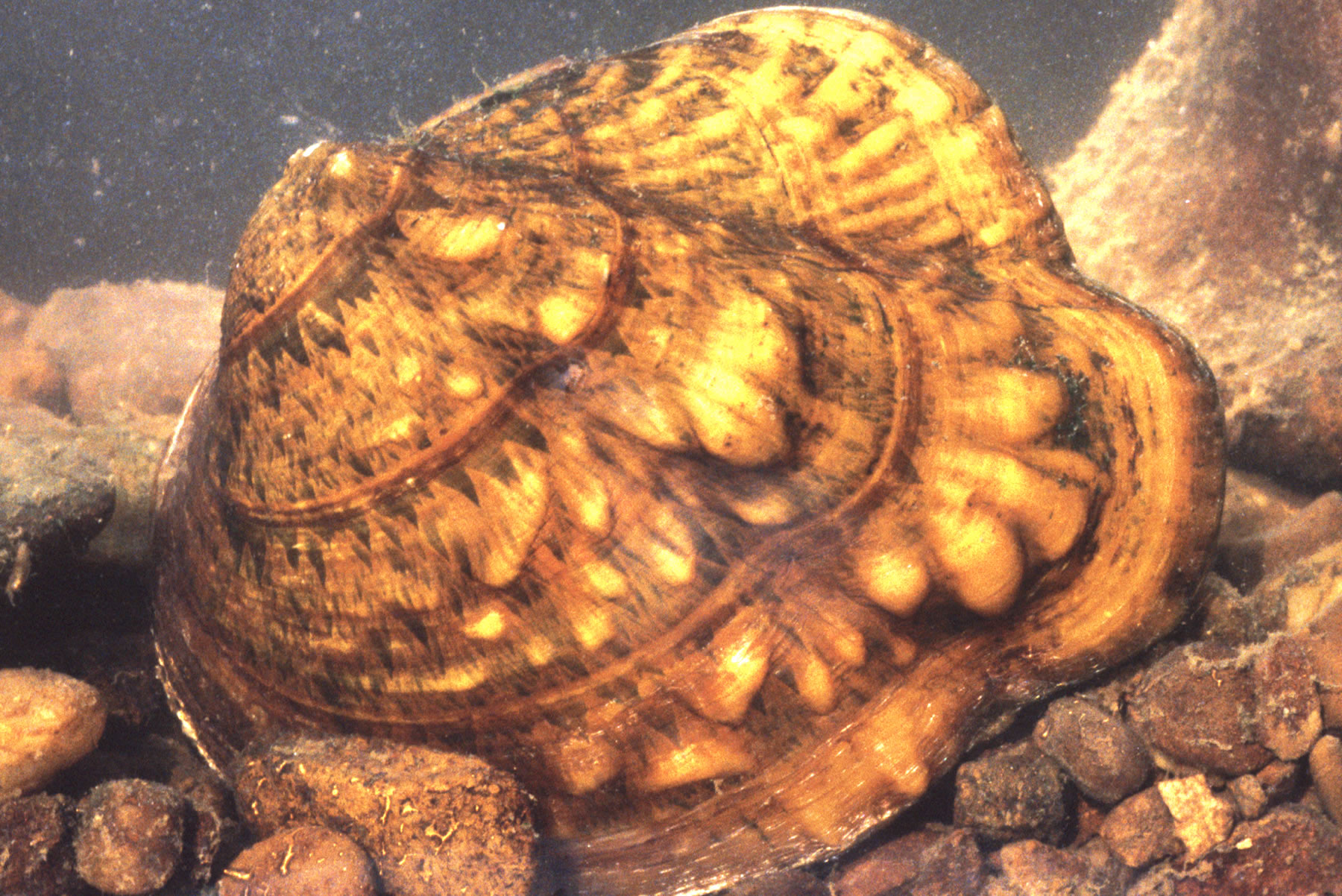

Conservation status
- Apparently Secure (NatureServe)

Scientific classification
- Domain: Eukaryota
- Kingdom: Animalia
- Phylum: Mollusca
- Class: Bivalvia
- Order: Unionida
- Family: Unionidae
- Genus: Theliderma
- Species: T. metanevra

Binomial name
- Theliderma metanevra (Rafinesque, 1820)

Synonyms
- Quadrula metanevra (Rafinesque, 1820)

= Theliderma metanevra =

Species of bivalve

Theliderma metanevra, common name the monkeyface, is a species of freshwater mussel, an aquatic bivalve mollusk in the family Unionidae, the river mussels.

It is native to the eastern United States, where it lives in large to medium-sized rivers. Although it has been extirpated from certain sections of its range, it is still widespread and fairly common.
