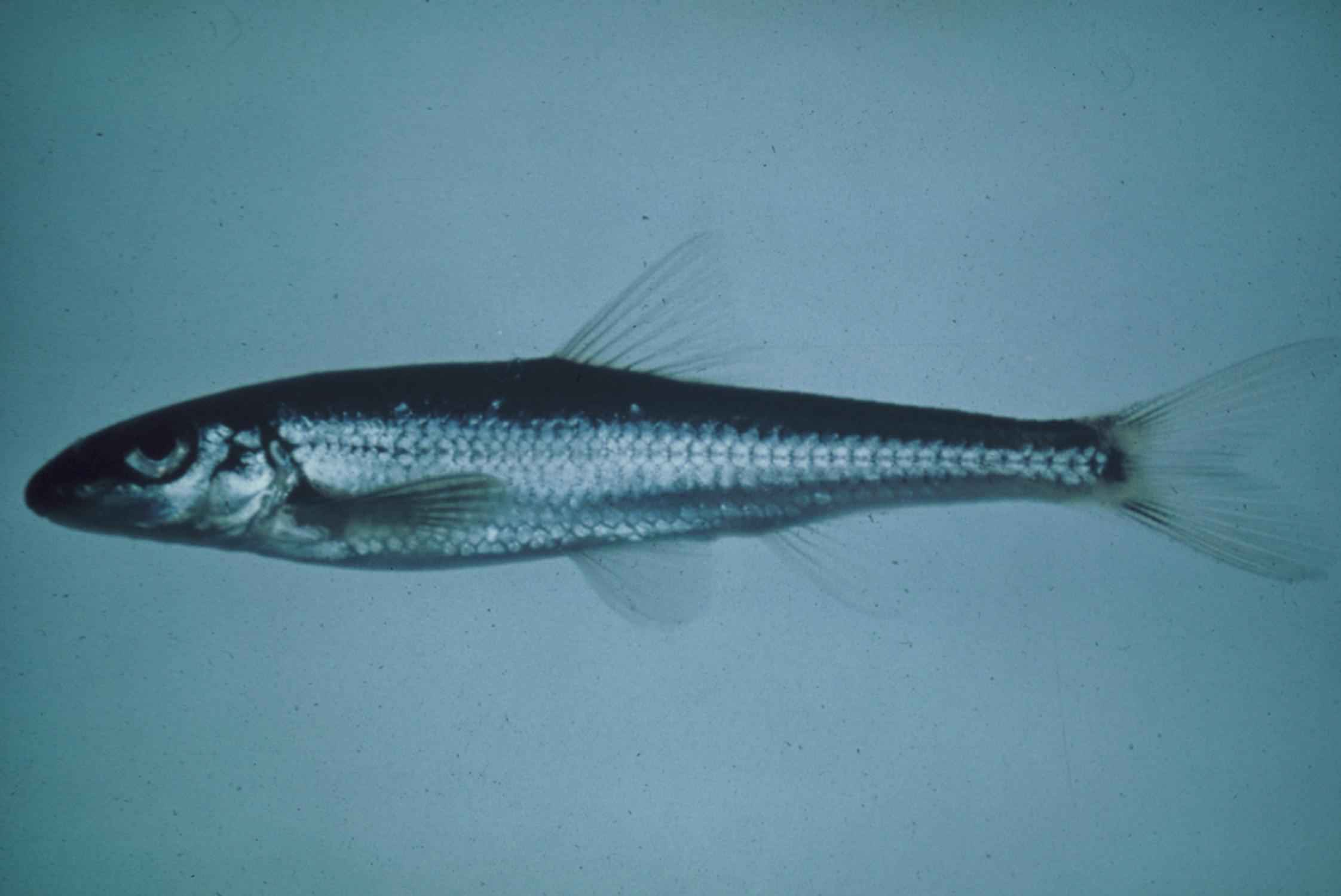

Conservation status
- Endangered (IUCN 3.1)

- Threatened (ESA)

Scientific classification
- Kingdom: Animalia
- Phylum: Chordata
- Class: Actinopterygii
- Order: Cypriniformes
- Family: Leuciscidae
- Subfamily: Pogonichthyinae
- Genus: Erimystax
- Species: E. cahni

Binomial name
- Erimystax cahni (C. L. Hubbs & Crowe, 1956)

Synonyms
- Hybopsis cahni Hubbs & Crowe, 1956

= Slender chub =

Species of fish

The slender chub (Erimystax cahni) is a species of freshwater ray-finned fish belonging to the family Leuciscidae, the shiners, daces and minnows. It is found only in the United States, within the Clinch and Powell rivers. It is likely extirpated from the Holston River, having last been observed there in 1941. Due in part to a lack of targeted surveys, slender chub have not been definitively observed since the 1990s. The 2021 5-year review of this federally threatened species recommended environmental DNA sampling in future surveys with comparison to DNA extracted from preserved specimens. Environmental DNA surveillance was conducted in 2022, and eDNA for the species was detected in both the Clinch and Powell rivers.
