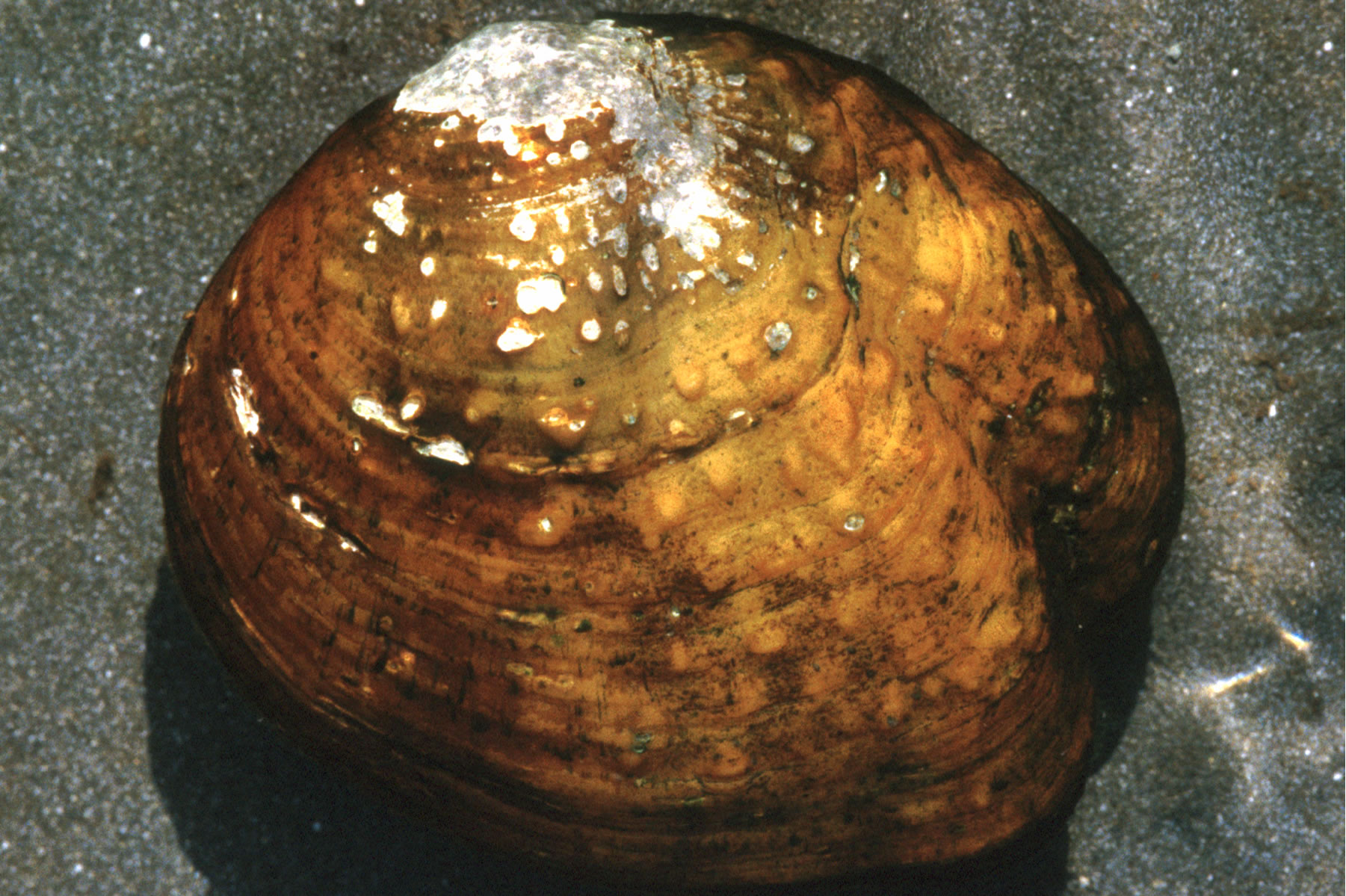

Conservation status
- Endangered (IUCN 3.1)
- CITES Appendix I

Scientific classification
- Kingdom: Animalia
- Phylum: Mollusca
- Class: Bivalvia
- Order: Unionida
- Family: Unionidae
- Genus: Theliderma
- Species: T. intermedia

Binomial name
- Theliderma intermedia (Conrad, 1836)

Synonyms
- Quadrula intermedia (Conrad, 1836); Unio intermedius Conrad, 1836; Quadrula biangulata Morrison, 1942; Unio tuberosus subsp. perlobatus de Gregorio, 1914

= Theliderma intermedia =

Species of bivalve

Theliderma intermedia, the Cumberland monkeyface pearly mussel or Cumberland monkeyface, is a species of freshwater mussel in the family Unionidae, the river mussels. This aquatic bivalve mollusk is native to Tennessee and Virginia in the United States. Historically widespread in the upper Tennessee River system, it populations have been reduced by habitat destruction and pollution. It now only occurs in two tributaries: the Duck and Powell Rivers. It is a federally listed endangered species.

This species is greenish yellow in color. It can reach at least 35 years of age. Like other mussels, it has larvae called glochidia that lodge in the gills of fish to develop into juvenile mussels. Hosts for this species include the streamline chub (Erimystax dissimilis) and blotched chub (Erimystax insignis).

This mussel has been extirpated from the Elk River. There is still a population in the Powell River, and the population in the Duck River appears to be viable.
