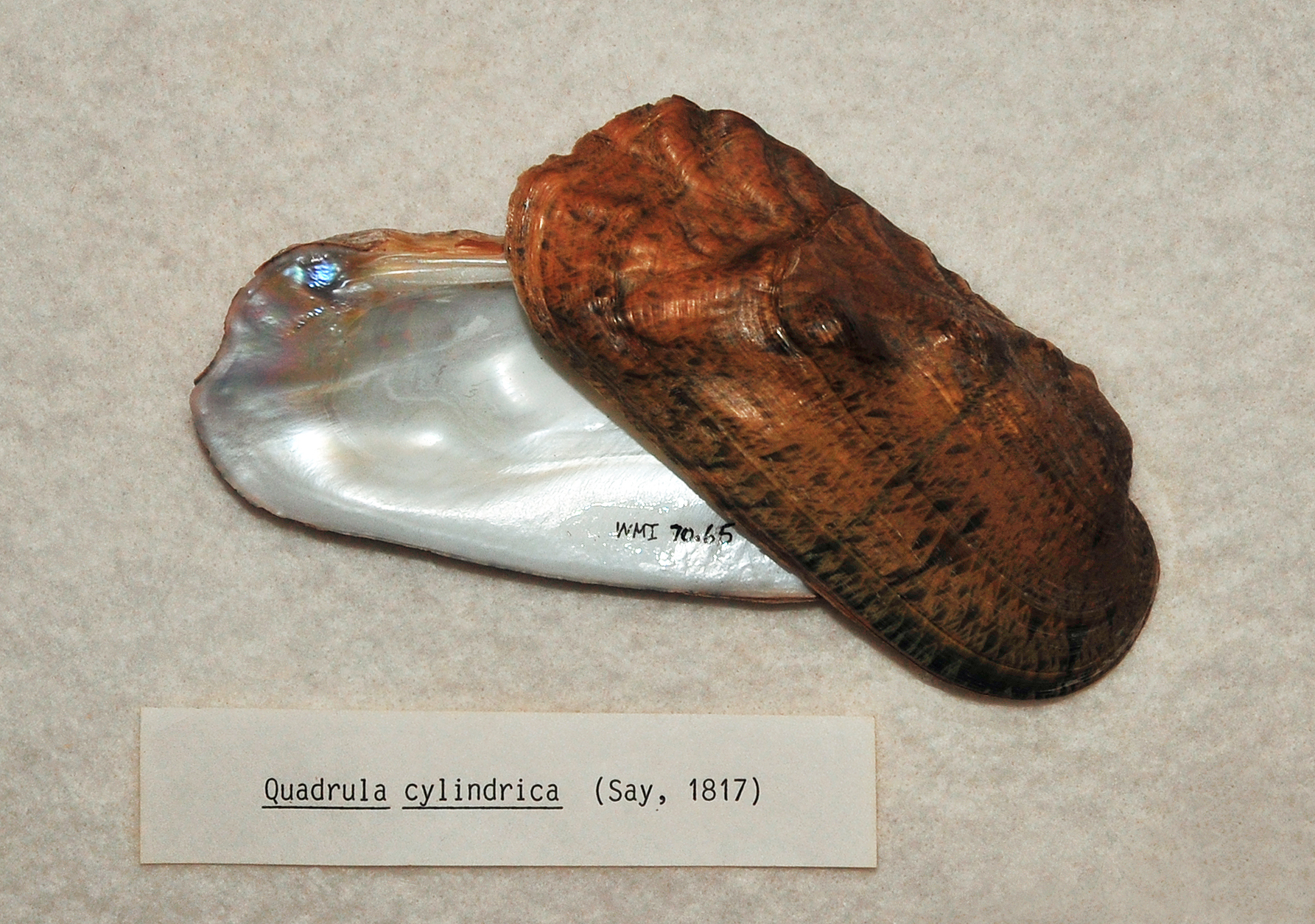
- Museum specimen

Conservation status
- Near Threatened (IUCN 3.1)

- Vulnerable (NatureServe)

Scientific classification
- Kingdom: Animalia
- Phylum: Mollusca
- Class: Bivalvia
- Order: Unionida
- Family: Unionidae
- Genus: Theliderma
- Species: T. cylindrica

Binomial name
- Theliderma cylindrica (Say, 1817)

Synonyms
- List: Quadrula cylindrica (Say, 1817); Quadrula cylindrica subsp. cylindrica (Say, 1817); Quadrula cylindrica subsp. strigillata (B.H. Wright, 1898); Unio cylindricus Say, 1817; Unio naviformis Lamarck, 1819; Unio solenoides Rafinesque, 1820; Unio solenoides subsp. nodosa Rafinesque, 1820; Unio solenoides subsp. interrupta Rafinesque, 1820; Unio cylindricus subsp. strigillatus B.H. Wright, 1898; Unio cilindricus subsp. propetipicus de Gregorio, 1914; Unio cilindricus subsp. acrispatus de Gregorio, 1914

= Rabbitsfoot =

Species of bivalve

The rabbitsfoot (Theliderma cylindrica) is a species of freshwater mussel. It is an aquatic bivalve mollusk, in the family Unionidae, the river mussels.

This species is native to the United States, where it is widespread in the drainages of the Ohio River and the Great Lakes. It has disappeared from over half its historic range.

== Subspecies ==
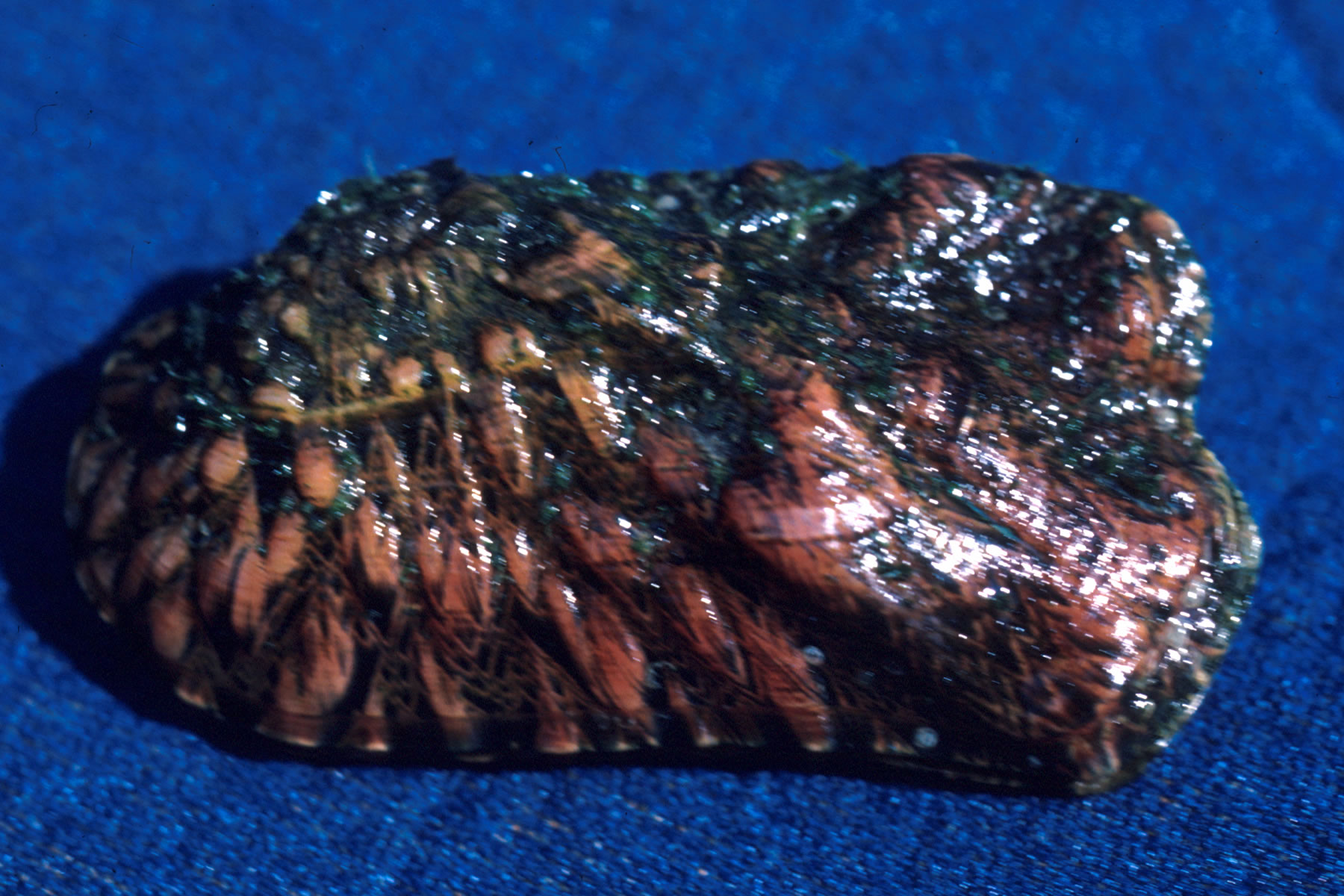
Theliderma cylindrica cylindrica

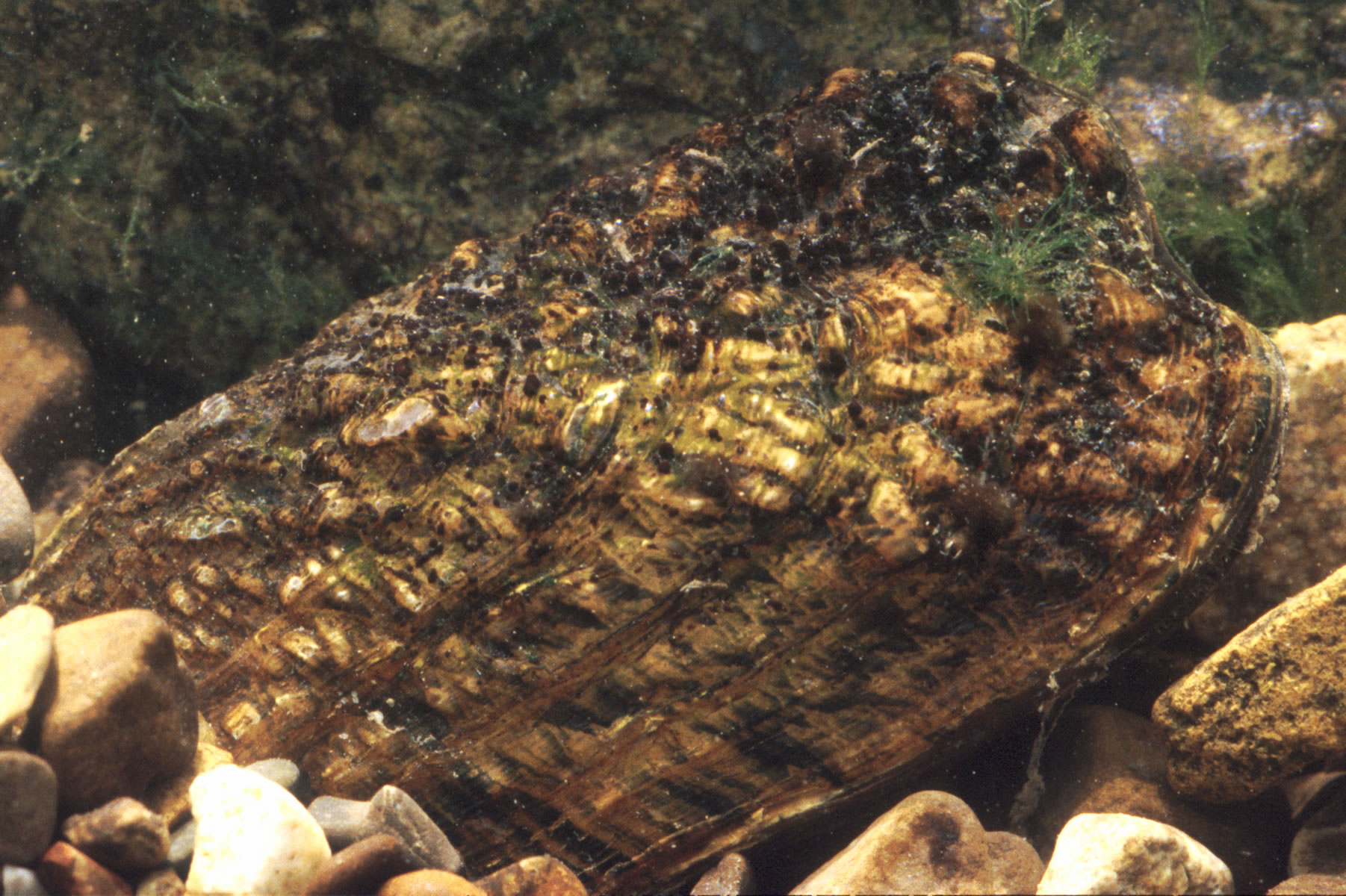
Theliderma cylindrica strigillata

Two subspecies have been described. It is unclear whether they represent distinct evolutionary lineages, or are merely ecophenotypic variation which would not warrant any taxonomic status. A 2007 genetic study has cast doubt upon the validity of the existence of two subspecies.

- Theliderma cylindrica cylindrica (Say, 1817) —
- Theliderma cylindrica strigillata (Wright, 1898) — Rough rabbitsfoot, found only in the headwaters of the Tennessee River.

== Conservation ==
Quadrula cylindrica cylindrica has been listed as an Endangered Species Act (ESA) threatened species of the United States since 2013. Quadrula cylindrica strigillata has been listed as an ESA endangered species since 1997.

== See also ==
- List of non-marine molluscs of the United States
