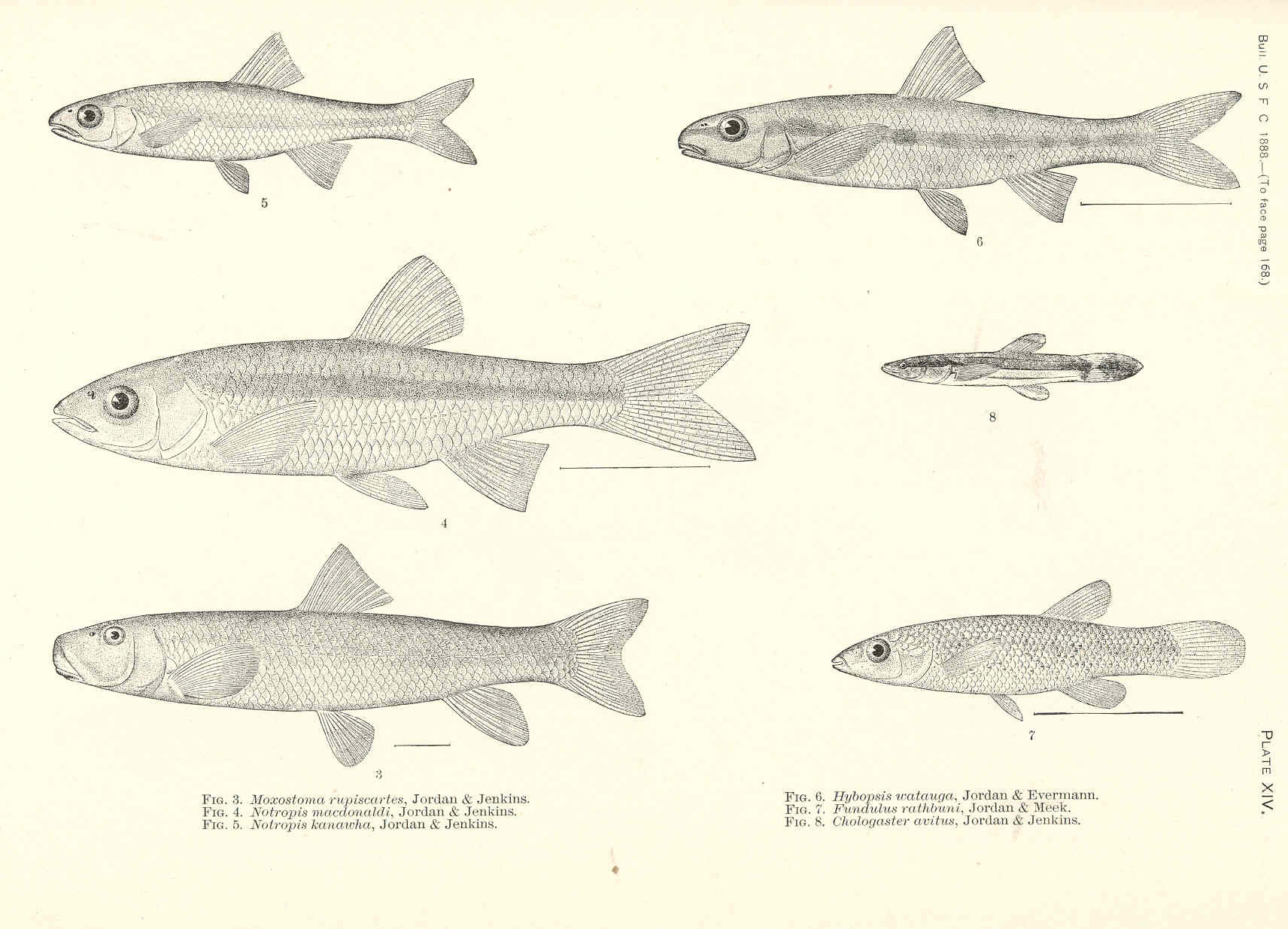
- Notropis macdonaldi, Jordan & Jenkins (Fig.4): Notropis kanawha, Jordan & Jenkins (Fig.5); Hybopsis vatauga, Jordan & Evermann (Fig.6)

Conservation status
- Least Concern (IUCN 3.1)

Scientific classification
- Kingdom: Animalia
- Phylum: Chordata
- Class: Actinopterygii
- Division: Teleostei
- Order: Cypriniformes
- Family: Leuciscidae
- Subfamily: Pogonichthyinae
- Genus: Erimystax
- Species: E. dissimilis

Binomial name
- Erimystax dissimilis (J. P. Kirtland, 1841)

Synonyms
- Luxilus dissimilis Kirtland, 1840; Hybopsis dissimilis (Kirtland, 1840); Hybopsis watauga Jordan & Evermann, 1889

= Streamline chub =

Species of fish

The streamline chub (Erimystax dissimilis) is a species of freshwater ray-finned fish belonging to the family Leuciscidae, the shiners, daces and minnows.

== Geographic distribution ==
It is found in the Ohio River basin from western New York to northern Indiana and south to northern Alabama.

It can also be found in the St. Francis and White River drainages in Missouri and Arkansas.
