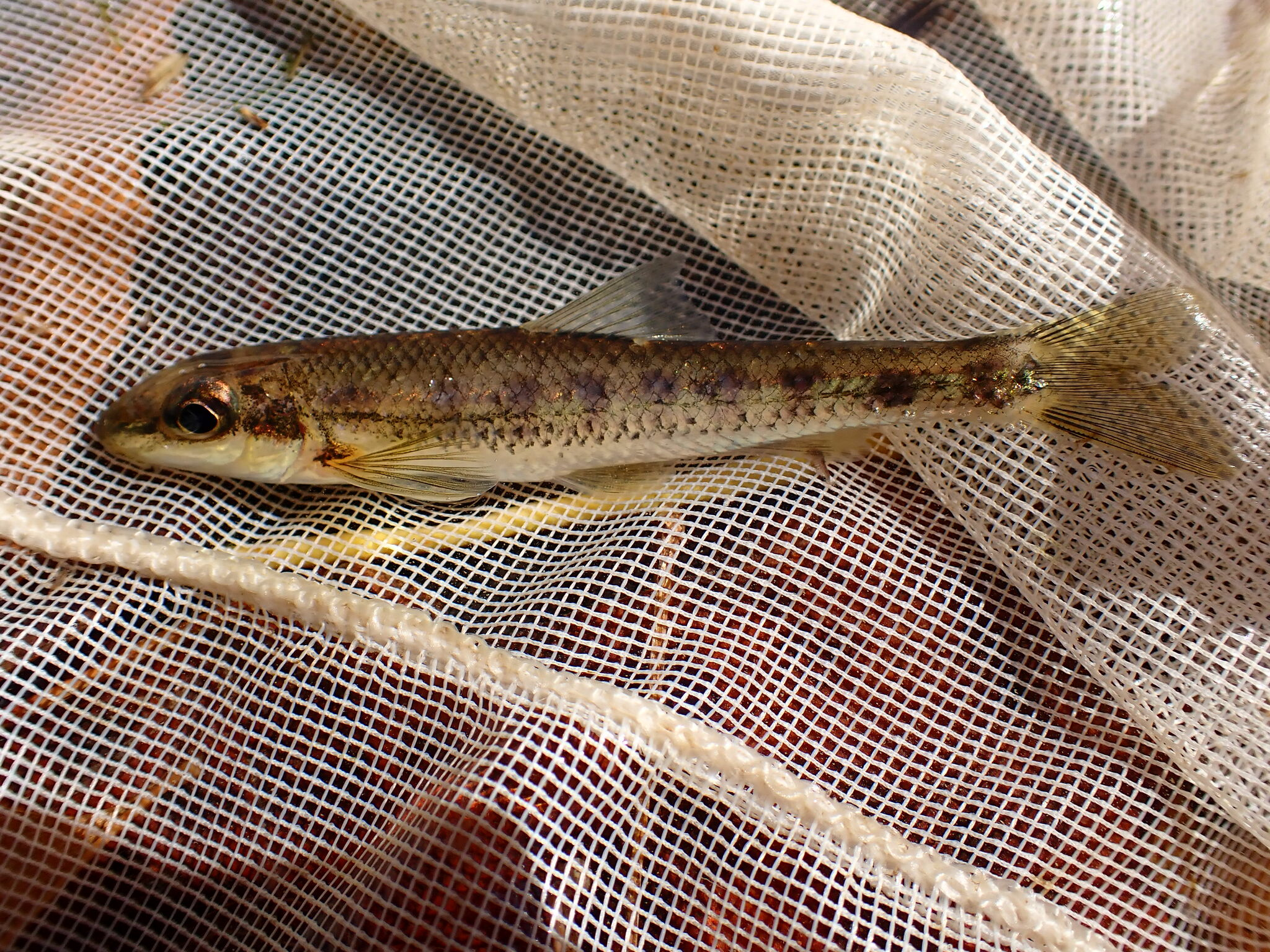
- Erimystax insignis

Conservation status
- Least Concern (IUCN 3.1)

Scientific classification
- Kingdom: Animalia
- Phylum: Chordata
- Class: Actinopterygii
- Order: Cypriniformes
- Family: Leuciscidae
- Subfamily: Pogonichthyinae
- Genus: Erimystax
- Species: E. insignis

Binomial name
- Erimystax insignis (C. L. Hubbs & Crowe, 1956)

Synonyms
- Hybopsis insignis Hubbs & Crowe, 1956

= Blotched chub =

Species of fish

The blotched chub (Erimystax insignis) is a species of freshwater ray-finned fish belonging to the family Leuciscidae, the shiners, daces and minnows. This fish species in native to the Southeastern region of the United States.

== Appearance ==
The blotched chub is a slender, silvery minnow with dark I-shaped vertical patches along the lateral portion of the body.

== Distribution and habitat ==
This species is found primarily in the Cumberland and Tennessee River drainages of southern states. Although, a subspecies is known to inhabit the Upper Tennessee and the Ridge and Valley region. The majority of the Tennessee River is inhabited by the blotched chub and its subspecies.

The blotched chub's preferred habitat is the clear riffle areas of small creeks. These areas must have plenty of substrate, which is required for this species to spawn.

== Ecology ==
Spawning season for this fish is at its highest in the months of March and April, when water temperatures reach 12–15 °C (54–59 °F). Though, this may vary from year to year depending upon factors such as, rain amounts, sedimentation, and surrounding environmental temperatures. It has been found that this species typically spawns earlier than that of others in the family Cyprinidae.
