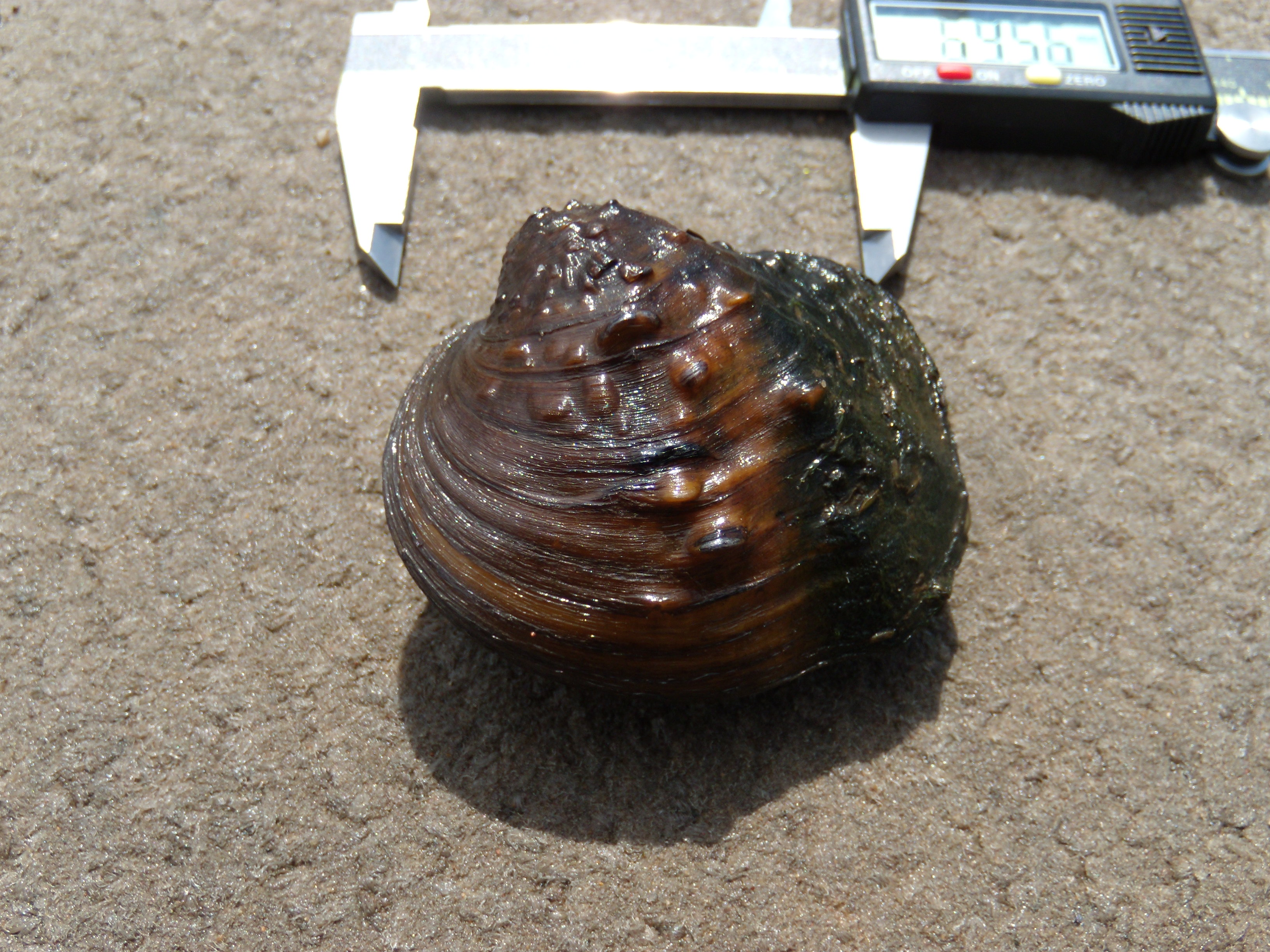
- Quadrula fragosa

Scientific classification
- Domain: Eukaryota
- Kingdom: Animalia
- Phylum: Mollusca
- Class: Bivalvia
- Order: Unionida
- Family: Unionidae
- Tribe: Quadrulini
- Genus: Quadrula; Rafinesque, 1820

= Quadrula =

Genus of bivalves

Quadrula is a genus of freshwater mussels, aquatic bivalve mollusks in the family Unionidae native to rivers of the American Midwest and mid-south. All have thick nacreous shells with well-developed hinge teeth, many also with external shell sculpturing of nodules or lumps.

== Species within the genus Quadrula ==
In 2012, many species classified as Quadrula were moved to Rotundaria and Theliderma based on genetic and morphological evidence. Species currently in Quadrula now consist of:

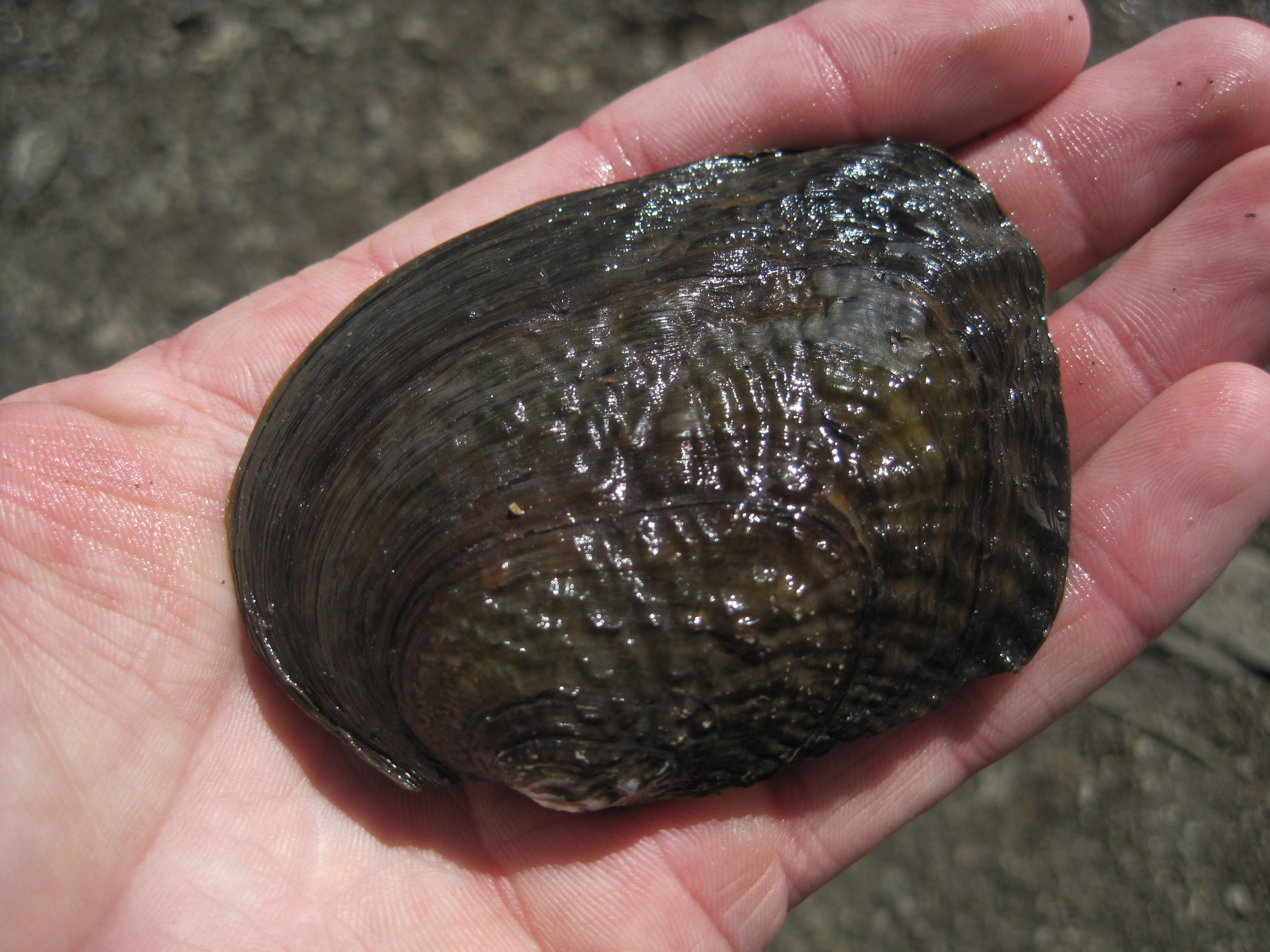
Quadrula verrucosa

- Quadrula apiculata (Southern mapleleaf)
- Quadrula fragosa (Winged mapleleaf)
- Quadrula nobilis (Gulf mapleleaf)
- Quadrula quadrula (Mapleleaf)
- Quadrula rumphiana (Ridged mapleleaf)
- Quadrula verrucosa (Pistolgrip)
