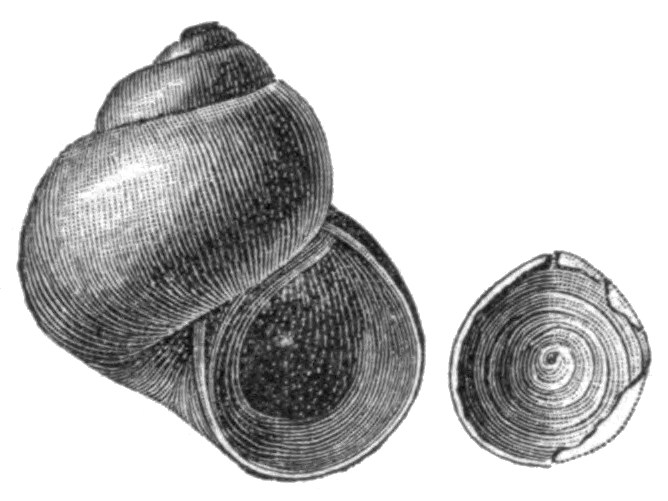
- Drawing of the shell of Amnicola dalli with an operculum.

Scientific classification
- Domain: Eukaryota
- Kingdom: Animalia
- Phylum: Mollusca
- Class: Gastropoda
- Subclass: Caenogastropoda
- Order: Littorinimorpha
- Family: Amnicolidae
- Subfamily: Amnicolinae
- Genus: Amnicola; Gould & Haldeman, 1840

Synonyms
- Amnicola (Amnicola) A. Gould & Haldeman, 1840 alternative representation; Amnicola (Euamnicola) Crosse & P. Fischer, 1891 junior subjective synonym; Euamnicola Crosse & P. Fischer, 1891 junior subjective synonym; Hydrobia (Amnicola) A. Gould & Haldeman, 1841

= Amnicola =

Genus of gastropods

Amnicola is a genus of very small freshwater snails which have an operculum. Amnicola species are aquatic prosobranch gastropod mollusks belonging to the family Amnicolidae according to the taxonomy of the Gastropoda (Bouchet & Rocroi, 2005).

Amnicola is the type genus of the family Amnicolidae.

== Description ==
Amnicola are a genus of tiny freshwater snails, typically less than half an inch (1.27 cm) long. These snails possess an operculum, a hard plate that seals their shell when they retract inside. Their shells are rounded and often as wide as they are tall, usually just a few millimeters in length. Notably, Amnicola snails can survive in warm water and low-oxygen conditions. Their shells generally exhibit a tan to light brown coloration.

Amnicola snails have high-spired shells ranging from 1/8th to 1/4 inch (4 millimeters) in height. These shells typically exhibit a brownish color with subtle shading and feature up to 8 convex whorls. The masked dusky snail relies on gills for respiration, making it dependent on dissolved oxygen in the water.

== Habitat ==
Populations are typically found in still waters environments, but can also be commonly collected in slow-moving rivers, often on woody debris.

== Food habits ==
Amnicola populations appear to be grazers of diatoms and other periphyton (Kesler 1981 and Cattaneo and Kalff 1986). They in turn they are preyed upon by crayfish (Lewis 2001) and sunfish (Lepomis) (Osenberg 1989 and Bronmark et al. 1992).

== Species ==
Species in the genus Amnicola include:

- † Amnicola adestus Dall, 1915
- † Amnicola bellatula H.-L. Gu, 1989
- † Amnicola bithynoides Yen, 1944
- Amnicola clarkei Pilsbry, 1917
- Amnicola cora Hubricht, 1979 - Foushee cavesnail
- † Amnicola crybetes A. B. Leonard, 1952
- Amnicola dalli (Pilsbry & Beecher, 1892) - peninsula amnicola
- †Amnicola datangensis W. Yü, 1977
- Amnicola decisus Haldeman, 1845
- † Amnicola expansilabris Aldrich, 1911
- † Amnicola gibbula X.-H. Yu, 1982
- † Amnicola globularis (Tournouër, 1880)
- † Amnicola inflata (Yen, 1950)
- † Amnicola jintanensis W. Yü, 1977
- † Amnicola jurassicus Yen, 1952
- † Amnicola kushuixiaensis H.-Z. Pan, 1982
- † Amnicola laiwuensis Yen, 1969
- † Amnicola lerodes Pilsbry, 1953
- Amnicola limosus (Say, 1817) - mud amnicola
- † Amnicola lufengensis H.-Z. Pan, 1977
- †Amnicola meikiensis W. Yü, 1980
- † Amnicola mimalongensis H.-Z. Pan, 1977
- † Amnicola minuta X.-H. Yu, 1982
- † Amnicola obsoleta H.-Z. Pan, 1977
- † Amnicola omphalotropis Pilsbry, 1892
- † Amnicola opima X.-H. Yu, 1982
- Amnicola pesmei Morlet, 1881 (status: uncertain > unassessed)
- Amnicola rhombostomus F. G. Thompson, 1968 - squaremouth amnicola
- Amnicola ricardi Pallary, 1922
- † Amnicola shuidonggouensis H.-Z. Pan, 1982
- † Amnicola stefanssoni Dall, 1924
- Amnicola stygius Hubricht, 1971 - stygian amnicola
- † Amnicola subrotunda X.-H. Yu, 1982 †
- † Amnicola truckeensis Yen, 1950
- † Amnicola xiagangensis W. Yü & X.-Q. Zhang, 1982
- † Amnicola xinyuensis W. Yü, 1977
- † Amnicola yangbiensis H.-Z. Pan, 1977
- † Amnicola yumenensis F. Guo, 1982
- † Amnicola yunlongensis H.-Z. Pan, 1977
- † Amnicola yunnanensis H.-Z. Pan, 1977
- † Amnicola zhejingensis H.-Z. Pan, 1980
- † Amnicola zhenjiangensis W. Yü, 1977
- † Amnicola zhuchengensis H.-Z. Pan, 1983
- † Amnicola zigongensis H.-Z. Pan, 1984

== Synonyms ==
- Amnicola aldrichi (Call & Beecher, 1886) - Hoosier amnicola: synonym of Fontigens aldrichi (Call & Beecher, 1886) (superseded combination)
- Amnicola attenuata Haldeman, 1842: synonym of Fontigens nickliniana (I. Lea, 1838) (junior synonym)
- Amnicola badia A. Gould, 1848: synonym of Potamopyrgus antipodarum (J. E. Gray, 1843) (junior subjective synonym)
- Amnicola bakeriana Pilsbry, 1917: synonym of Lyogyrus bakerianus (Pilsbry, 1917) (original combination)
- Amnicola browni Carpenter, 1872 - slender duskysnail: synonym of Lyogyrus brownii (H. F. Carpenter, 1872)
- Amnicola cisternina Walker, 1919: synonym of Aroapyrgus cisterninus (Walker, 1919)
- Amnicola comalensis Pilsbry & Ferriss, 1906: synonym of Marstonia comalensis (Pilsbry & Ferriss, 1906)
- Amnicola conchensensis Walker, 1919: synonym of Aroapyrgus conchensensis (Walker, 1919)
- Amnicola crosseana Pilsbry, 1910: synonym of Littoridina crosseana (Pilsbry, 1910)
- Amnicola egena A. Gould, 1848: synonym of Potamopyrgus antipodarum (J. E. Gray, 1843) (junior subjective synonym)
- Amnicola emarginata (Küster, 1852): synonym of Probythinella emarginata (Kuster, 1852)
- Amnicola emiliana Paladilhe, 1869: synonym of Mercuria emiliana (Paladilhe, 1869) (superseded combination)
- Amnicola floridana Frauenfeld, 1863: synonym of Floridobia floridana (Frauenfeld, 1863)
- Amnicola granum (Say, 1822) - squat duskysnail: synonym of Lyogyrus granum (Say, 1822)
- Amnicola greggi Pilsbry, 1935 - Rocky Mountain duskysnail: synonym of Colligyrus greggi (Pilsbry, 1935)
- Amnicola guatemalensis P. Fischer & Crosse, 1891: synonym of Aroapyrgus guatemalensis (P. Fischer & Crosse, 1891)
- Amnicola hindsi Baird, 1863: synonym of Fluminicola fuscus (Haldeman, 1841)
- Amnicola hinkleyi Walker, 1919: synonym of Aroapyrgus hinkleyi (Walker, 1919)
- Amnicola integra Say, 1821: synonym of Cincinnatia integra (Say, 1821)
- Amnicola lustrica Pilsbry, 1890: synonym of Marstonia lustrica (Pilsbry, 1890)
- Amnicola micrococcus Pilsbry, 1893: synonym of Pyrgulopsis micrococcus (Pilsbry, 1893)
- Amnicola missouriensis Pilsbry, 1898 - Missouri amnicola: synonym of Fontigens aldrichi (Call & Beecher, 1886)
- Amnicola orcutti Pilsbry, 1928: synonym of Littoridina orcutti (Pilsbry, 1928)
- Amnicola orizabensis (Crosse & P. Fischer, 1891): synonym of Aroapyrgus orizabensis (Crosse & P. Fischer, 1891)
- Amnicola pallida Haldeman, 1842: synonym of Amnicola limosus (Say, 1817)
- Amnicola panamensis Tryon, 1863: synonym of Aroapyrgus panamensis (Tryon, 1863)
- Amnicola panzosensis Walker, 1919: synonym of Aroapyrgus panzosensis (Walker, 1919)
- Amnicola pasionensis Goodrich & Van der Schalie, 1937: synonym of Aroapyrgus pasionensis (Goodrich & Van der Schalie, 1937)
- Amnicola pilsbry Walker, 1906 - lake duskysnail: synonym of Lyogyrus pilsbryi (B. Walker, 1906)
- Amnicola proserpina Hubricht, 1940 - Proserpine cavesnail: synonym of Fontigens proserpina (Hubricht, 1940)
- Amnicola pupoideus (Gould, 1841) - pupa duskysnail: synonym of Lyogyrus pupoideus (A. Gould, 1840)
- Amnicola retromargo F. G. Thompson, 1968 - indented duskysnail: synonym of Lyogyrus retromargo (F. G. Thompson, 1968)
- Amnicola rowelli Tryon, 1863: synonym of Cochliopa rowelli (Tryon, 1863)
- Amnicola sayana Haldeman, 1841: synonym of Pomatiopsis cincinnatiensis (I. Lea, 1840)
- Amnicola seminula Frauenfeld, 1863: synonym of Radomaniola seminula (Frauenfeld, 1863)
- Amnicola spirata Paladilhe, 1869: synonym of Pseudamnicola subproducta (Paladilhe, 1869)
- Amnicola stolli Martens, 1901: synonym of Aroapyrgus stolli (Martens, 1901)
- Amnicola subangulata Martens, 1899: synonym of Aroapyrgus subangulatus (Martens, 1899)
- Amnicola subproducta Paladilhe, 1869: synonym of Pseudamnicola subproducta (Paladilhe, 1869)
- Amnicola tenuipes Couper, 1844: synonym of Littoridinops tenuipes (Couper, 1844)
- Amnicola tryoni Pilsbry, 1904: synonym of Aroapyrgus tryoni (Pilsbry, 1904)
- Amnicola valvataeformis (Möllendorff, 1873): synonym of Islamia valvataeformis (Möllendorff, 1873)
- Amnicola walkeri Pilsbry, 1898 - Canadian duskysnail: synonym of Lyogyrus walkeri (Pilsbry, 1898)
- Amnicola winkleyi Pilsbry, 1912: synonym of Floridobia winkleyi (Pilsbry, 1912)
- Amnicola zelandiae J. E. Gray, 1843: synonym of Potamopyrgus antipodarum (J. E. Gray, 1843)
