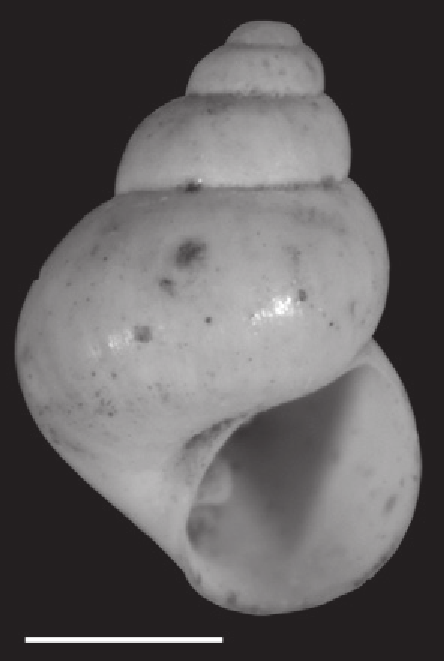
- Shell of one of the lectotypes of Marstonia comalensis. Scale bar is 1.0 mm.

Conservation status
- Critically Imperiled (NatureServe)

Scientific classification
- Kingdom: Animalia
- Phylum: Mollusca
- Class: Gastropoda
- Subclass: Caenogastropoda
- Order: Littorinimorpha
- Family: Hydrobiidae
- Genus: Marstonia
- Species: M. comalensis

Binomial name
- Marstonia comalensis (Pilsbry & Ferriss, 1906)

Synonyms
- Amnicola comalensis Pilsbry & Ferriss, 1906; Cincinnatia comalensis Taylor, 1975

= Marstonia comalensis =

Species of gastropod

Marstonia comalensis is a species of minute freshwater snail with a gill and an operculum, an aquatic gastropod mollusk or micromollusk in the family Hydrobiidae. It is found in south central Texas, United States.

Marstonia comalensis is large for this genus. It has an ovate-conic, openly umbilicate shell. The penis has a short filament and oblique, squarish lobe bearing a narrow gland along its distal edge. It is well differentiated morphologically from other congeners that have similar shells and penes, and is also genetically divergent relative to those congeners that have been sequenced (mtCOI divergence 3.0–8.5%).

This species has often been confused with Cincinnatia integra.

== Taxonomy ==
In 1906, Henry Augustus Pilsbry and James Ferriss described this species under the name Amnicola comalensis based on six shells from Comal Creek and the Guadalupe River near New Braunfels, south-central Texas. Pilsbry and Ferriss differentiated this species from Amnicola limosa (Say) and two nomina (Amnicola cincinnatiensis [Anthony], Amnicola peracuta Pilsbry & Walker) that are currently recognized as synonyms of Cincinnatia integra (Say) by its much smaller size and noted that it further differed from the latter by its less shouldered whorls. The genus Amnicola was used at that time as "a catch-all for most American amnicoloid species that could not conveniently be placed elsewhere on the basis of their shells". Amnicola comalensis was not further treated taxonomically until Taylor (1975) transferred it to Cincinnatia without comment in a bibliographic compilation; this allocation was widely followed in the subsequent literature. During the course of a revisionary study of Cincinnatia integra, Hershler and Thompson (1996) examined several alcohol preserved collections of a snail that they identified as Amnicola comalensis and noted that it closely resembled species of Marstonia (which were then placed in Pyrgulopsis); Amnicola comalensis was subsequently transferred to Marstonia based on this unpublished work. Hershler et al. (2003) published a molecular phylogenetic analysis of the North American nymphophilines that included a specimen of Marstonia comalensis from Old Faithful Spring in Real County, Texas (ca. 180 km from the type locality), which was depicted as nested within the Marstonia clade. This was the only published record for Marstonia comalensis subsequent to its original description. Hershler & Liu (2011) redescribed Marstonia comalensis based on study of a large series of dry shell and alcohol-preserved material, most of which was collected by malacologists J. J. Landye and D. W. Taylor from 1971–1993, and provided anatomical evidence supporting its current generic allocation.

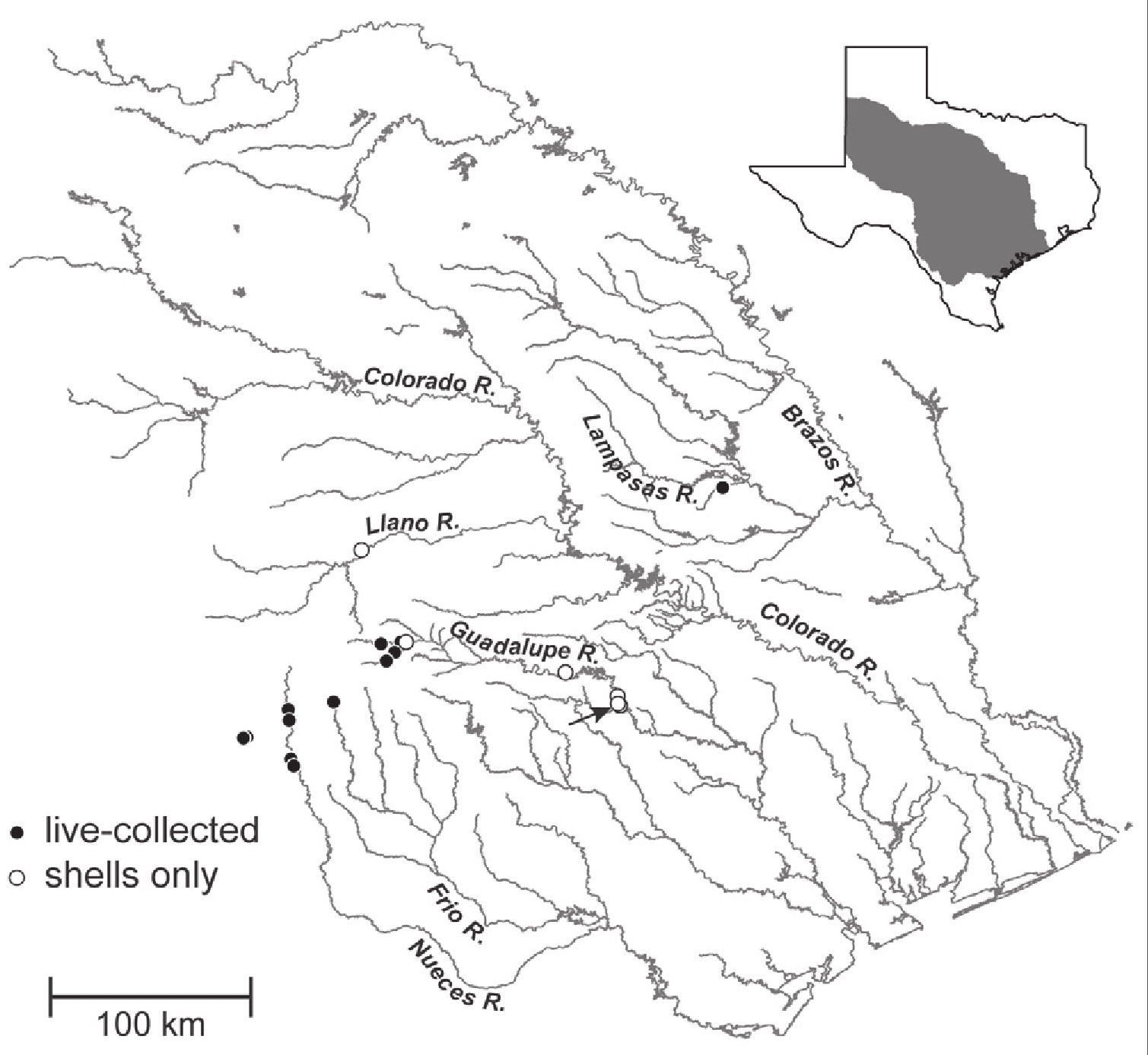
Map showing the distribution of Marstonia comalensis in the Brazos, Colorado, Guadalupe and Nueces River basins, south-central Texas. The arrow indicates the type locality (Comal Creek).

== Distribution ==
The type locality is Comal Creek, near New Braunfels, Comal County, Texas. The original collections of Marstonia comalensis are worn shells having the appearance of drift material. It is possible that Marstonia comalensis became extinct at Comal Springs when this water body temporarily dried in 1964; it is also possible that the shells of this species which have been found at this site were washed downflow from extant populations in the headwaters of the Guadalupe River.

Records published by Hershler & Liu (2011) considerably expanded the geographic range of Marstinia comalensis, which lives in springs and fluvial habitats spread among four river basins in south-central Texas. Almost all of these localities are on the Edwards Plateau. Records indicate that Marstonia comalensis was historically distributed in the upper portions of the Brazos River, Colorado River (Texas), Guadalupe River (Texas) and Nueces River basins, south-central Texas. The species has been live collected at only 12 localities and only two of these have been re-visited since 1993.

Hershler & Liu (2011) were unable to confirm a previous report by Cable & Isserhoff (1969) of this species from a drainage canal near Galveston Bay.

Hershler & Liu (2011) also analyzed previously published molecular data to evaluate the genetic divergence and phylogenetic relationships of Marstonia comalensis, whose geographic range is broadly disjunct relative to other members of the genus.

== Shell description ==
The shell is ovate-conic with 4.5–5.5 whorls. The height of the shell is about 2.6–4.6 mm. Protoconch is near planispiral, slightly tilted, initial 0.75–1.0 whorl strongly wrinkled. Teleoconch whorls are weakly convex, often narrowly shouldered, rarely having subsutural angulation. The sculpture of strong collabral growth lines, later whorls having numerous weak spiral striae. The aperture is pyriform or ovate. Inner lip complete across parietal wall in larger specimens, usually narrowly adnate, rarely slightly disjunct; usually thin, sometimes slightly thickened apically; columellar shelf absent or very narrow; outer lip thin or slightly thickened, orthocline or prosocline. Umbilicus is open but small.

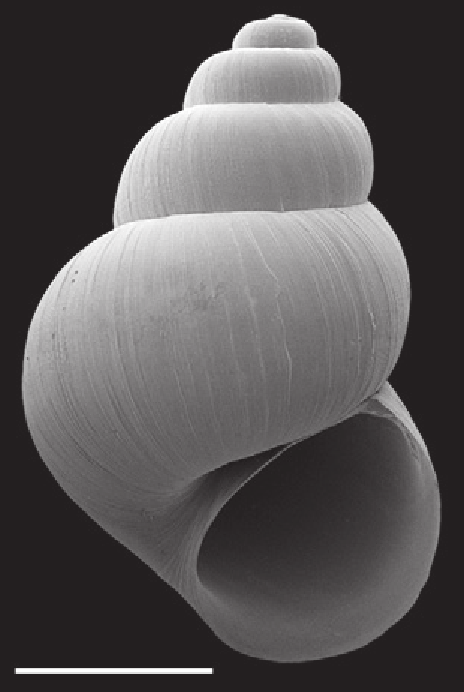
Photo of the shell. Scale bar: 1 mm.

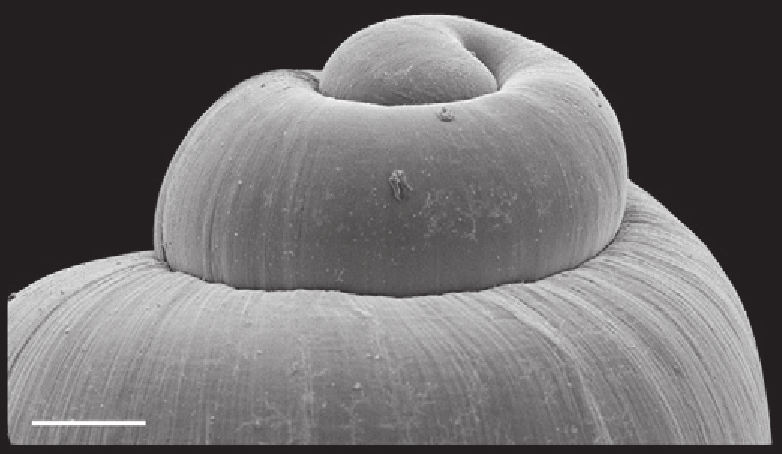
Photo of the lateral view of the apex. Scale bar: 100 μm.

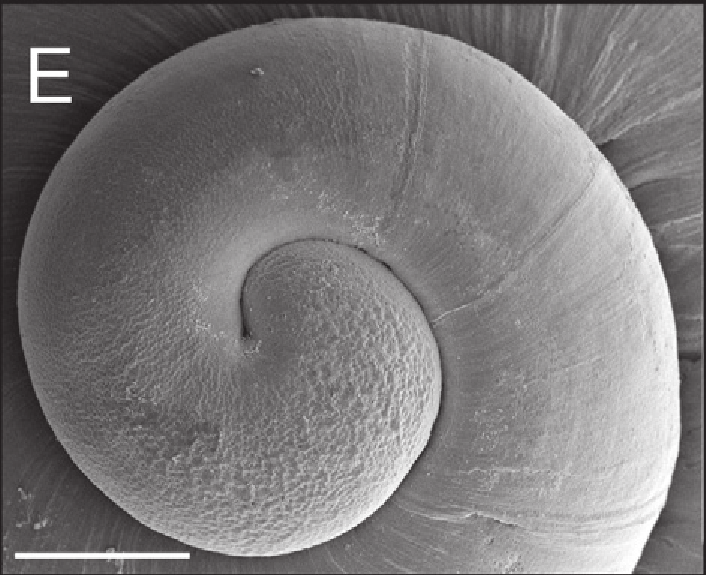
Photo of the protoconch. Scale bar: 100 μm.

The operculum is thin, amber, narrowly ovate, multispiral with eccentric nucleus. The last 0.25 whorl is sometimes frilled on outer side; inner side having well developed rim near outer edge. The attachment scar border is sometimes weakly thickened near the nucleus.

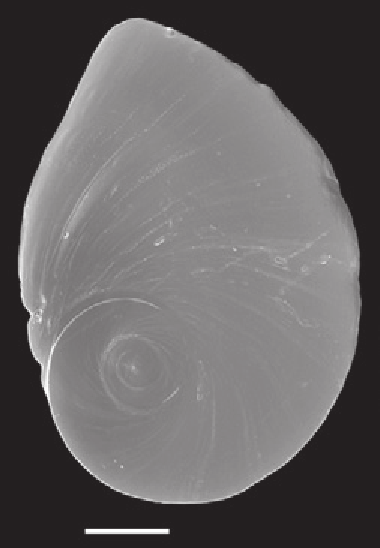
Photo of the outer side of the operculum. Scale bar: 200 μm.

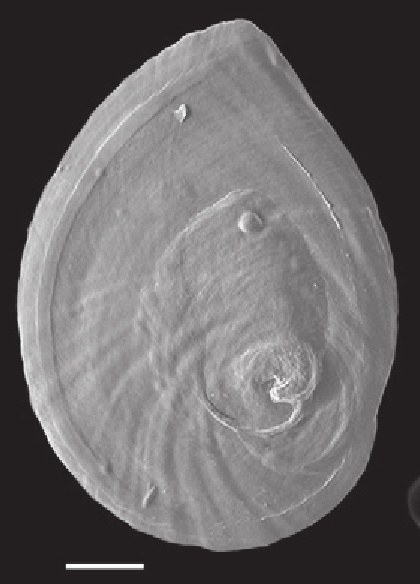
Photo of the inner side of the operculum. Scale bar: 200 μm.

== Anatomy ==
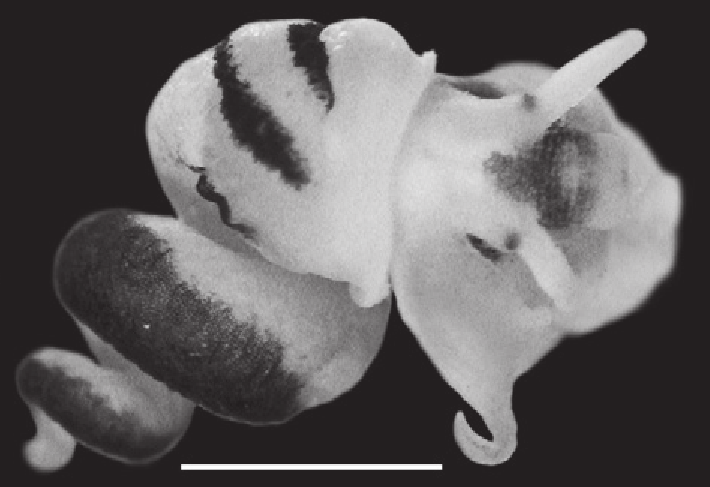
Dorsal view of Marstonia comalensis, relaxed, alcohol-preserved male, showing distinctive pigment bands on the pallial roof. Scale bar is 1.0 mm.

The cephalic tentacles are pale, except for black eyespots. Snout is brown, distal lips are pale and foot is pale. Pallial roof has black pigment bands along edges of ctenidium and dorsal edge of genital duct; visceral coil pale except for black pigment on testis. Ctenidium is positioned a little in front of pericardium. There are 24-25 ctenidial filaments, that are broadly triangular with lateral surfaces ridged. Osphradium is narrow, positioned slightly posterior to middle of ctenidium.

Radula has about 36 well-formed rows of teeth. Central teeth are about 38 μm wide with convex cutting edge. There are 3-8 lateral cusps. Central cusp are pointed or hoe-shaped, parallel-sided proximally or tapering throughout. There are 1-3 small basal cusps. Basal tongue is U- or V-shaped, about as long as lateral margins. Lateral tooth face is rectangular. Central cusp is pointed or hoe-shaped. There are 2-5 lateral cusps (inner) and 3-7 (outer). Outer wing is broad, flexed, with about 140% length of cutting edge. Basal tongue weakly is developed. Inner and outer marginal teeth both have 14-21 cusps and basally positioned rectangular wing.

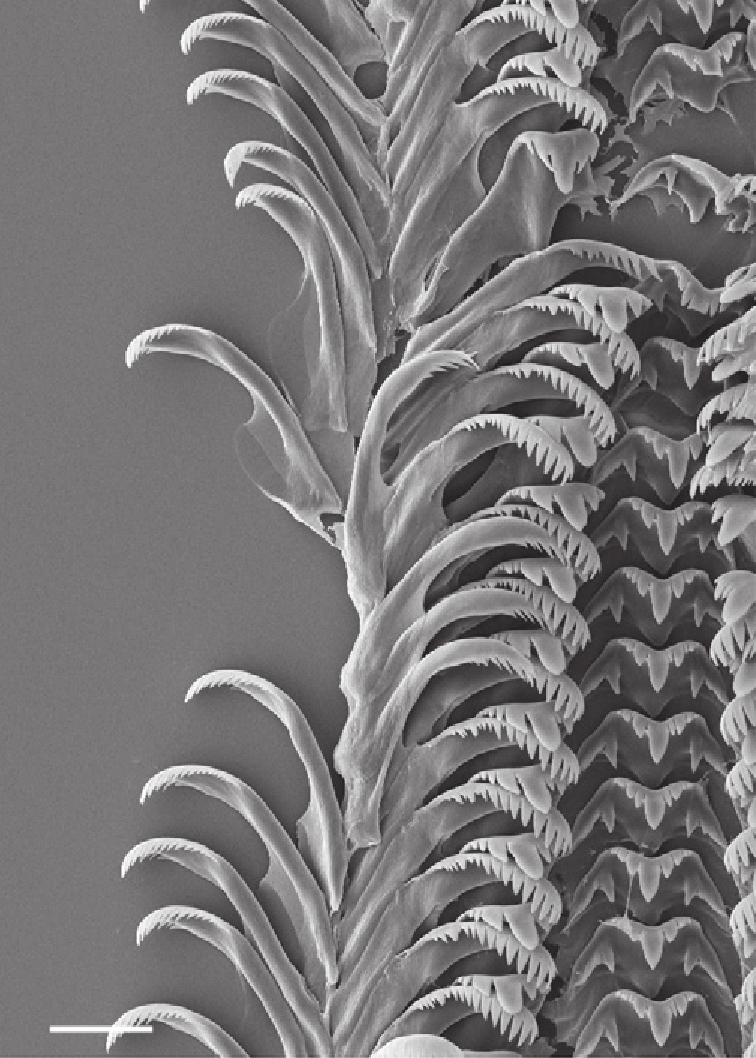
A Portion of radula of Marstonia comalensis showing outer marginal teeth (on the left), inner marginal teeth and immediately next to them lateral teeth, central teeth. Scale bar is 20 μm.

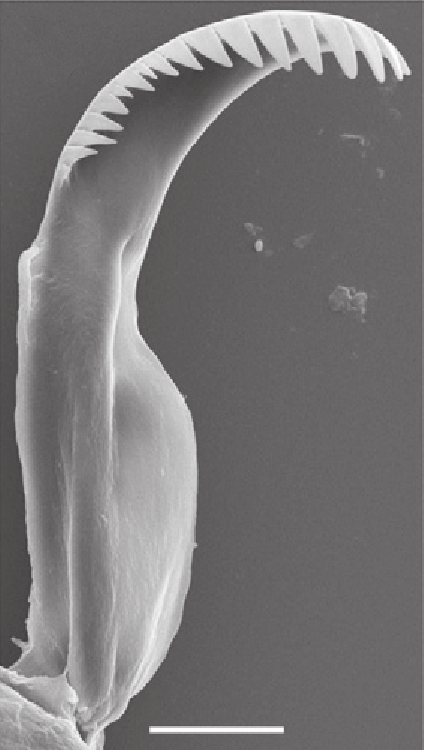
Inner marginal tooth. Scale bar is 10 μm.

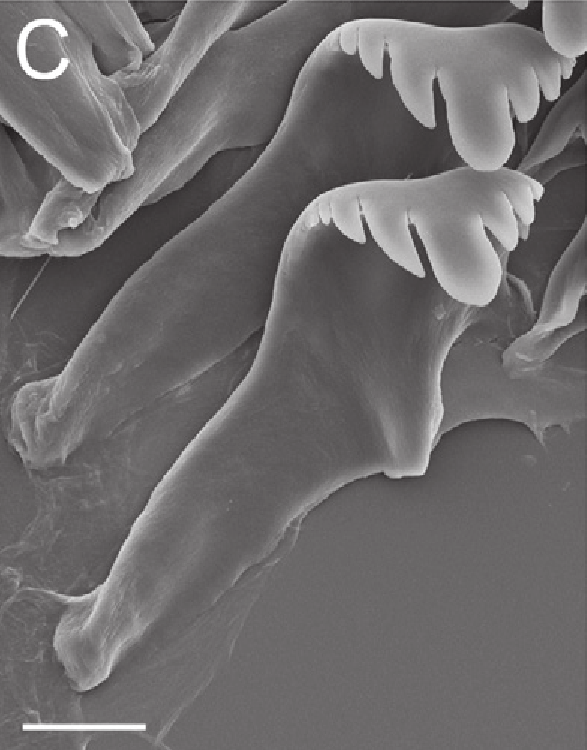
Lateral teeth. Scale bar is 10 μm.

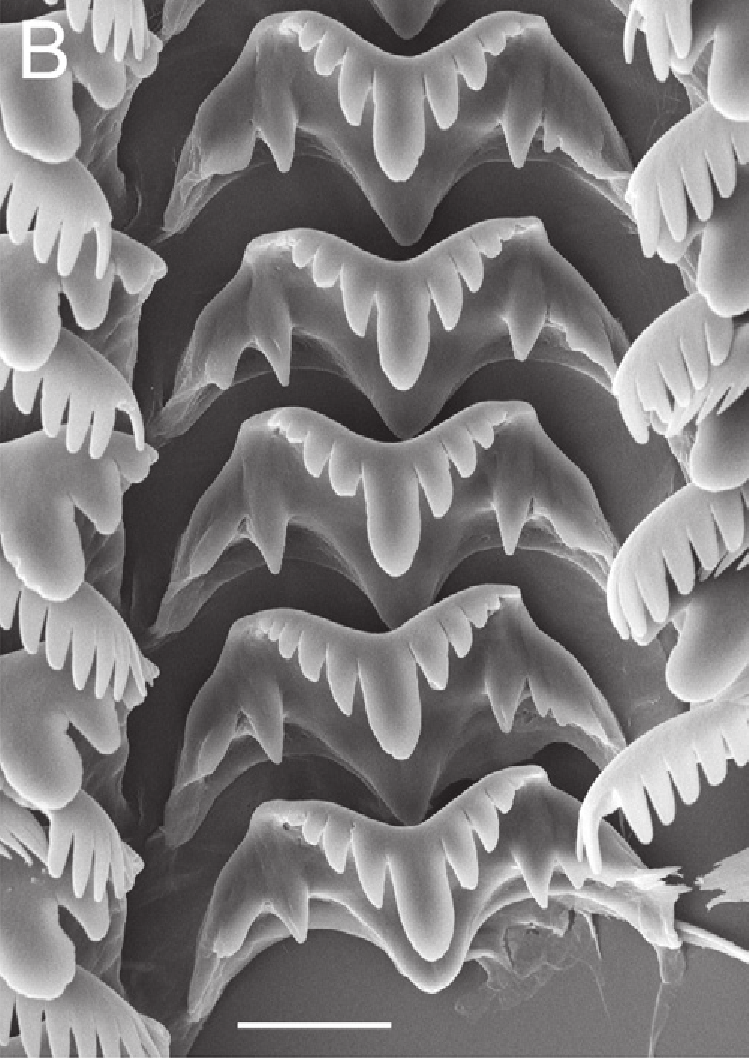
Central teeth. Scale bar is 10 μm.

Hypobranchial gland is large, overlapping rectum and part of genital duct, thickened alongside kidney. Style sac is longer than remaining portion of stomach, posterior stomach have small caecal appendix.

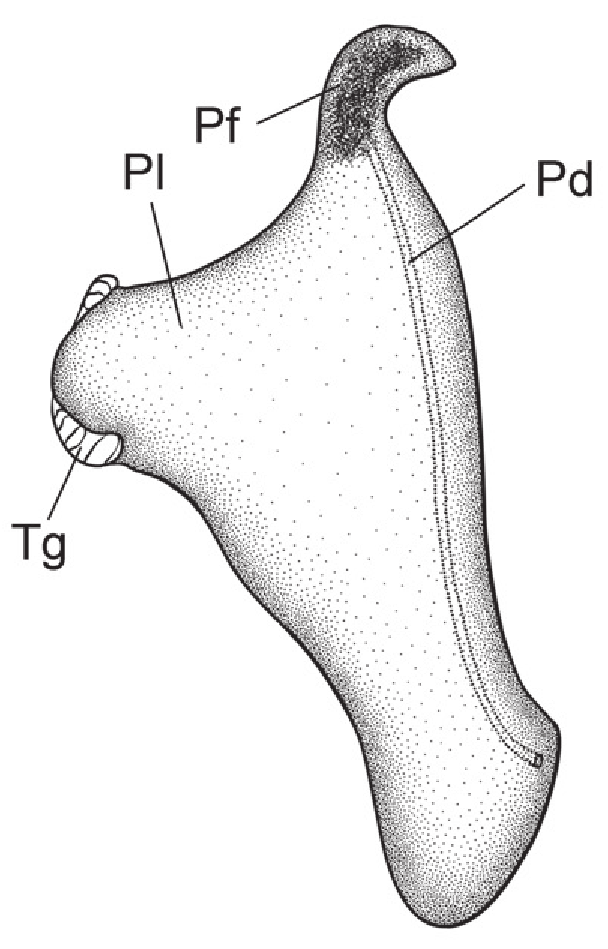
Drawing of the dorsal surface of penis of Marstonia comalensis. Tg = terminal gland, Pl = penial lobe, Pf = penial filament, Pd = penial duct.

Reproductive system: Testis is large (1.75 whorls), composed of compound lobes, broadly overlapping stomach anteriorly. Seminal vesicle is opening near anterior edge of testis, composed of a few thickened coils, positioned along ventral side of anterior 33% of testis. Prostate gland is small, pea-shaped, with about 50% of length in pallial roof. Anterior vas deferens opening from antero-ventral edge of prostate gland, section of duct on columellar muscle straight. Penis is large, base rectangular, inner edge without folds. Penial filament is short, narrow, tapering, oblique. Lobe is rather medium-sized, squarish, oblique. Terminal gland is narrow, usually transversely positioned along outer edge of lobe, less frequently horizontal, sometimes borne on short stalk. Penial duct is narrow, near outer edge, almost straight. Penial filament has black internal pigment core along most of length.

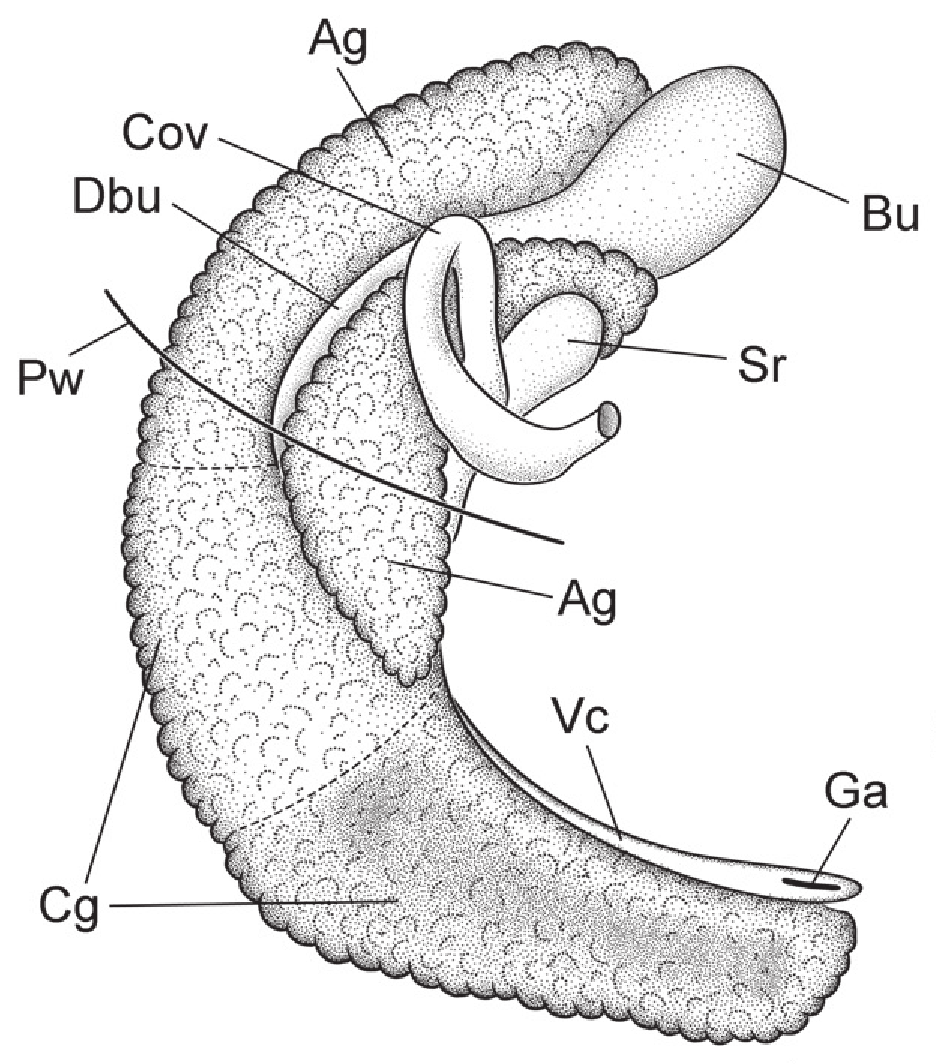
Drawing of female glandular oviduct and associated structures (viewed from left side) of Marstonia comalensis. Ag = albumen gland, Bu = bursa copulatrix, Cg = capsule gland, Cov = coiled oviduct, Dbu = bursal duct, Ga = genital aperture, Pw = posterior wall of pallial cavity, Sr = seminal receptacle, Vc = ventral channel of capsule gland.

Ovary is small (0.75 whorl), composed of simple, stalked lobes. It is slightly overlapping stomach anteriorly. Female glandular oviduct and associated structures are as follows: Coiled oviduct is narrow, vertical. Bursa copulatrix is small, ovate, horizontal, about 50% overlapped by albumen gland. Bursal duct is longer than bursa, narrow, opening from distal edge, partly embedded in albumen gland proximally, entirely embedded distally, junction with common duct well in front of posterior wall of pallial cavity. Seminal receptacle is small, pouch-like, positioned near ventral edge of albumen gland slightly anterior to bursa copulatrix. Albumen gland is largely visceral. Capsule gland composed of two distinct tissue sections. Genital aperture a terminal slit.

== Similar species ==
Marstonia comalensis has a closely similar shell and penis to some of its congeners, but can be differentiated from them in these ways:

It can be distinguished from Marstonia gaddisorum by its less convex shell whorls, distinctive pallial roof pigmentation, larger number of cusps on the inner side of the lateral teeth and on the outer marginal teeth, larger penial lobe, narrower terminal gland, and smaller overlap of the bursa copulatrix by the albumen gland.

If differs from Marstonia lustrica by its smaller prostate gland, smaller penial lobe, narrower penial filament, straight anterior vas deferens, partly imbedded (in albumen gland) bursal duct, and larger seminal receptacle.

It differs from Marstonia ogmorhaphe by its smaller size, broader shell, smaller prostate gland, straight anterior vas deferens, and smaller bursa copulatrix.

== Habitat ==
Marstonia comalensis lives in cold water springs near their sources, and slack water riverine habitats. It has been most commonly found on mud, aquatic vegetation and dead leaves.

== Conservation ==
This species was included in a recent federal listing petition (2007) based on its critically imperiled (G1) NatureServe (2009) ranking, but found not to warrant listing owing to insufficient information. The data by Hershler & Liu (2011) suggest that the conservation status of this snail needs to be re-assessed.
