= Lyogyrus =

Scientific classification
- Kingdom: Animalia
- Phylum: Mollusca
- Class: Gastropoda
- Subclass: Caenogastropoda
- Order: Littorinimorpha
- Family: Amnicolidae
- Genus: Lyogyrus; Gill, 1863

Synonyms
- Amnicola (Lyogyrus) Gill, 1863; Lyogyrus (Lyogyrus) Gill, 1863 alternative representation; Lyogyrus (Spirogyrus) F. G. Thompson & Hershler, 1991 alternative representation; Lyogyrus (Spyrogyrus) F. G. Thompson & Hershler, 1991 misspelling - incorrect subsequent spelling; Valvata (Lyogyrus) Gill, 1863 (unaccepted combination)

Genus of gastropods

Lyogyrus is a genus of very small freshwater snails with a gill and an operculum, aquatic gastropod mollusks in the family Amnicolidae.

== Species ==
Species within the genus Lyogyrus include:

- Lyogyrus bakerianus (Pilsbry, 1917)
- Lyogyrus brownii (H. F. Carpenter, 1872)
- Lyogyrus granum (Say, 1822)
- Lyogyrus latus F. G. Thompson & Hershler, 1991
- Lyogyrus pilsbryi (B. Walker, 1906)
- Lyogyrus pupoideus (A. Gould, 1840)
- Lyogyrus retromargo (F. G. Thompson, 1968)
- Lyogyrus walkeri (Pilsbry, 1898)

Synonyms

- † Lyogyrus beizhenensis Youluo, 1978 (unavailable name)
- Lyogyrus browni [sic]: synonym of Lyogyrus brownii (H. F. Carpenter, 1872) (incorrect spelling of original species name)
- † Lyogyrus cylindricus Youluo, 1978 (unavailable name)
- Lyogyrus dalli Pilsbry & Beecher, 1892: synonym of Amnicola dalli (Pilsbry & Beecher, 1892) (original combination)
- Lyogyrus greggi (Hershler, date unknown) - Rocky Mountain duskysnail: synonym of Colligyrus greggi (Pilsbry, 1935)
- Lyogyrus limosus (Say, 1817): synonym of Amnicola limosus (Say, 1817)
- Lyogyrus vanhyningi Vanatta, 1934: synonym of Floridobia vanhyningi (Vanatta, 1934) (original combination)
