= Amnicola stygius =

Conservation status
- Vulnerable (IUCN 3.1)

- Critically Imperiled (NatureServe)

Scientific classification
- Kingdom: Animalia
- Phylum: Mollusca
- Class: Gastropoda
- Subclass: Caenogastropoda
- Order: Littorinimorpha
- Family: Amnicolidae
- Genus: Amnicola
- Species: A. stygius

Binomial name
- Amnicola stygius Hubricht, 1971

Species of gastropod

Amnicola stygius is a species of very small aquatic snail, an operculate gastropod mollusk in the family Amnicolidae.

== Description ==
The length of the shell attains 2.4 mm, its diameter 2.7 mm.

== Distribution ==
The holotype was found in a stream in Tom Moore Cave, 3 miles north of Perryville, Perry County, Missouri, USA.
