= Marstoniopsis insubrica =

Conservation status
- Least Concern (IUCN 3.1)

Scientific classification
- Kingdom: Animalia
- Phylum: Mollusca
- Class: Gastropoda
- Subclass: Caenogastropoda
- Order: Littorinimorpha
- Family: Amnicolidae
- Genus: Marstoniopsis
- Species: M. insubrica

Binomial name
- Marstoniopsis insubrica (Küster, 1853)

Synonyms
- Paludina insubrica Küster, 1853; Marstoniopsis scholtzi (A. Schmidt, 1856)

Species of gastropod

Marstoniopsis insubrica is a species of small freshwater snail in the family Amnicolidae. It is widespread but patchily distributed in Europe. Although not considered endangered as a species, it is generally rare and locally threatened through much of its range; in Switzerland it is considered extinct.

== Distribution ==
The species lives in some areas in Northern, Western, Central, and Eastern Europe, including:

- Belgium
- Denmark
- Estonia
- Germany – critically endangered (vom Aussterben bedroht)
- Great Britain – rare
- Ireland
- Italy (northern)
- Latvia
- Lithuania
- Netherlands
- Poland
- Sweden
- Switzerland – extinct
- Ukraine – rare

== Habitat ==
Marstoniopsis insubrica occurs in lakes, rivers and estuaries.
