= Amnicola rhombostomus =

Conservation status
- Possibly Extinct (NatureServe)

Scientific classification
- Kingdom: Animalia
- Phylum: Mollusca
- Class: Gastropoda
- Subclass: Caenogastropoda
- Order: Littorinimorpha
- Family: Amnicolidae
- Genus: Amnicola
- Species: A. rhombostomus

Binomial name
- Amnicola rhombostomus F. G. Thompson, 1968

Synonyms
- Amnicola rhombostoma F. G. Thompson, 1968 (incorrect gender ending)

Species of gastropod

Amnicola rhombostomus, common name the squaremouth Amnicola snail, is a species of very small aquatic snail, an operculate gastropod mollusk in the family Amnicolidae.

== Distribution ==
This species occurs in Florida, USA.
