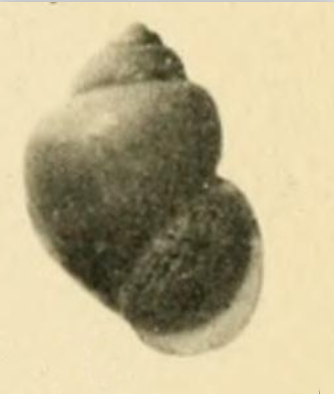
- Shell of Amnicola ricardi (holotype)

Scientific classification
- Kingdom: Animalia
- Phylum: Mollusca
- Class: Gastropoda
- Subclass: Caenogastropoda
- Order: Littorinimorpha
- Family: Amnicolidae
- Genus: Amnicola
- Species: A. ricardi

Binomial name
- Amnicola ricardi Pallary, 1922

= Amnicola ricardi =

Species of gastropod

Amnicola ricardi is a species of very small aquatic snail, an operculate gastropod mollusk in the family Amnicolidae.

== Description ==
The length of the shell attains 4 mm, its diameter 3 mm.

(Original description in French) The shell exhibits a globular shape and a brownish-red coloration. It possesses a well-developed spire, with the penultimate whorl notably large and laterally compressed. The aperture is remarkably high and oblong, displaying lateral compression. The upper part of the aperture is sharply angular, and the edges are notably thick.

== Distribution ==
This species was found at Mogador, Morocco.
