= Greenbrier cavesnail =

Conservation status
- Near Threatened (IUCN 3.1)

- Critically Imperiled (NatureServe)

Scientific classification
- Kingdom: Animalia
- Phylum: Mollusca
- Class: Gastropoda
- Subclass: Caenogastropoda
- Order: Littorinimorpha
- Family: Fontigentidae
- Genus: Fontigens
- Species: F. turritella

Binomial name
- Fontigens turritella Hubricht, 1976

Species of gastropod

The Greenbrier cavesnail (Fontigens turritella), is a species of very small or minute freshwater snail with an operculum, an aquatic gastropod mollusk in the family Hydrobiidae. This species is endemic to the United States.

The Greenbrier River Valley (which has many caves), is in West Virginia.
