= Amnicola clarkei =

Conservation status
- Critically Imperiled (NatureServe)

Scientific classification
- Kingdom: Animalia
- Phylum: Mollusca
- Class: Gastropoda
- Subclass: Caenogastropoda
- Order: Littorinimorpha
- Family: Amnicolidae
- Genus: Amnicola
- Species: A. clarkei

Binomial name
- Amnicola clarkei Pilsbry, 1917

Species of gastropod

Amnicola clarkei is a species of very small freshwater snail which has an operculum, an aquatic prosobranch gastropod mollusc in the family Amnicolidae.

== Description ==
The length of the shell attains 3.1 mm, its diameter 1.9 mm.

(Original description) The conical shell is narrowly umbilicate, with a slightly obtuse apex. It has a corneous, nearly smooth surface. The five whorls are highly convex, separated by a deep suture, and the body whorl is tubular. The aperture is distinctly oblique and almost circular, with the upper end rounded slightly more narrowly than the base. It projects only slightly beyond the preceding whorl laterally. The peristome is thin, continuous, and barely in contact with the preceding whorl above.

The operculum exhibits a relatively large spiral, with the nucleus located above the lower third.

== Distribution ==
This species occurs at the Oneida Lake, New York, USA.
