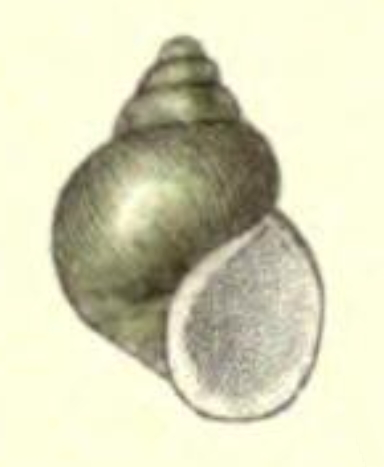
- Shell of Amnicola decisus (holotype)

Conservation status
- Critically Imperiled (NatureServe)

Scientific classification
- Kingdom: Animalia
- Phylum: Mollusca
- Class: Gastropoda
- Subclass: Caenogastropoda
- Order: Littorinimorpha
- Family: Amnicolidae
- Genus: Amnicola
- Species: A. decisus

Binomial name
- Amnicola decisus Haldeman, 1845

Synonyms
- Amnicola decisa Haldeman, 1845 (basionym)

= Amnicola decisus =

Species of gastropod

Amnicola decisus is a species of freshwater snail with an operculum, an aquatic gastropod mollusk belonging to the family Amnicolidae.

== Description ==
The size of the shell attains 4 mm.

(Original description) The animal is darkly pigmented with a blackish head, gradually lightening posteriorly. The tentacles are translucent with dark edges and show an orange-yellow spot at their internal base. The foot is yellowish, densely dotted with black anteriorly. The anterior edge of the foot is nearly as dark as the head. The foot base is densely dotted with orange centrally, with the dotting becoming sparser posteriorly and absent anteriorly.

The shell is relatively short and conical with a smooth, shining surface (when cleaned of adhering debris). Five not-very-convex whorls are present, separated by an impressed suture. The base is slightly perforate. The aperture is dilated and semicircular, with a slightly concave outer lip that contacts the shell posteriorly and nearly so along its entire length.

The color of the shell is pale green and slightly translucent when cleaned of adhering debris.

== Distribution ==
This species is primarily found in the Susquehanna River and the Schuylkill River in Pennsylvania, USA.
