= Tapered cavesnail =

Conservation status
- Data Deficient (IUCN 2.3)

Scientific classification
- Kingdom: Animalia
- Phylum: Mollusca
- Class: Gastropoda
- Subclass: Caenogastropoda
- Order: Littorinimorpha
- Family: Fontigentidae
- Genus: Fontigens
- Species: F. holsingeri

Binomial name
- Fontigens holsingeri Hubricht, 1976

Species of gastropod

The tapered cavesnail, scientific name Fontigens holsingeri, is a species of very small freshwater snail with a gill and an operculum, an aquatic gastropod mollusk in the family Hydrobiidae. This species is endemic to the United States.
