= Bliss Rapids snail =

Conservation status
- Vulnerable (IUCN 3.1)

- Critically Imperiled (NatureServe)
- Threatened (ESA)

Scientific classification
- Kingdom: Animalia
- Phylum: Mollusca
- Class: Gastropoda
- Subclass: Caenogastropoda
- Order: Littorinimorpha
- Family: Amnicolidae
- Genus: Taylorconcha
- Species: T. serpenticola

Binomial name
- Taylorconcha serpenticola Herschler, Frest, Johannes, Bowler & Thompson, 1994

Species of gastropod

The Bliss Rapids snail, scientific name Taylorconcha serpenticola, is a species of freshwater snail with a gill and an operculum, an aquatic gastropod mollusk in the family Lithoglyphidae.

This species is endemic to Idaho in the United States. Its natural habitat is rivers. It is threatened by habitat loss.

It is named after the Bliss Rapids on the Snake River as the river passes through the State of Idaho.
