= Lyogyrus bakerianus =

Conservation status
- Presumed Extinct (NatureServe)

Scientific classification
- Kingdom: Animalia
- Phylum: Mollusca
- Class: Gastropoda
- Subclass: Caenogastropoda
- Order: Littorinimorpha
- Family: Amnicolidae
- Genus: Lyogyrus
- Species: L. bakerianus

Binomial name
- Lyogyrus bakerianus (Pilsbry, 1917)

Synonyms
- Amnicola bakeriana Pilsbry, 1917

Species of gastropod

Lyogyrus bakerianus is a species of very small freshwater snail which has an operculum, an aquatic prosobranch gastropod mollusc in the family Amnicolidae.

== Description ==
The length of the shell attains 4.3 mm, its diameter 2.7 mm.

(Original description) The thin shell is umbilicate, turrito-conic and contains five whorls. It is whitish-corneous, exhibiting some translucency. It displays unevenly developed striations, prominent and closely spaced in some areas, while weaker and sparser in others. The summit is notably obtuse, resembling Amnicola limosus, with the initial whorl being nearly planorboid. Subsequent whorls are consistently and strongly convex. The aperture is very briefly ovate, almost round, with its length approximately 2.5 times shorter than the shell's length. The peristome is thin and separated from the preceding whorl for a short distance.

== Distribution ==
This species occurs at the Oneida Lake, New York, USA.
