= Amnicola cora =

Conservation status
- Vulnerable (IUCN 3.1)

- Critically Imperiled (NatureServe)

Scientific classification
- Kingdom: Animalia
- Phylum: Mollusca
- Class: Gastropoda
- Subclass: Caenogastropoda
- Order: Littorinimorpha
- Family: Amnicolidae
- Genus: Amnicola
- Species: A. cora

Binomial name
- Amnicola cora Hubricht, 1979

Species of gastropod

Amnicola cora is a species of very small freshwater snail which has an operculum, an aquatic prosobranch gastropod mollusc in the family Amnicolidae.

This species is endemic to Arkansas in the United States. Its natural habitat is a single cave in Independence County, Arkansas. It is threatened by habitat alteration.
