= Lyogyrus walkeri =

Canadian duskysnail

Conservation status
- Least Concern (IUCN 3.1)

- Apparently Secure (NatureServe)

Scientific classification
- Kingdom: Animalia
- Phylum: Mollusca
- Class: Gastropoda
- Subclass: Caenogastropoda
- Order: Littorinimorpha
- Family: Amnicolidae
- Genus: Lyogyrus
- Species: L. walkeri

Binomial name
- Lyogyrus walkeri (Pilsbry, 1898)

Synonyms
- Amnicola precursor Baker, 1928; Amnicola walkeri Pilsbry, 1898; Amnicola walkeri var. foxensis Baker, 1928

Species of gastropod

Lyogyrus walkeri, common name Canadian duskysnail, is a species of freshwater snail, an aquatic gastropod mollusk in the family Amnicolidae.

The name is in honor of Mr. Bryant Walker.

== Shell description ==
The shell is thin, narrowly umbilicate, conic, shaped like Lyogyrus brownii Carpenter. The color of the shell is slightly yellowish corneous. The shell is thin, smooth, with faint growth-lines. The shell has 4 whorls that are very convex and separated by deeply constricting sutures. The last whorl is rounded below. The apex is obtuse.

The aperture is oblique, rather small, mainly basal, a little longer than wide, but nearly circular. The inner margin is a trifle straightened above. The peristome is continuous, in contact with the preceding whorl for an extremely short distance above. Operculum is amnicoloid.

The width of the shell is 2-2.125 mm. The height of the shell is 2.33–3 mm. The width of aperture is 1-1.125 mm. The height of aperture is 1.08-1.25 mm.

== Anatomy ==
The radula is amnicoloid.

== Distribution ==
Type locality is Lake Michigan at High Island Harbor, Beaver Island, at 10 meters depth.

Other localities include: Reed's Lake, Grand Rapids, Michigan; River Rouge, Wayne County, Michigan.
