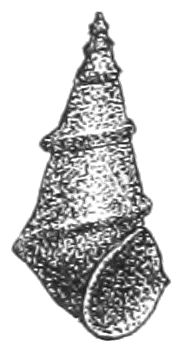
- Drawing of apertural view of the shell of Marstonia scalariformis.

Conservation status
- Critically Imperiled (NatureServe)

Scientific classification
- Kingdom: Animalia
- Phylum: Mollusca
- Class: Gastropoda
- Subclass: Caenogastropoda
- Order: Littorinimorpha
- Family: Hydrobiidae
- Subfamily: Nymphophilinae
- Genus: Marstonia
- Species: M. scalariformis

Binomial name
- Marstonia scalariformis (Wolf, 1869)

Synonyms
- Pyrgula scalariformis Wolf, 1869; Pyrgulopsis scalariformis (Wolf, 1869); Pyrgula scalariformis var. mississippiensis Pilsbry, 1886; Pyrgulopsis mississippiensis Pilsbry, 1886

= Marstonia scalariformis =

Species of gastropod

Marstonia scalariformis, previously known as Pyrgulopsis scalariformis, common name the moss pyrg, is a species of freshwater snail in the family Hydrobiidae.

== Shell description ==
The shell is 3.5–4.7 mm (0.14–0.19 in)high with 5.5–6 whorls. The shell is turreted, slender, and chalky white in color. The suture is deeply impressed. The shell is carinate in its entire length on the lower edge of the whorls.

The aperture is small, ovate, but slightly connected with the last whorl.

== Anatomy ==
The body of the animal is white.

== Distribution ==
Distribution of Marstonia scalariformis include Illinois, Alabama, Iowa, and Missouri, all within the Mississippi River System. Alive specimens are only known from Alabama and Missouri.

This species was abundant on its type locality on the Tazewell shore of the Illinois River in 1880s.

== Conservation ==
This species is critically imperiled.
