= Marstonia olivacea =

Conservation status
- Extinct (IUCN 3.1)

- Presumed Extinct (NatureServe)

Scientific classification
- Kingdom: Animalia
- Phylum: Mollusca
- Class: Gastropoda
- Subclass: Caenogastropoda
- Order: Littorinimorpha
- Family: Hydrobiidae
- Genus: Marstonia
- Species: †M. olivacea

Binomial name
- †Marstonia olivacea (Pilsbry, 1895)

Synonyms
- Pyrgulopsis olivacea (Pilsbry, 1895)

Species of gastropod

Marstonia olivacea, common name the olive marstonia, was a species of very small freshwater snail, an aquatic gastropod mollusc in the family Hydrobiidae. This species was endemic to Alabama, the United States. Its natural habitat was rivers. This species is now extinct.
