= Taylorconcha =

Scientific classification
- Kingdom: Animalia
- Phylum: Mollusca
- Class: Gastropoda
- Subclass: Caenogastropoda
- Order: Littorinimorpha
- Family: Amnicolidae
- Genus: Taylorconcha; Hershler, Frest, Johannes, Bowler & Thompson, 1994

Type species
- Taylorconcha serpenticola Hershler, Frest, Johannes, Bowler & Thompson, 1994

Species
- T. insperata Hershler, Liu, Frest, Johannes & Clark, 2006; T. serpenticola Hershler, Frest, Johannes, Bowler & Thompson, 1994

Genus of gastropods

Taylorconcha is a genus of small freshwater snails that have an operculum, aquatic gastropod mollusks in the family Amnicolidae.

== Species ==
This genus includes the following species:

- Taylorconcha insperata Hershler, Liu, Frest, Johannes & Clark, 2006
- Taylorconcha serpenticola Hershler, Frest, Johannes, Bowler & Thompson, 1994
