= Marstonia ozarkensis =

Conservation status
- Critically endangered, possibly extinct (IUCN 3.1)

- Critically Imperiled (NatureServe)

Scientific classification
- Kingdom: Animalia
- Phylum: Mollusca
- Class: Gastropoda
- Subclass: Caenogastropoda
- Order: Littorinimorpha
- Family: Hydrobiidae
- Genus: Marstonia
- Species: M. ozarkensis

Binomial name
- Marstonia ozarkensis (Hinkley, 1915)

Synonyms
- Pyrgulopsis ozarkensis Hinkley, 1915

Species of gastropod

Marstonia ozarkensis, common name the Ozark pyrg, is a species of very small or minute freshwater snails with an operculum, aquatic gastropod molluscs in the family Hydrobiidae. This species was endemic to Missouri and Arkansas in the United States and was presumed extinct by the U.S. Fish and Wildlife Service as of December 2018.

This species was named after the Ozarks, a highland region of the United States.
