= Harney Basin duskysnail =

Harney basin duskysnail

Conservation status
- Vulnerable (IUCN 2.3)

- Critically Imperiled (NatureServe)

Scientific classification
- Kingdom: Animalia
- Phylum: Mollusca
- Class: Gastropoda
- Subclass: Caenogastropoda
- Order: Littorinimorpha
- Family: Hydrobiidae
- Genus: Colligyrus
- Species: C. depressus

Binomial name
- Colligyrus depressus Herschler, 1999

Species of gastropod

The Harney Basin duskysnail, scientific name Colligyrus depressus, is a species of freshwater snail, an aquatic gastropod mollusk in the family Hydrobiidae.

This species is endemic to the Harney Basin area of southeastern Oregon in the United States.
