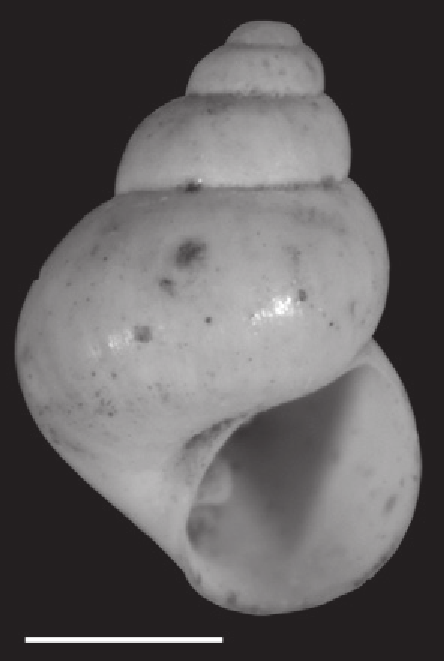
- shell of Marstonia comalensis
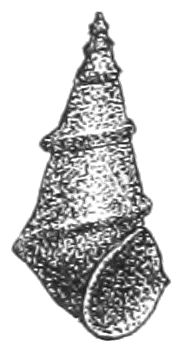
- Apertural view of a shell of Marstonia scalariformis.

Scientific classification
- Kingdom: Animalia
- Phylum: Mollusca
- Class: Gastropoda
- Subclass: Caenogastropoda
- Order: Littorinimorpha
- Family: Hydrobiidae
- Subfamily: Nymphophilinae
- Genus: Marstonia; Baker, 1926

Diversity
- 16 valid species

= Marstonia =

Genus of gastropods

Marstonia is a genus of freshwater snails with a gill and an operculum, aquatic gastropod molluscs in the family Hydrobiidae.

== Distribution ==
Species in the genus Marstonia are distributed in springs, streams and lakes in eastern North America. Most of these species have extremely narrow geographic ranges and consequently have become a focus of conservation activities; two are federally listed as endangered and others are variously listed by state wildlife agencies.

== Description ==
The freshwater gastropod genus Marstonia is composed of 15 small (shell height < 5.0 mm), ovate- to elongate-shelled species. Marstonia differs from the other eight North American nymphophiline genera in that the (female) oviduct and bursal duct join well in front of (instead of behind) the posterior wall of the pallial cavity. It has also been resolved as a well supported sub-clade within its subfamily based on mtDNA sequences.

== Species ==
Eastern North American species of Pyrgulopsis are considered to be in separate genus Marstonia according to Thompson & Hershler (2002).

- Marstonia agarhecta (F. G. Thompson, 1969) - synonym: Pyrgulopsis agarhecta F. G. Thompson, 1969 - Ocmulgee marstonia
- Marstonia arga - F. G. Thompson, 1977 - synonym: Pyrgulopsis arga (F. G. Thompson, 1977) - ghost marstonia
- Marstonia castor F. G. Thompson, 1977 - synonym: Pyrgulopsis castor (F. G. Thompson, 1977) - beaverpond marstonia
- Marstonia halcyon F. G. Thompson, 1977 - synonym: Pyrgulopsis halcyon (F. G. Thompson, 1977) - halcyon marstonia
- Marstonia hershleri (F. G. Thompson, 1995) - synonym: Pyrgulopsis hershleri F. G. Thompson, 1995 - Coosa pyrg
- Marstonia letsoni (Walker, 1901) - synonym: Pyrgulopsis letsoni (Walker, 1901) - gravel pyrg
- Marstonia lustrica (Pilsbry, 1890) - synonym: Pyrgulopsis lustrica (Pilsbry, 1890) - boreal marstonia
- Marstonia ogmorhaphe (F. G. Thompson, 1977) - synonym: Pyrgulopsis ogmoraphe (F. G. Thompson, 1977) - royal springsnail
- Marstonia olivacea (Pilsbry, 1895) - synonym: Pyrgulopsis olivacea (Pilsbry, 1895) - olive marstonia, it may be extinct
- Marstonia ozarkensis (Hinkley, 1915) - synonym: Pyrgulopsis ozarkensis Hinkley, 1915 - Ozark pyrg, it may be extinct
- Marstonia pachyta F. G. Thompson, 1977 - synonym: Pyrgulopsis pachyta (F. G. Thompson, 1977) - armored marstonia
- Marstonia scalariformis (Wolf, 1869) - synonym: Pyrgulopsis scalariformis (Wolf, 1869) - moss pyrg

Other species of Marstonia include:

- Marstonia angulobasis F. G. Thompson, 2005 - angled marstonia
- Marstonia comalensis (Pilsbry & Ferriss, 1906) - Comal siltsnail
- Marstonia gaddisorum F. G. Thompson, 2004 - Gaddis marstonia
- †Marstonia inflata H.-J. Wang, 1977

Although Marstonia has been reviewed four times since 1978 (Thompson 1978, Hershler 1994, Thompson & Hershler 2002, Hershler & Liu 2011), three of its congeners have been little studied beyond their original descriptions and their anatomy is unknown. Two of these — Marstonia olivacea, Marstonia ozarkensis — may be extinct and thus will likely remain incertae sedis.
