= Marstoniopsis =

Scientific classification
- Kingdom: Animalia
- Phylum: Mollusca
- Class: Gastropoda
- Subclass: Caenogastropoda
- Order: Littorinimorpha
- Family: Amnicolidae
- Subfamily: Amnicolinae
- Genus: Marstoniopsis; Van Regteren Altena, 1936

Synonyms
- Parabythinella Radoman, 1973

Genus of gastropods

Marstoniopsis is a genus of minute freshwater snails with a gill and an operculum, aquatic gastropod mollusks or micromollusks in the family Amnicolidae.

== Species ==
Species within the genus Marstoniopsis include:

- Marstoniopsis armoricana (Paladilhe, 1869)
- Marstoniopsis croatica Schütt, 1974
- Marstoniopsis graeca (Radoman, 1978)
- Marstoniopsis insubrica (Küster, 1853) - synonym: Marstoniopsis scholtzi (Schmidt, 1856)
- Marstoniopsis vrbasi Bole & Velkovrh, 1987
