= Akiyoshia =

Scientific classification
- Kingdom: Animalia
- Phylum: Mollusca
- Class: Gastropoda
- Subclass: Caenogastropoda
- Order: Littorinimorpha
- Family: Amnicolidae
- Subfamily: Amnicolinae
- Genus: Akiyoshia; Kuroda & Habe, 1954

Genus of gastropods

Akiyoshia is a genus of freshwater snails with a gill and an operculum, aquatic gastropod mollusks in the family Amnicolidae.

== Distribution ==
The distribution of Akiyoshia includes Japan from whence it was described.

There are some indications that so-called "Akiyoshia" species from southern China may not be true Akiyoshia.

== Description ==
Species in the subgenus Saganoa from Japan are blind snails. "Akiyoshia" species from China are not blind.

== Species ==
Species within the genus Akiyoshia include:

Subgenus Akiyoshia

- Akiyoshia uenoi Kuroda & Habe, 1954 - the type species, was described from Japan

Subgenus Saganoa Kuroda, Habe & Tamu, 1957

- "Akiyoshia" chinensis Liu, Zhang & Chen, 1982 - anatomy of this Chinese species was described in 1992,
- Akiyoshia kishiiana Kuroda, Habe & Tamu, 1957
- Akiyoshia morimotoi
- "Akiyoshia" yunnanensis Liu, Wang & Zhang, 1982

Nomina nuda:

- Akiyoshia odonta, Akiyoshia (Saganoa) odonta Feng et al., 1985 and Akiyoshia (Saganoa) odonta Feng et al., 1986 are nomina nuda.

== Ecology ==
The habitat for species in the Saganoa subgenus from Japan is caves and wells.

"Akiyoshia" species from China live in streams.
