= Fontigens aldrichi =

Conservation status
- Apparently Secure (NatureServe)

Scientific classification
- Kingdom: Animalia
- Phylum: Mollusca
- Class: Gastropoda
- Subclass: Caenogastropoda
- Order: Littorinimorpha
- Family: Fontigentidae
- Genus: Fontigens
- Species: F. aldrichi

Binomial name
- Fontigens aldrichi (Call & Beecher, 1886)

Synonyms
- Bythinella aldrichi Call & Beecher, 1886; Amnicola aldrichi (Call & Beecher, 1886); Amnicola aldrichi aldrichi (Call & Beecher, 1886); Amnicola aldrichi insolita Hubricht, 1940; Amnicola missouriensis Pilsbry, 1898

Species of gastropod

Fontigens aldrichi, common name the Missouri amnicola, is a species of freshwater snail, an aquatic gastropod mollusk in the family Fontigentidae.

== Shell description ==
The shell is minute, imperforate, obliquely ovate, light brown. The surface of the shell is smooth except for slight growth-lines. The shell is composed of 3½ very convex whorls separated by unusually deep sutures. The apex is obtuse and often eroded. The last whorl is shortly deflexed in front in adult specimens.

The aperture is rotund-ovate, being slightly narrowed above, but not angular there. The aperture is not modified in form by the preceding whorl. The aperture is moderately oblique. The peristome is continuous, not closely appressed at the upper left side. The columellar margin is thick and calloused within.

The width of the shell is 1.3 mm. The height of the shell is 1.7 mm. The height of aperture is 0.8 mm.

== Distribution ==
Type locality is Carter County, Missouri.
