= Lyogyrus granum =

Conservation status
- Least Concern (IUCN 3.1)

- Secure (NatureServe)

Scientific classification
- Kingdom: Animalia
- Phylum: Mollusca
- Class: Gastropoda
- Subclass: Caenogastropoda
- Order: Littorinimorpha
- Family: Amnicolidae
- Genus: Lyogyrus
- Species: L. granum

Binomial name
- Lyogyrus granum (Say, 1822)

Synonyms
- Paludina grana Say, 1822; Lyogyrus (Lyogyrus) granum (Say, 1822)

Species of gastropod

Lyogyrus granum, common name the squat duskysnail, is a species of very small or minute freshwater snail with a gill and an operculum, an aquatic gastropod mollusk in the family Amnicolidae.

== Distribution and conservation status ==
This species of snail lives in New Brunswick and in Nova Scotia in Canada. It was categorized as data deficient (DD) by the Committee on the Status of Endangered Wildlife in Canada (COSEWIC).
