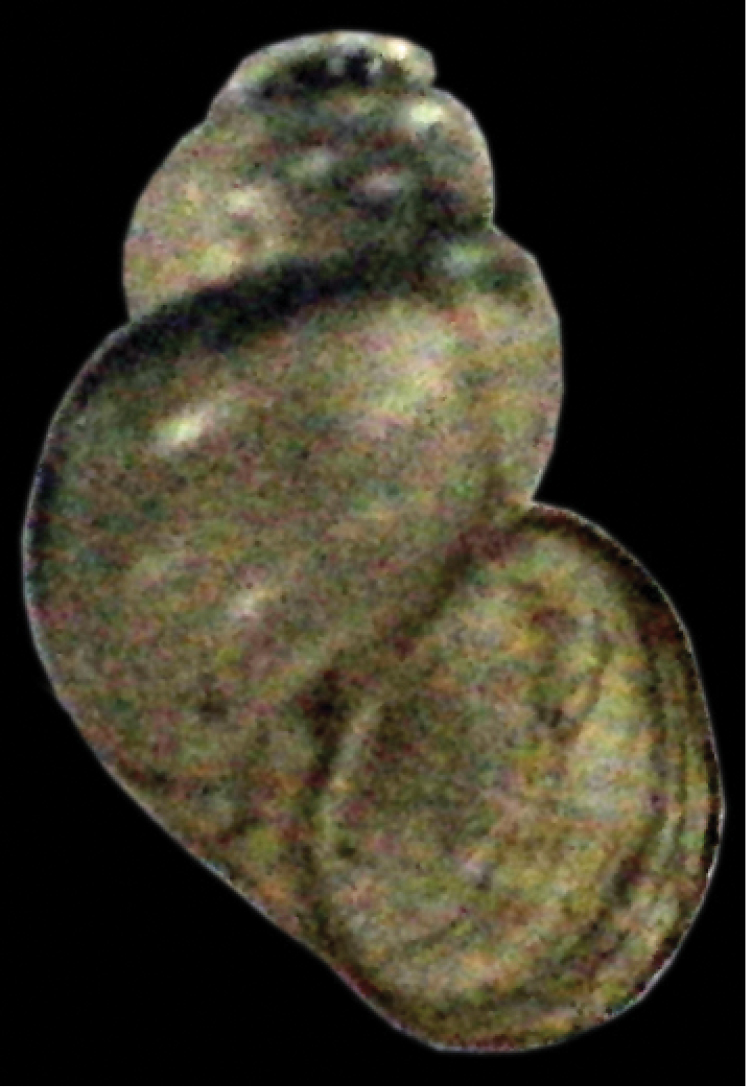
- Erhaia

Scientific classification
- Kingdom: Animalia
- Phylum: Mollusca
- Class: Gastropoda
- Subclass: Caenogastropoda
- Order: Littorinimorpha
- Family: Amnicolidae
- Subfamily: Amnicolinae
- Genus: Erhaia; Davis & Kuo in Davis, Kuo, Hoagland, Chen, Yang & Chen, 1985

= Erhaia =

Genus of gastropods

Erhaia is a genus of small to minute freshwater snails with a gill and an operculum, aquatic gastropod mollusks in the family Amnicolidae.

Erhaia is the type genus of the tribe Erhaiini, which is now a synonym of the subfamily Amnicolinae.

Erhaia (also within the tribe Erhaiini) was originally described as a genus within the Pomatiopsidae in 1985, but Wilke et al. (2000, 2001) moved it to the Amnicolidae.

== Distribution ==
The distribution of Erhaia includes southern China and India. The center of biodiversity of Erhaia in China is located in the provinces of Hunan, Hubei and Sichuan. Distribution also includes Fujian Province. There is also scattered occurrences of Erhaia in Yunnan Province. These snails live in the Yangtze River drainage and in the Mekong River drainage (1 species).

== Description ==
The length of the shell of this species is up to 3.9 mm.

== Species ==
Species within the genus Erhaia include:

- Erhaia daliensis Davis & Kuo, 1985
- Erhaia gongjianguoi (Kang, 1983)
- Erhaia hubiensis (Liu, Zhang & Wang, 1983)
- Erhaia jianouensis (Liu & Zhang, 1979)
- Erhaia kunmingensis Davis & Kuo, 1985
- Erhaia lii (Kang)
- Erhaia nainitalensis Davis & Rao, 1997
- Erhaia robusta (Kang, 1986)
- Erhaia sheminensis
- Erhaia wangchuki Gittenberger, Sherub & Stelbrink, 2017
- Erhaia wantanensis
- Erhaia wufengensis

Synonyms:

- Erhaia chinensis Davis et al. 1985 and Erhaia chinensis Davis & Kang, 1995 are synonyms of Chencuia chinensis Liu & Zhang, 1979

== Ecology ==
Erhaia lives in streams in mountainous areas.
