= Fontigens =

Scientific classification
- Kingdom: Animalia
- Phylum: Mollusca
- Class: Gastropoda
- Subclass: Caenogastropoda
- Order: Littorinimorpha
- Family: Fontigentidae
- Genus: Fontigens; Pilsbry, 1933

Type species
- Paludina nickliniana I. Lea, 1838

Genus of gastropods

Fontigens is a genus of minute freshwater snails with an operculum, aquatic gastropod molluscs or micromolluscs in the family Fontigentidae.

== Species ==
Species within the genus Fontigens include:

- Fontigens aldrichi (Call & Beecher, 1886)
- Fontigens antroecetes (Hubricht, 1940)
- Fontigens binneyana Hannibal, 1912
- Fontigens bottimeri (B.Walker, 1925)
- Fontigens cryptica Hubricht, 1963
- Fontigens davisi Dillon, Malabad, Orndorff & H-P. Liu, 2023
- Fontigens hershleri Dillon, Malabad, Orndorff & H-P. Liu, 2023
- Fontigens morrisoni Hershler, Holsinger & Hubricht, 1990
- Fontigens nickliniana (I.Lea, 1838)
- Fontigens orolibas Hubricht, 1957
- † Fontigens palaea Pilsbry, 1953
- Fontigens proserpina (Hubricht, 1940)
- † Fontigens symmetrica Pilsbry, 1953
- Fontigens tartarea Hubricht, 1963
- Fontigens turritella Hubricht, 1976 - Greenbrier cavesnail

Synonyms

- Fontigens holsingeri Hubricht, 1976 - Tapered cavesnail: synonym of Fontigens tartarea Hubricht, 1963 (junior subjective synonym)
- Fontigens oxybeles Pilsbry, 1950: synonym of Tryonia aequicostata (Pilsbry, 1890) (junior subjective synonym)
- Fontigens weberi Pilsbry, 1950: synonym of Tryonia aequicostata (Pilsbry, 1890) (junior subjective synonym)
