= Colligyrus =

Scientific classification
- Kingdom: Animalia
- Phylum: Mollusca
- Class: Gastropoda
- Subclass: Caenogastropoda
- Order: Littorinimorpha
- Family: Hydrobiidae
- Genus: Colligyrus; Hershler, 1999

Genus of gastropods

Colligyrus is a genus of small freshwater snails that have an operculum, aquatic gastropod mollusks in the family Hydrobiidae.

== Species ==
Species within the genus Colligyrus include:

- Colligyrus convexus Hershler, Frest, Liu, and Johannes, 2003
- Colligyrus depressus Herschler, 1999 - Harney Basin duskysnail
- Colligyrus greggi (Pilsbry, 1935) - type species
