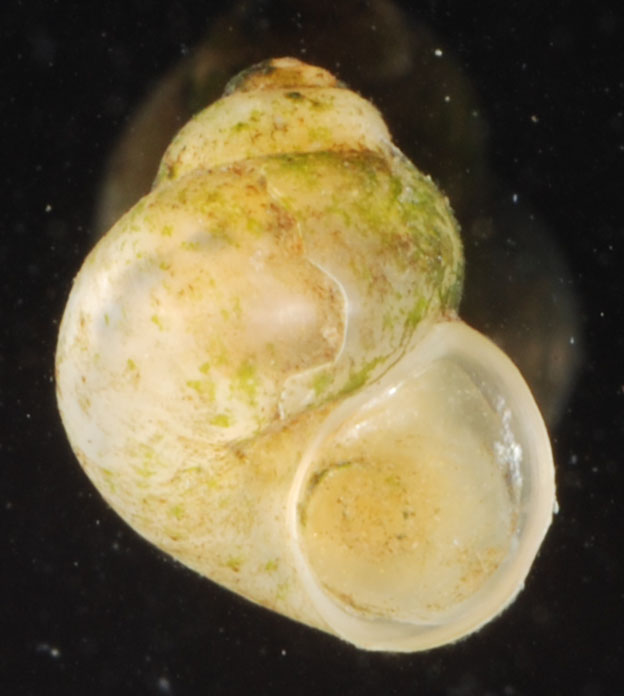

Conservation status
- Least Concern (IUCN 3.1)

- Secure (NatureServe)

Scientific classification
- Kingdom: Animalia
- Phylum: Mollusca
- Class: Gastropoda
- Subclass: Caenogastropoda
- Order: Littorinimorpha
- Family: Amnicolidae
- Genus: Amnicola
- Species: A. limosus

Binomial name
- Amnicola limosus (Say, 1817)

Synonyms
- Amnicola ferruginea Calkins, 1880 ·; Amnicola limosa Say, 1817; Amnicola limosa var. superiorensis F. C. Baker, 1928; Amnicola orbiculata I. Lea, 1841; Amnicola pallida Haldeman, 1842 ·; Amnicola parva I. Lea, 1841; Amnicola schrokingeri Frauenfeld, 1863; Japonia (Cytora) studeri (Suter, 1896) junior subjective synonym·; Lagochilus studeri Suter, 1896; Lyogyrus limosus (Say, 1817) ·; Paludina limosa Say, 1817; Paludina porata Say, 1821

= Amnicola limosus =

Species of gastropod

Amnicola limosus, common name the mud amnicola, is a species of very small aquatic snail, an operculate gastropod mollusk in the family Amnicolidae.

== Distribution ==
This species occurs in the Northwest Atlantic Ocean and along the Gulf of Maine. Amnicola limosus limosus has been found in Utah.

The type locality is Delaware River and Schuylkill River.

== Description ==
(Described as Amnicola pallida) The shell is very pale ochraceous and umbilicated, approximately the size of Marstonia lustrica (Pilsbry, 1890). The aperture is oval, with the outer lip tightly appressed to the body whorl, making the junction nearly indistinguishable.

== Parasites ==
Amnicola limosus is the first intermediate host for the trematode Metorchis conjunctus.
