= Marstonia ogmorhaphe =

Conservation status
- Least Concern (IUCN 3.1)

- Endangered (ESA)

Scientific classification
- Kingdom: Animalia
- Phylum: Mollusca
- Class: Gastropoda
- Subclass: Caenogastropoda
- Order: Littorinimorpha
- Family: Hydrobiidae
- Subfamily: Nymphophilinae
- Genus: Marstonia
- Species: M. ogmorhaphe

Binomial name
- Marstonia ogmorhaphe (F. G. Thompson, 1977)

Synonyms
- Pyrgulopsis ogmorhaphe (F. G. Thompson, 1977)

Species of gastropod

Marstonia ogmorhaphe, common names the royal marstonia or royal springsnail, is a minute species of freshwater snail, an aquatic gastropod mollusk or micromollusk in the family Hydrobiidae, the mud snails. This species is endemic to Tennessee in the United States, where it occurs in two streams in Marion County. It is a federally listed endangered species of the United States.

This snail was first described in 1977. It is under 5 millimeters long. It lives in the diatomaceous ooze and debris in springs. It is limited to the Sequatchie River Valley, where it lives in Blue Spring, the water supply for the town of Jasper, Tennessee, and the stream just past the spring. It also lives in Owen Spring, four miles away.

This species is threatened by the degradation of water quality in its habitat, which is caused by coal mining and other processes.
