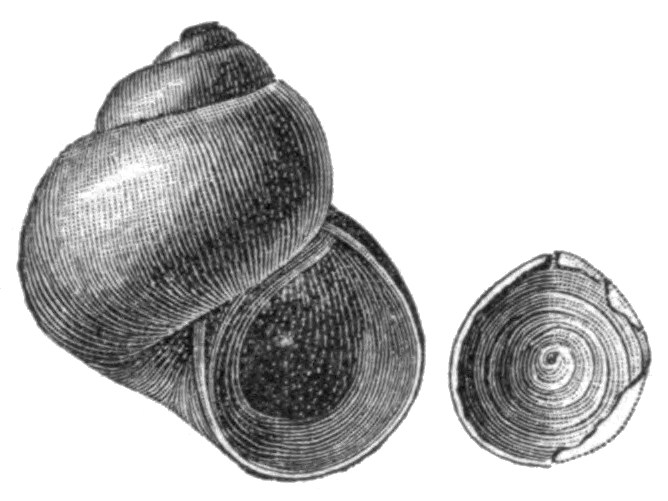
- Drawing of an apertural view of the shell and operculum of Amnicola dalli

Conservation status
- Secure (NatureServe)

Scientific classification
- Kingdom: Animalia
- Phylum: Mollusca
- Class: Gastropoda
- Subclass: Caenogastropoda
- Order: Littorinimorpha
- Family: Amnicolidae
- Genus: Amnicola
- Species: A. dalli

Binomial name
- Amnicola dalli (Pilsbry & Beecher, 1892)

Synonyms
- Amnicola johnsoni Pilsbry, 1899 (junior synonym); Lyogyrus dalli Pilsbry & Beecher, 1892 (original combination)

= Amnicola dalli =

Peninsula amnicola

Species of gastropod

Amnicola dalli, common name the peninsula amnicola, is a species of freshwater snail with an operculum, an aquatic gastropod mollusk in the family Amnicolidae.

The specific epithet is in honor of W. H. Dall.

== Subspecies ==
- Amnicola dalli johnsoni (Pilsbry, 1899) North Peninsula Amnicola - image

== Shell description ==
The shell is narrowly umbilicate, obtusely conical, and lustrous with a smooth surface and a light brown or greenish-horn coloration. It exhibits 4 convex whorls that gradually increase in size, separated by a regularly impressed, moderately deep suture.

The aperture is rounded anteriorly and somewhat angular posteriorly, with a bluish-white interior. The outer lip is simple, sharp, and connected by a thickened callus. The columella is moderately reflexed.

The width of the shell is 2.30 mm. The height of the shell is 3.50 mm.

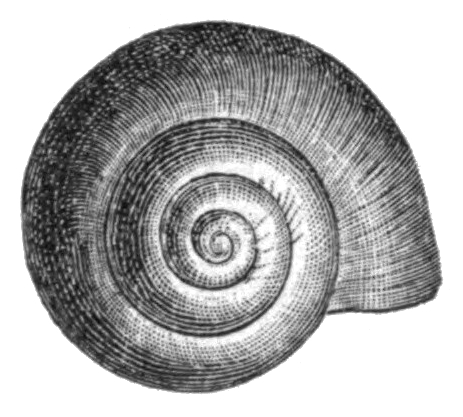
Drawing of the apical view of the shell.

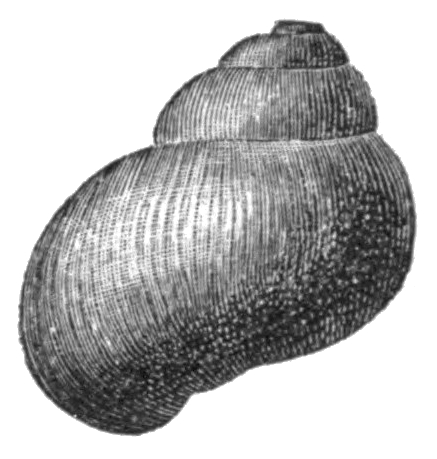
Drawing of the lateral view of the shell.

== Anatomy ==
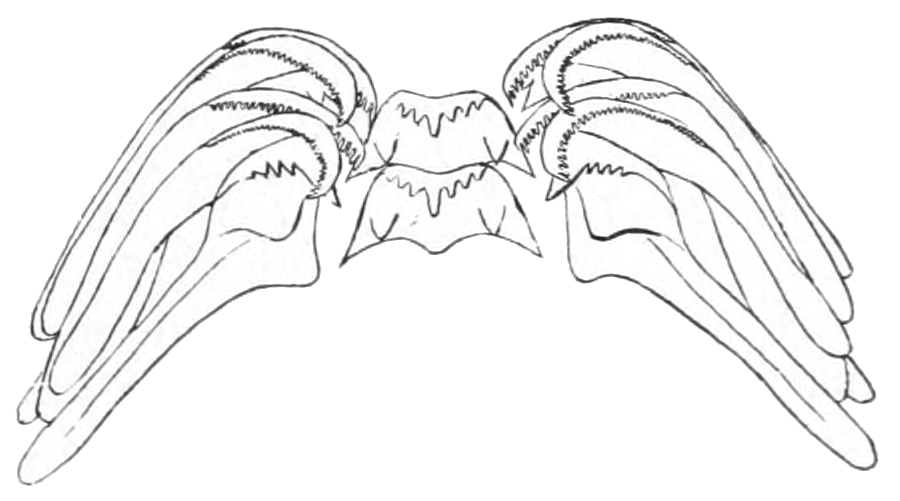
Drawing of the radula of Amnicola dalli.

The jaw is thin and membranaceous.

The formula off the radula is: 34-23-7- (3+1+3)/(1+1) -7-23-34.

== Distribution ==
The type locality is mountain streams which are tributary to Pyramid Lake in northwestern Nevada.
