= Fontigentidae =

Scientific classification
- Kingdom: Animalia
- Phylum: Mollusca
- Class: Gastropoda
- Subclass: Caenogastropoda
- Order: Littorinimorpha
- Superfamily: Truncatelloidea
- Family: Fontigentidae; D. W. Taylor, 1966

Synonyms
- Fontigentinae D. W. Taylor, 1966 superseded rank

Family of gastropods

Fontigentidae is a family of small freshwater snails with a gill and an operculum, aquatic gastropod mollusks in the superfamily Truncatelloidea.

== Genera ==
- Fontigens Pilsbry, 1933

Synonyms

- Stimpsonia Clessin, 1878: synonym of Fontigens Pilsbry, 1933 (invalid: junior homonym of Stimpsonia Girard, 1853; Fontigens is a replacement name)
