= Marstonia lustrica =

Conservation status
- Least Concern (IUCN 3.1)

- Apparently Secure (NatureServe)

Scientific classification
- Kingdom: Animalia
- Phylum: Mollusca
- Class: Gastropoda
- Subclass: Caenogastropoda
- Order: Littorinimorpha
- Family: Hydrobiidae
- Genus: Marstonia
- Species: M. lustrica

Binomial name
- Marstonia lustrica (Pilsbry, 1890)

Synonyms
- Amnicola greenensis Baker, 1928; Amnicola lustrica Pilsbry, 1890; Amnicola lustrica var. decepta Baker, 1928; Amnicola lustrica var. gelida Baker, 1921; Amnicola lustrica var. perlustrica Baker, 1928; Amnicola oneida Pilsbry, 1917; Amnicola winkleyi var. leightoni Baker, 1920; Marstonia decepta (Baker, 1928)

Species of gastropod

Marstonia lustrica is a species of very small freshwater snail which has an operculum, an aquatic prosobranch gastropod mollusc in the family Hydrobiidae.

== Description ==
The length of the shell attains 4 mm, its diameter 2 mm.

(Original description as Amnicola oneida) The shell is typically more slender than Marstonia lustrica. It is turrito-conic, narrowly umbilicate, and corneous with minute striations. The shell contains six whorls. The apex is slightly obtuse, but the first whorl projects noticeably, similar to Marstonia lustrica. The whorls are highly convex, separated by a deep suture. The aperture is ovate and small, with its length exceeding three times the shell's length. The upper extremity of the aperture is narrowly rounded. The peristome is continuous, thin, and contacts the preceding whorl very briefly above.

== Distribution ==
This species occurs at the Oneida Lake, New York, USA.
