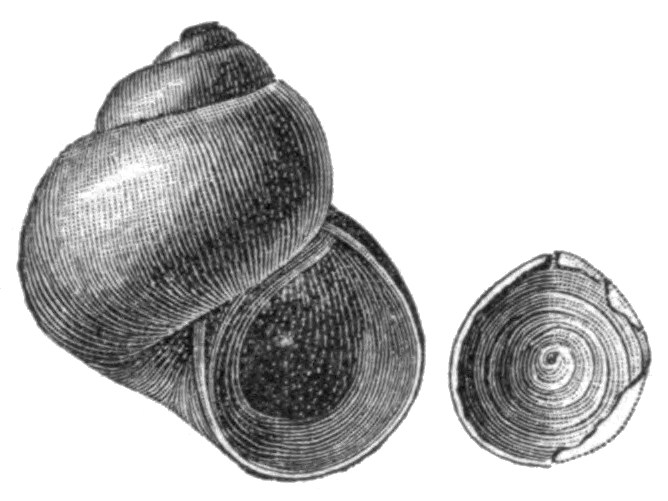
- Drawing of the shell of Amnicola dalli with the operculum next to it

Scientific classification
- Kingdom: Animalia
- Phylum: Mollusca
- Class: Gastropoda
- Subclass: Caenogastropoda
- Order: Littorinimorpha
- Superfamily: Truncatelloidea
- Family: Amnicolidae; Tryon, 1863

Diversity
- About 200 freshwater species

Synonyms
- Amnicolinae Tryon, 1863 superseded rank; Erhaiini G. M. Davis & Y.-H. Kuo, 1985; Kolhymamnicolidae Starobogatov, 1983; Lyogyrinae Pilsbry, 1916; Parabythinellinae Radoman, 1976; Pseudobythinellini G. M. Davis & C.-E. Chen, 1992

= Amnicolidae =

Family of gastropods

Amnicolidae is a family of small freshwater snails with a gill and an operculum, aquatic gastropod mollusks in the superfamily Rissooidea.

This family is in the clade Littorinimorpha (according to the taxonomy of the Gastropoda by Bouchet & Rocroi, 2005). This family was previously considered to be a subfamily of Hydrobiidae.

== Subfamilies ==
The family Amnicolidae consists of 3 subfamilies (according to the taxonomy of the Gastropoda by Bouchet & Rocroi, 2005):

- Subfamily Amnicolinae Tryon, 1863, synonymised with:
  - Tribe Erhaiini Davis & Kuo, 1985
  - Subfamily Lyogyrinae Pilsbry, 1916
  - Subfamily Parabythinellinae Radoman, 1976
  - Tribe Pseudobythinellini Davis & Chen, 1992
- Subfamily Baicaliinae P. Fisher, 1885, synonymised with:
  - Subfamily Liobaicaliinae B. Dybowski & Grochmalicki, 1913
  - Subfamily Turribaicaliinae B. Dybowski & Grochmalicki, 1917

== Genera ==
- Akiyoshia Kuroda & Habe, 1954,: belongs to family Erhaiidae G. M. Davis & Y.-H. Kuo, 1985
- Amnicola Gould & Haldeman, 1840
- Chencuia Davis, 1997: belongs to the family Erhaiidae G. M. Davis & Y.-H. Kuo, 1985
- Colligyrus Hershler, 1999
- Dasyscias F. G. Thompson & Hershler, 1991
- Erhaia Davis & Kuo, 1985,: belongs to the family Erhaiidae G. M. Davis & Y.-H. Kuo, 1985
- † Kangxianospira F. Guo, 1982
- Kolhymamnicola Starobogatov & Budnikova, 1976
- † Luofuspira W. Yü, 1977
- Lyogyrus Gill, 1863
- Marstoniopsis van Regteren Altena, 1936
- † Mesopyrgium Yen & Reeside, 1946
- Moria Kuroda & Habe, 1958
- † Pachychiloides Wenz, 1939 †
- Parabythinella Radoman, 1973
- † Protamnicola Yen, 1946 †
- † Pycnanema H.-Z. Pan, 1980
- Rachipteron F.G. Thompson, 1964
- † Reesidella Yen, 1953
- † Sagia Yen, 1952
- † Stantonogyra Yen, 1946
- † Subtilistriata H.-Z. Pan, 1980
- Taylorconcha Hershler, Frest, Johannes, Bowler & F. G. Thompson, 1994
- † Triasamnicola Yen & Reeside, 1946
- † Trochispira Yen, 1954
- † Yongkangia W. Yü, 1980
