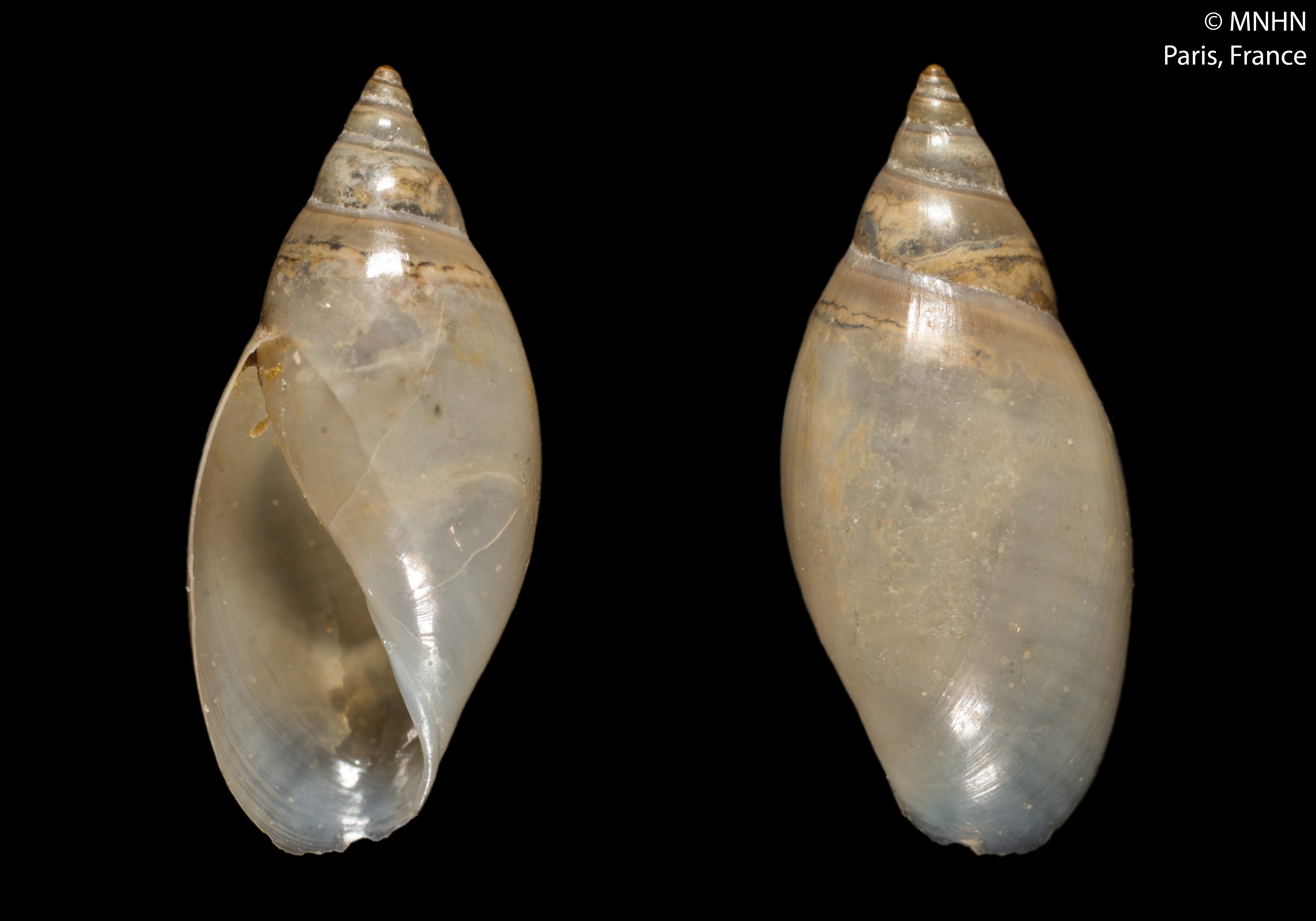
- Shell of Mayabina spiculata (syntype at MNHN, Paris)

Scientific classification
- Kingdom: Animalia
- Phylum: Mollusca
- Class: Gastropoda
- Superorder: Hygrophila
- Superfamily: Lymnaeoidea
- Family: Physidae
- Genus: Mayabina; D. W. Taylor, 2003

Type species
- Physa spiculata Morelet, 1849

= Mayabina =

Genus of gastropods

Mayabina is a genus of small, left-handed or sinistral, air-breathing freshwater snails, aquatic pulmonate gastropod mollusks in the subfamily Aplexinae of the family Physidae.

== Species ==
- Mayabina bullula (Crosse & P. Fischer, 1882)
- Mayabina carolita (Jousseaume, 1887)
- Mayabina nitidula (Clessin, 1886)
- Mayabina obtusa (Clessin, 1885)
- Mayabina petenensis D. W. Taylor, 2003
- Mayabina pliculosa (E. von Martens, 1898)
- Mayabina polita D. W. Taylor, 2003
- Mayabina sanctijohannis D. W. Taylor, 2003
- Mayabina spiculata (Morelet, 1849)
- Mayabina tapanensis (Crosse & P. Fischer, 1882)
- Mayabina tempisquensis D. W. Taylor, 2003
