= Stenophysa =

Scientific classification
- Kingdom: Animalia
- Phylum: Mollusca
- Class: Gastropoda
- Superorder: Hygrophila
- Superfamily: Lymnaeoidea
- Family: Physidae
- Subfamily: Physinae
- Genus: Stenophysa; Martens, 1898

Synonyms
- Aplexa (Stenophysa) E. von Martens, 1898 (unaccepted combination)

Genus of molluscs

Stenophysa is a genus of gastropods belonging to the family Physidae.

The species of this genus are found in America and Africa.

Species:

- Stenophysa marmorata (Guilding, 1828), synonym Aplexa marmorata
- Stenophysa maugeriae (J.E.Gray, 1837)
- Stenophysa meigsii (Dall, 1890)
- Stenophysa simoni (Jousseaume, 1889) (taxon inquirendum)
- Stenophysa spathidophallus Taylor, 2003

Synonyms

- Stenophysa venezuelensis (Martens, 1859): synonym of Aplexa venezuelensis (E. von Martens, 1859)
