= Sibirenauta sibirica =

Scientific classification
- Kingdom: Animalia
- Phylum: Mollusca
- Class: Gastropoda
- Superorder: Hygrophila
- Family: Physidae
- Genus: Sibirenauta
- Species: S. sibirica

Binomial name
- Sibirenauta sibirica (Westerlund, 1877)

Synonyms
- Physa (? Isidora) sibirica Westerlund, 1877; Physa sibirica Westerlund, 1877; Sibirenauta sibirica (Westerlund, 1877)

Species of gastropod

Sibirenauta sibirica is a species of small air-breathing freshwater snail, an aquatic pulmonate gastropod mollusk in the family Physidae, a family which are sometimes known as the bladder snails.

== Taxonomy ==
Swedish malacologist Carl Agardh Westerlund discovered and described this species under the name Physa sibirica in 1877. Starobogatov et al. moved this species to the genus Sibirenauta in 1989. Vinarski and colleagues designated the lectotype for Sibirenauta sibirica in 2013 and the lectotype is stored in the Swedish Museum of Natural History in Stockholm. The generic name Sibirenauta is feminine (according to original description), the correct species name should be Sibirenauta sibirica instead of S. sibiricus as it was cited by several authors.

== Distribution ==
Distribution of Sibirenauta sibirica include northern Asia and Alaska. It occurs in Arctic Asia, Subarctic Asia and in the south of Eastern Siberia.

This species occurs in:

- Wrangel Island, Russia. No mollusc species were found on Wrangel Island up to 2015.

The type locality is Yenisei River, Sopotchnaya Korga, 71°40’N in Taymyr Peninsula.

== Description ==
The external and internal morphology is described and depicted for example by Vinarski et al. 2015.

The height of the shell is up to 13 millimetres (0.51 in), usually 10–12 mm (0.39–0.47 in) The shell has 6 whorls.

Dimensions of the lectotype are as follows: The width of the shell is 4.7 millimetres (0.19 in). The height of the shell is 8.8 millimetres (0.35 in). The shell has 4.75 whorls.

== Ecology ==
For example, there was pH 8.2 and 84 ppm NaCl on the lake locality in the Wrangel Island.
