= Acroloxus macedonicus =

Conservation status
- Critically Endangered (IUCN 3.1)

Scientific classification
- Kingdom: Animalia
- Phylum: Mollusca
- Class: Gastropoda
- Superorder: Hygrophila
- Family: Acroloxidae
- Genus: Acroloxus
- Species: A. macedonicus

Binomial name
- Acroloxus macedonicus Hadžišče, 1959

Species of gastropod

Acroloxus macedonicus is a critically endangered species of very small freshwater snail in the family Acroloxidae.

== Distribution ==
This species occurs in Albania.
