= Sibirenauta elongata =

Conservation status
- Secure (NatureServe)

Scientific classification
- Kingdom: Animalia
- Phylum: Mollusca
- Class: Gastropoda
- Superorder: Hygrophila
- Family: Physidae
- Genus: Sibirenauta
- Species: S. elongata

Binomial name
- Sibirenauta elongata (Say, 1821)

Synonyms
- Aplexa elongata (Say, 1821)

Species of gastropod

Sibirenauta elongata is a species of gastropods belonging to the family Physidae.

The species is found in Northern America.
