= Rocky Mountain capshell =

Conservation status
- Near Threatened (IUCN 3.1)

- Vulnerable (NatureServe)

Scientific classification
- Kingdom: Animalia
- Phylum: Mollusca
- Class: Gastropoda
- Superorder: Hygrophila
- Family: Acroloxidae
- Genus: Acroloxus
- Species: A. coloradensis

Binomial name
- Acroloxus coloradensis J. Henderson, 1930

Species of gastropod

The Rocky Mountain capshell (Acroloxus coloradensis) is a species of freshwater snail in the family Acroloxidae, the river limpets. It is the only member of the family found in North America.

== Description ==
This snail has a flat brown and white shell with the apex on the posterior left side. It has clear growth lines and radial striae. It can be up to 5 millimeters long, 2.9 wide, and 1.2 tall.

== Distribution and habitat ==
The Rocky Mountain capshell is native to the Rocky Mountains of North America. It has been recorded in high-altitude ponds and lakes in Colorado, Montana, and Wyoming in the United States and British Columbia, Alberta, Ontario, and Quebec in Canada. It has also recently been found in some slowly flowing portions of the Beaver River in Alberta. Fossil specimens have been found in Nebraska, Kansas, and Oklahoma. The species occurs mainly at elevations between 8,500 and 10,000 feet. Below this altitude lake floor substrates are too fine, while above the abundance of calcium and other essential ions is too low.

== Biology ==
The diet of the snail is not well known, but it probably consumes microphytes, various microscopic algae.

Like all other pulmonates, this snail is hermaphroditic, and may fertilize itself or mate with other individuals. Its reproductive habits are poorly known, but they may be similar to those of other river limpets.

== Conservation ==
This is a relict species of isolated glacial mountain habitat, and its very small populations are scattered in widely separated locations. The populations have undergone bottlenecks. Its western and eastern populations are disjunct. Threats to the species include the loss and degradation of its alpine lake habitat from urbanization, particularly in parts of Colorado, pollution, drought, and recreation. Potential threats that are likely but have not yet been confirmed for the species include logging, mining, grazing, and exotic species.

Its overall NatureServe conservation status is G3 (vulnerable). Its state and province statuses are S1 (critically imperiled) in Colorado and Montana, S2 (imperiled) in Alberta, and S3 (vulnerable) in British Columbia.
