= Acroloxus egirdirensis =

Conservation status
- Vulnerable (IUCN 3.1)

Scientific classification
- Kingdom: Animalia
- Phylum: Mollusca
- Class: Gastropoda
- Superorder: Hygrophila
- Family: Acroloxidae
- Genus: Acroloxus
- Species: A. egirdirensis

Binomial name
- Acroloxus egirdirensis Shirokaya, 2012

Species of gastropod

Acroloxus egirdirensis is a species of very small freshwater snail, which because of their shape are known as limpets, aquatic pulmonate gastropods in the family Acroloxidae.

== Distribution ==
This freshwater limpet species is endemic to Lake Eğirdir in Turkey. It is found in the shallow waters along the north side of the lake.

=== Threats ===
The survival of this species is threatened by the accumulation of pesticides in the lake from surrounding orchards, as well as by soil erosion leading to siltation.
