= Acroloxus improvisus =

Conservation status
- Vulnerable (IUCN 3.1)

Scientific classification
- Kingdom: Animalia
- Phylum: Mollusca
- Class: Gastropoda
- Superorder: Hygrophila
- Family: Acroloxidae
- Genus: Acroloxus
- Species: A. improvisus

Binomial name
- Acroloxus improvisus Poliński, 1929

Species of gastropod

Acroloxus improvisus is a species of very small freshwater snail in the family Acroloxidae.
