= Acroloxus pseudolacustris =

Conservation status
- Data Deficient (IUCN 3.1)

Scientific classification
- Kingdom: Animalia
- Phylum: Mollusca
- Class: Gastropoda
- Superorder: Hygrophila
- Family: Acroloxidae
- Genus: Acroloxus
- Species: A. pseudolacustris

Binomial name
- Acroloxus pseudolacustris Glöer & Pešić, 2012

Species of gastropod

Acroloxus pseudolacustris is a species of very small freshwater snail, which because of their shape are known as limpets, aquatic pulmonate gastropods in the family Acroloxidae.

== Distribution ==
This freshwater limpet is endemic to Gīlān Province in Iran; it also possibly occurs in Māzandarān Province.
