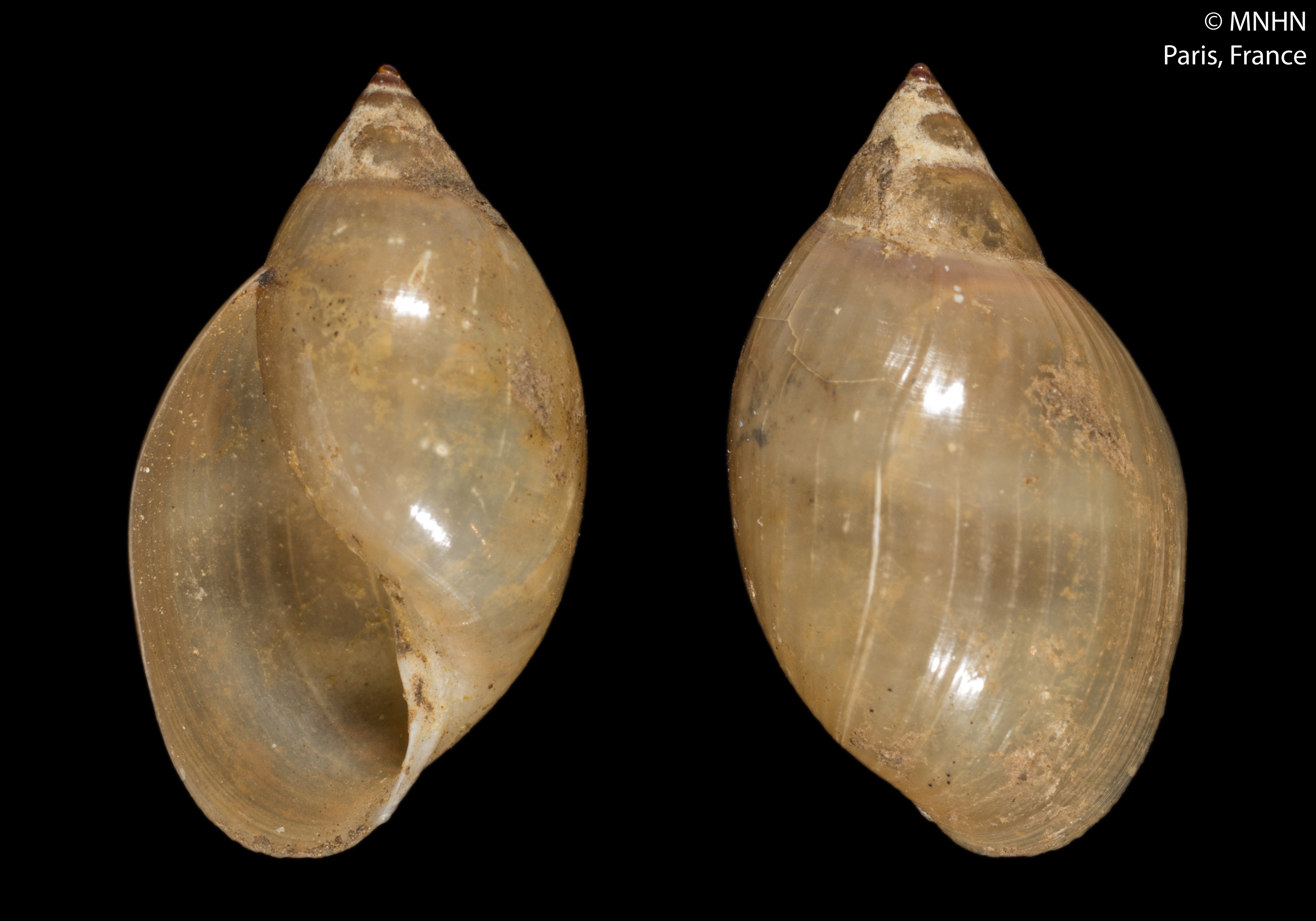
- Shell of Mexinauta impluviatus(syntype at MNHN, Paris)

Scientific classification
- Kingdom: Animalia
- Phylum: Mollusca
- Class: Gastropoda
- Superorder: Hygrophila
- Superfamily: Lymnaeoidea
- Family: Physidae
- Genus: Mexinauta; D. W. Taylor, 2003

Type species
- Physa nitens Philippi, 1841

= Mexinauta =

Genus of gastropods

Mexinauta is a genus of small, left-handed or sinistral, air-breathing freshwater snails, aquatic pulmonate gastropod mollusks in the subfamily Aplexinae of the family Physidae.

== Species ==
- Mexinauta aurantius (Carpenter, 1857)
- Mexinauta gracilentus (P. Fischer & Crosse, 1886)
- Mexinauta impluviatus (Morelet, 1849)
- Mexinauta laetus (E. von Martens, 1898)
- Mexinauta nicaraguanus (Morelet, 1851)
- Mexinauta nitens (Philippi, 1841)
- Mexinauta peruvianus (Gray, 1828)
- Mexinauta princeps (Phillips, 1846)

Synonyms

- Mexinauta aurantia (Carpenter, 1857): synonym of Mexinauta aurantius (Carpenter, 1857) (wrong gender agreement of specific epithet; Mexinauta is masculine")
