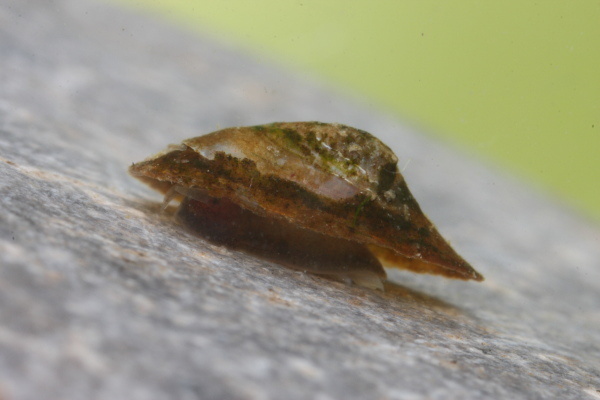
- Acroloxus lacustris Lake Constance
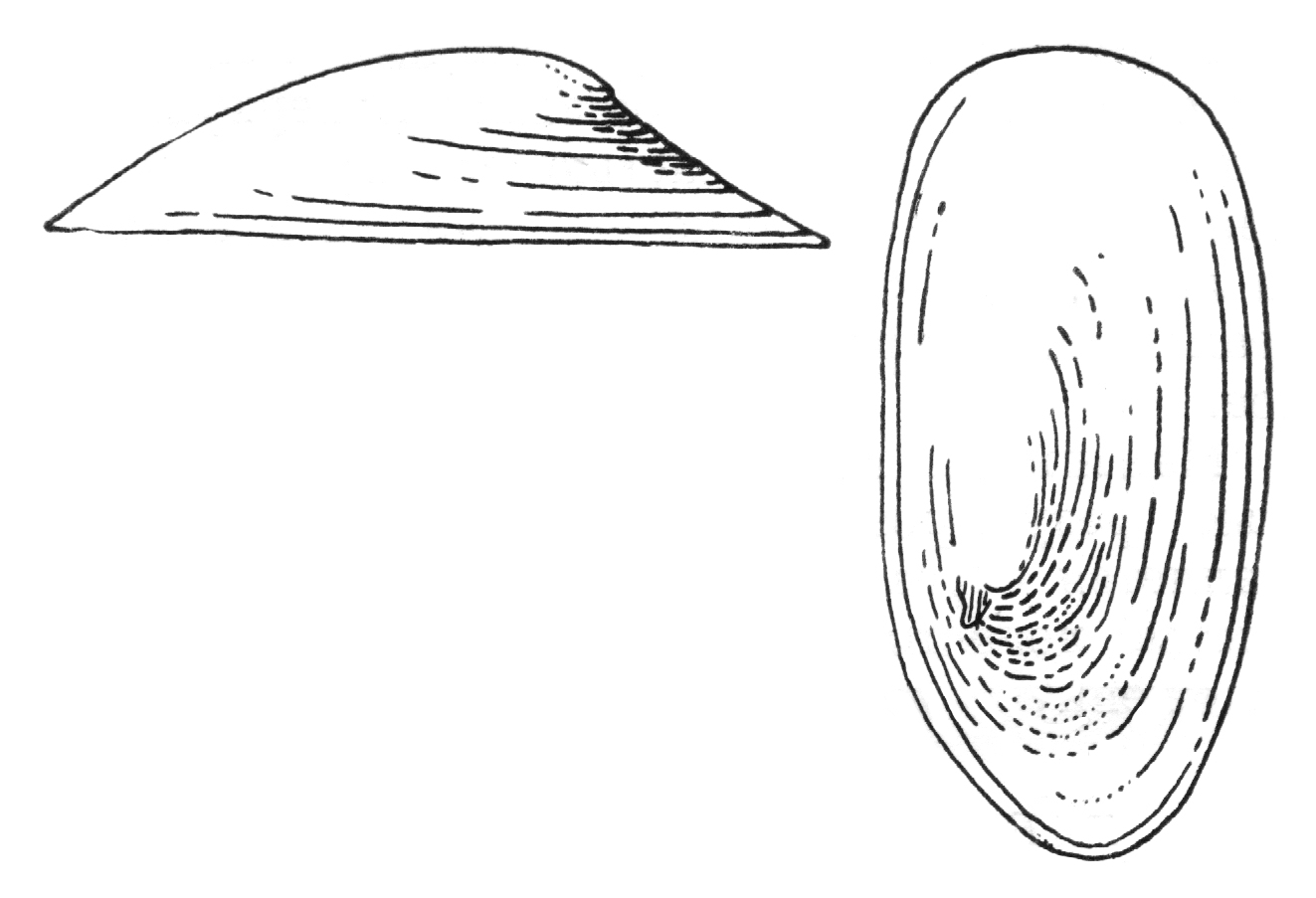
- Two views of a shell of Acroloxus lacustris

Conservation status
- Least Concern (IUCN 3.1)

Scientific classification
- Kingdom: Animalia
- Phylum: Mollusca
- Class: Gastropoda
- Superorder: Hygrophila
- Family: Acroloxidae
- Genus: Acroloxus
- Species: A. lacustris

Binomial name
- Acroloxus lacustris (Linnaeus, 1758)

Synonyms
- Acroloxus velkovrhi Bole, 1965

= Acroloxus lacustris =

Species of gastropod

Acroloxus lacustris, or the lake limpet, is a small freshwater limpet or snail, a species of aquatic gastropod mollusk in the family Acroloxidae.

== Description ==
The 4–7 mm. (7 mm long, 3 mm wide and 2 mm high) shell is laterally compressed elongate and limpet-like (no whorls and cone or hat shaped) with a sharp apex twisted to the left The colour is yellowish-grey to brown. The dimensions may vary depending on the substrate surface. On thin plant stems the shells are narrow, and more parallel-sided on leaves and stones they are rather wide oval.

== Distribution ==
Found across Europe to western and central Siberia. The distribution type is Eurosiberian Wide Temperate. This species of freshwater limpet is found in European countries and islands including:

- Belgium
- Croatia
- Czech Republic
- Slovakia
- Poland
- Germany
- Netherlands
- Great Britain
- Ireland
- For a full list see Fauna Europaea

== Habitat ==
Acroloxus lacustris prefers still water. It lives in lakes, rivers, etc.

== Conservation status ==
This species is listed as least concern by the IUCN red list.

It is thought to be extinct in Israel due to habitat loss.
