= Sibirenauta =

Scientific classification
- Kingdom: Animalia
- Phylum: Mollusca
- Class: Gastropoda
- Superorder: Hygrophila
- Family: Physidae
- Subfamily: Aplexinae
- Genus: Sibirenauta; Starobogatov & Streletzkaja, 1967

Diversity
- 4 species

Genus of gastropods

Sibirenauta is a genus of left-handed or sinistral, air-breathing freshwater snails, aquatic pulmonate gastropod mollusks in the family Physidae.

The scientific name Sibirenauta is composed from the word Siberia, where its species live and from the Latin word nauta, that means "sailor".

== Distribution ==
Distribution the genus Sibirenauta ranges from Siberia to Canada and the United States of America.

== Species ==
Species in the genus Sibirenauta include:

- Sibirenauta depressior (Middendorff, 1851) - type species
- Sibirenauta elongata (Say, 1821)
- Sibirenauta picta (Krause, 1883)
- Sibirenauta sibirica (Westerlund, 1877)
