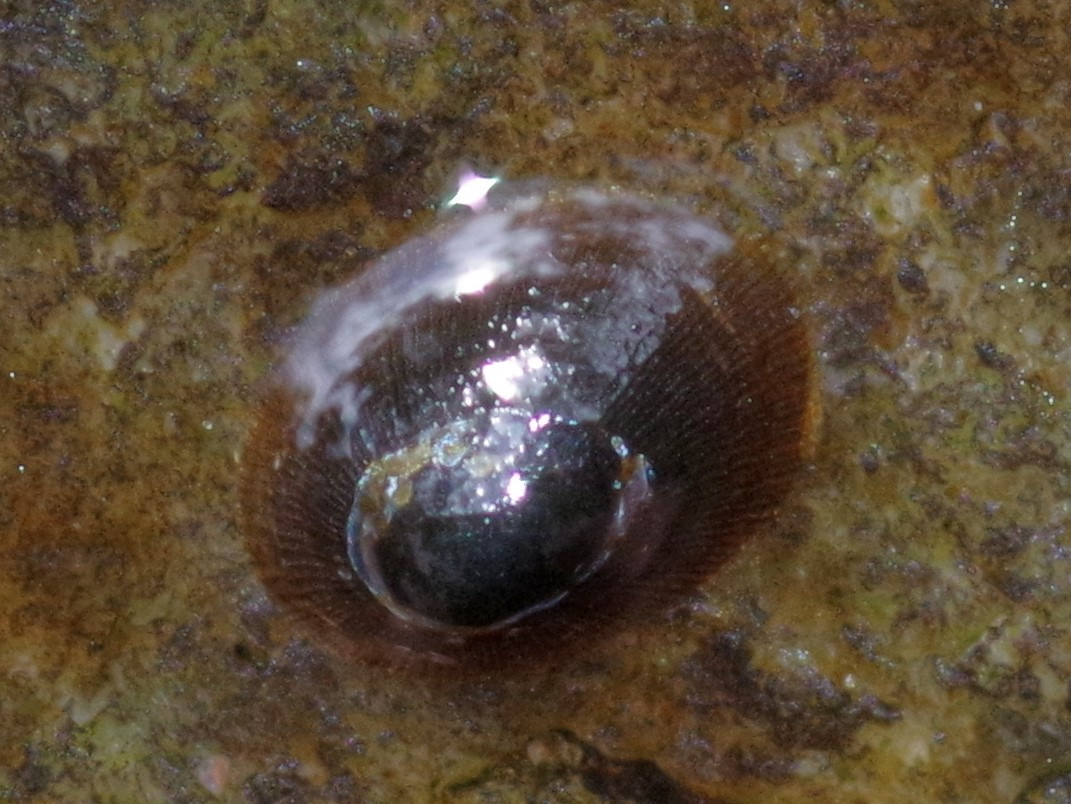

Scientific classification
- Kingdom: Animalia
- Phylum: Mollusca
- Class: Gastropoda
- Superorder: Hygrophila
- Superfamily: Lymnaeoidea
- Family: Burnupiidae; Albrecht, 2017
- Genus: Burnupia; Walker, 1912

Synonyms
- Ancylus (Burnupia) B. Walker, 1912

= Burnupia =

Genus of gastropods

Burnupia is a genus of small freshwater snails or limpets, aquatic gastropod mollusks. It was formerly placed in the family Planorbidae, but according to the molecular markers (COI, 18S rRNA), it is in a different clade than the genera of the family Planorbidae. It is now classified in the monotypic family Burnupiidae.

== Distribution and habitat ==
Species of the genus are generally confined to Africa and Brazil. They live in well-oxygenated freshwater habitats.

== Species ==
The following species are recognised in the genus Burnupia:

- Burnupia alta Pilsbry & Bequaert, 1927
- Burnupia brunnea B. Walker, 1924
- Burnupia caffra (Krauss, 1848)
- Burnupia capensis (B. Walker, 1912)
- Burnupia crassistriata (Preston, 1911)
- Burnupia edwardiana Pilsbry & Bequaert, 1927
- Burnupia farquhari (B. Walker, 1912)
- Burnupia gordonensis (Melvill & Ponsonby, 1903)
- Burnupia ingae Lanzer, 1991
- Burnupia kempi (Preston, 1912)
- Burnupia kimiloloensis Pilsbry & Bequaert, 1927
- Burnupia mooiensis (B. Walker, 1912)
- Burnupia nana (B. Walker, 1912)
- Burnupia obtusata B. Walker, 1926
- Burnupia ponsonbyi B. Walker, 1924
- Burnupia stenochorias (Melvill & Ponsonby, 1903)
- Burnupia stuhlmanni (E. von Martens, 1897)
- Burnupia transvaalensis (Craven, 1881)
- Burnupia trapezoidea (O. Boettger, 1910)
- Burnupia verreauxii (Bourguignat, 1853)
- Burnupia vulcanus B. Walker, 1924
- Burnupia walkeri Pilsbry & Bequaert, 1927
