= Burnupia stenochorias =

Conservation status
- Data Deficient (IUCN 3.1)

Scientific classification
- Kingdom: Animalia
- Phylum: Mollusca
- Class: Gastropoda
- Superorder: Hygrophila
- Family: Burnupiidae
- Genus: Burnupia
- Species: B. stenochorias

Binomial name
- Burnupia stenochorias (Melvill & Ponsonby, 1903)

Synonyms
- Ancylus stenochorias Melvill & Ponsonby, 1903

Species of gastropod

Burnupia stenochorias is a species of small freshwater snail or limpet, an aquatic gastropod mollusk in the ram's horn snail family Burnupiidae.

== Distribution ==
This freshwater limpet is found in South Africa.

== Ecology ==
Burnupia stenochorias (like all the other species in the genus Burnupia) lives in well-oxygenated freshwater habitats. Burnupia stenochorias is considered to be an ecotoxicological indicator of water quality, but it is not effectively used yet.
