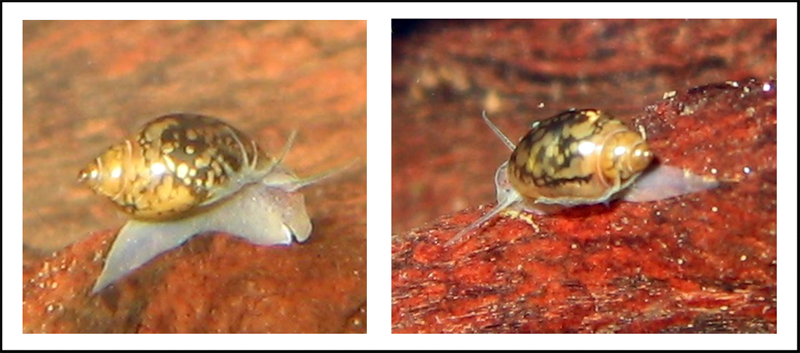
- Two views of a live individual of Stenophysa marmorata

Conservation status
- Secure (NatureServe)

Scientific classification
- Kingdom: Animalia
- Phylum: Mollusca
- Class: Gastropoda
- Superorder: Hygrophila
- Family: Physidae
- Genus: Stenophysa
- Species: S. marmorata

Binomial name
- Stenophysa marmorata (Guilding, 1828)

Synonyms
- Aplexa (Stenophysa) sowerbyana d'Orbigny, 1841 (junior synonym); Aplexa marmorata (Guilding, 1828); Aplexa rivalis antillarum H. Beck, 1838 (junior synonym); Limnea (Physa) rivalis G. B. Sowerby I, 1822; Physa acuminata A. Villa & G. B. Villa, 1841; Physa acuminata G. B. Sowerby II, 1873 (invalid: not Villa & Villa, 1841); Physa guadeloupensis Clessin, 1886 (invalid; not Mazé, 1883); Physa margaritacea E. von Martens, 1873 (junior synonym); Physa marmorata Guilding, 1828 (original combination); Physa salleana Dunker, 1853 (junior synonym); Physa sowerbyana d'Orbigny, 1841 (junior synonym); Physa ventricosa G. B. Sowerby II, 1873 (invalid; not Moquin-Tandon, 1855)

= Stenophysa marmorata =

Species of gastropod

Stenophysa marmorata, also known as marbled aplexa, is a species of small, air-breathing freshwater snail of the family Physidae.

== Distribution ==
This species occurs in the Lesser Antilles on Dominica. and St. Vincent
