= Burnupia ingae =

Scientific classification
- Kingdom: Animalia
- Phylum: Mollusca
- Class: Gastropoda
- Superorder: Hygrophila
- Family: Burnupiidae
- Genus: Burnupia
- Species: B. ingae

Binomial name
- Burnupia ingae Lanzer, 1991

Species of gastropod

Burnupia ingae is a species of small freshwater snail or limpet, an aquatic gastropod mollusc or micromollusk that was formerly placed in the family Planorbidae, the ram's horn snails and their allies. It is now classified in the family Burnupiidae.

== Geographic distribution ==
B. ingae is endemic to Brazil, where it occurs in all regions of the country. The species' type locality is Lagoa do Sombrio (Sombrio lagoon) in Sombrio, Santa Catarina.

== Description ==
B. ingae has a small shell, rarely reaching 3 millimetres (0.12 in) in length. The aperture is oval. The apex is rounded, not recurved, with a smooth apical depression. The protoconch shows a band of radially arranged punctuations after the smooth apical area. The radial lines on the teleoconch are curved and may cover the whole shell. In some specimens the periostracum forms rounded protuberances on the radial lines. The right anterior muscular impression is longitudinally elongated, the left anterior one rounded and the posterior one elongated-oval shaped. The mantle shows no pigmentation. The radula has a slightly asymmetric rachidian tooth with two main cusps and a minor cusp between them and two to four accessory cusps laterally. The marginal teeth are elongated, with four to seven lateral cusps to the ectocone.

== Habitat and ecology ==
B. ingae (like all the other species in the genus Burnupia) lives in well-oxygenated freshwater habitats, especially on stones in streams and at the edges of lentic water bodies.

== See also ==
- List of non-marine molluscs of Brazil
