= Burnupia crassistriata =

Conservation status
- Near Threatened (IUCN 3.1)

Scientific classification
- Kingdom: Animalia
- Phylum: Mollusca
- Class: Gastropoda
- Superorder: Hygrophila
- Family: Burnupiidae
- Genus: Burnupia
- Species: B. crassistriata

Binomial name
- Burnupia crassistriata (Preston, 1911)

Synonyms
- Ancylus crassistriatus Preston, 1911

Species of gastropod

Burnupia crassistriata is a species of small freshwater snail or limpet, an aquatic gastropod mollusk which was formerly placed in the family Planorbidae, the ram's horn snails and their allies. It is now classified in the family Burnupiidae.

It was previously listed as a vulnerable species in the IUCN Red List of Threatened Species (2004).

== Distribution ==
This species of freshwater limpet is endemic to Kenya. Its natural habitat is rivers. It is threatened by habitat loss.
