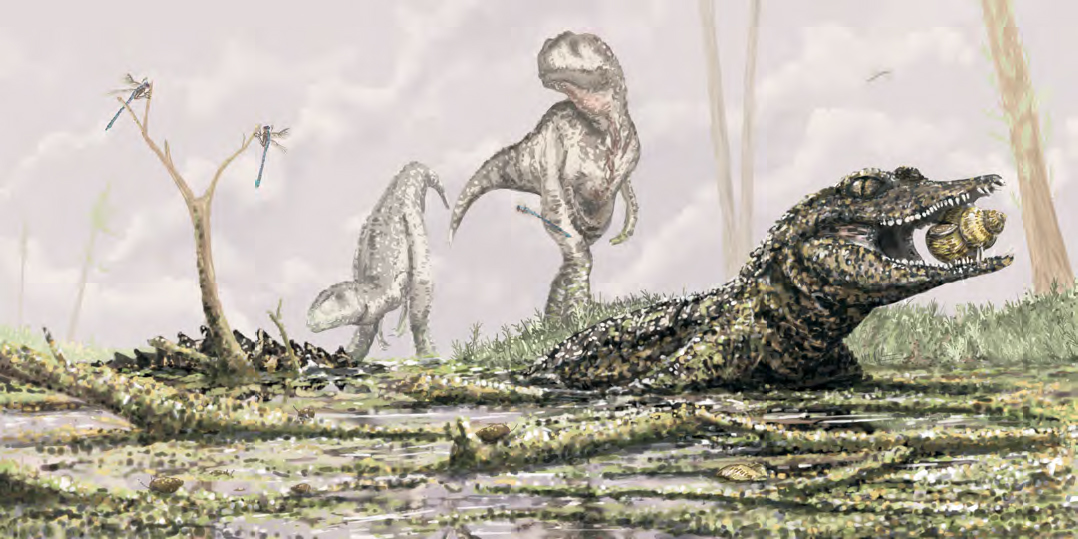
- Smaller gastropods shown in the foreground include Prophysa sp.

Scientific classification
- Kingdom: Animalia
- Phylum: Mollusca
- Class: Gastropoda
- Superorder: Hygrophila
- Family: Physidae
- Genus: †Prophysa; Bandel, 1991
- Species: †P. bristovii

Binomial name
- †Prophysa bristovii (J. Phillips, 1855)

= Prophysa =

Genus of gastropods

Prophysa is a genus of freshwater snails, an aquatic gastropod molluscs from the Mesozoic. The only species is Prophysa bristovii.
