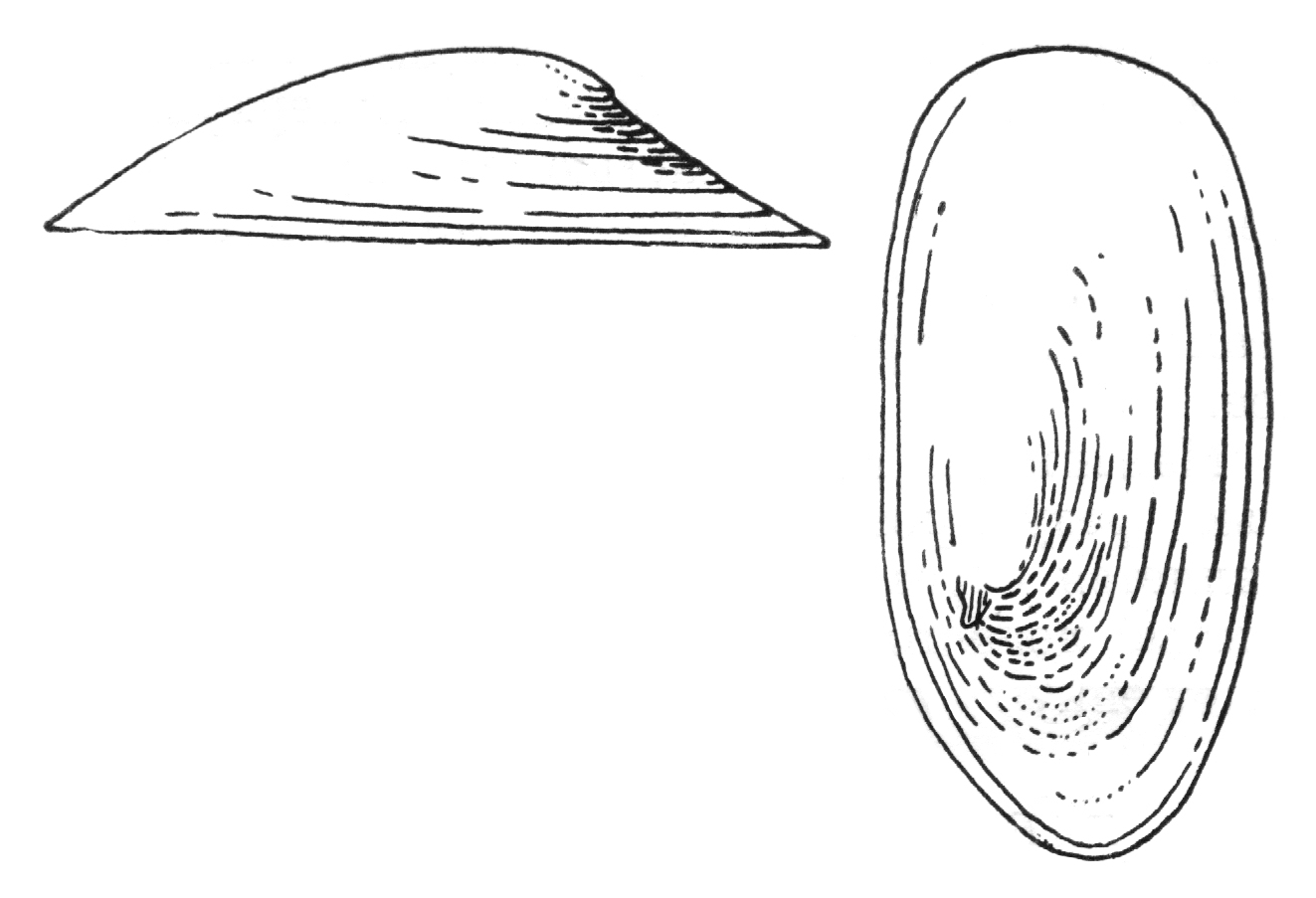
- Two views of a shell of Acroloxus lacustris

Scientific classification
- Kingdom: Animalia
- Phylum: Mollusca
- Class: Gastropoda
- Superorder: Hygrophila
- Family: Acroloxidae
- Genus: Acroloxus; Beck, 1838

= Acroloxus =

Genus of gastropods

Acroloxus is a genus of very small, air-breathing, freshwater snails, or more precisely limpets, aquatic pulmonate gastropods in the family Acroloxidae.

== Species ==
Species in the genus Acroloxus include:

- Acroloxus coloradensis J. Henderson, 1930 - Rocky Mountain capshell
- Acroloxus egirdirensis Shirokaya, 2012
- Acroloxus improvisus Polinski, 1929
- Acroloxus lacustris (Linnaeus, 1758) - Lake limpet
- Acroloxus macedonicus Hadžišce, 1959
- Acroloxus pseudolacustris, Glöer & Pešić, 2012
- Acroloxus tetensi (Kušcer, 1832)
