= Clivunellidae =

Clivunellidae Temporal range: Miocene

Scientific classification
- Kingdom: Animalia
- Phylum: Mollusca
- Class: Gastropoda
- Superorder: Hygrophila
- Superfamily: Lymnaeoidea
- Family: †Clivunellidae; Kochansky-Devidé & Slišković,1972

Genera
- Clivunella

Extinct mollusk genus

Clivunellidae is an extinct family of macrobenthic gastropod molluscs, described by Kochansky-Devidé & Slišković in 1972.

== Distribution ==
Fossils of Clivunellidae have been discovered in Miocene deposits of paleolakes within the Dinaride Lake System in southeastern Europe. This family is believed to have evolved exclusively within that ancient lake system.

== Genera ==
- Clivunella Katzer, 1918
