= Burnupia stuhlmanni =

Conservation status
- Near Threatened (IUCN 3.1)

Scientific classification
- Kingdom: Animalia
- Phylum: Mollusca
- Class: Gastropoda
- Superorder: Hygrophila
- Family: Burnupiidae
- Genus: Burnupia
- Species: B. stuhlmanni

Binomial name
- Burnupia stuhlmanni (Von Martens, 1897)

Species of gastropod

Burnupia stuhlmanni is a species of small freshwater snail or limpet, an aquatic gastropod mollusk which was formerly placed in the family Planorbidae, the ram's horn snails and their allies. It is now classified in the family Burnupiidae.

== Distribution ==
This freshwater limpet is found in Kenya, Tanzania, and Uganda. Its natural habitats are rivers and freshwater lakes.
