= Clivunella =

Clivunella Temporal range: Miocene

Scientific classification
- Kingdom: Animalia
- Phylum: Mollusca
- Class: Gastropoda
- Superorder: Hygrophila
- Family: †Clivunellidae
- Genus: †Clivunella; Kochansky-Devidé & Slišković, 1972

Extinct mollusk genus

Clivunella is an extinct genus of macrobenthic gastropod molluscs, first formally described by F. Katzer in 1918.

== Distribution ==
Fossils of Clivunella have been discovered in Miocene deposits of paleolakes within the Dinaride Lake System in southeastern Europe.

== Species ==
- † Clivunella conica Gorjanović-Kramberger, 1923
- † Clivunella elliptica Kochansky-Devidé & Slišković, 1972
- † Clivunella katzeri Gorjanović-Kramberger, 1909
- † Clivunella zilchi Schütt, 1976
