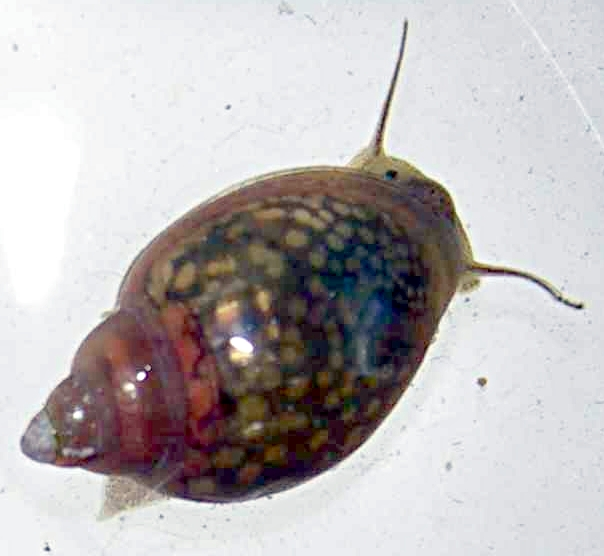
- A live individual of Physella acuta from the Mediterranean area

Scientific classification
- Kingdom: Animalia
- Phylum: Mollusca
- Class: Gastropoda
- Subterclass: Tectipleura
- Superorder: Hygrophila
- Superfamily: Lymnaeoidea
- Family: Physidae; Fitzinger, 1833

Type genus
- Physa Draparnaud, 1801

Diversity
- About 80 freshwater species

= Physidae =

Family of molluscs

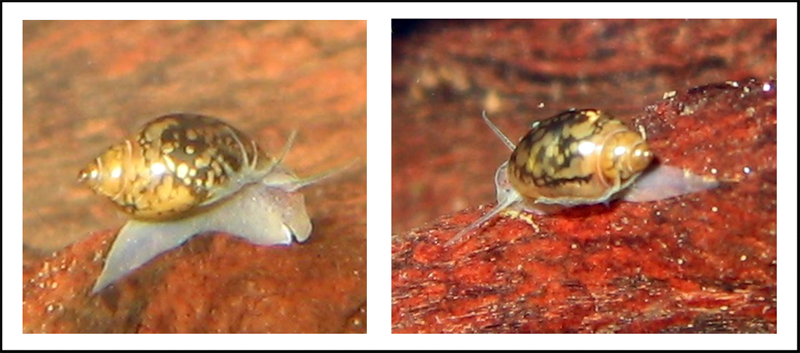
Physa marmorata in France.

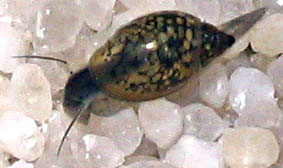
Physella heterostropha halei of the Central and Southern USA, about 1 cm long.

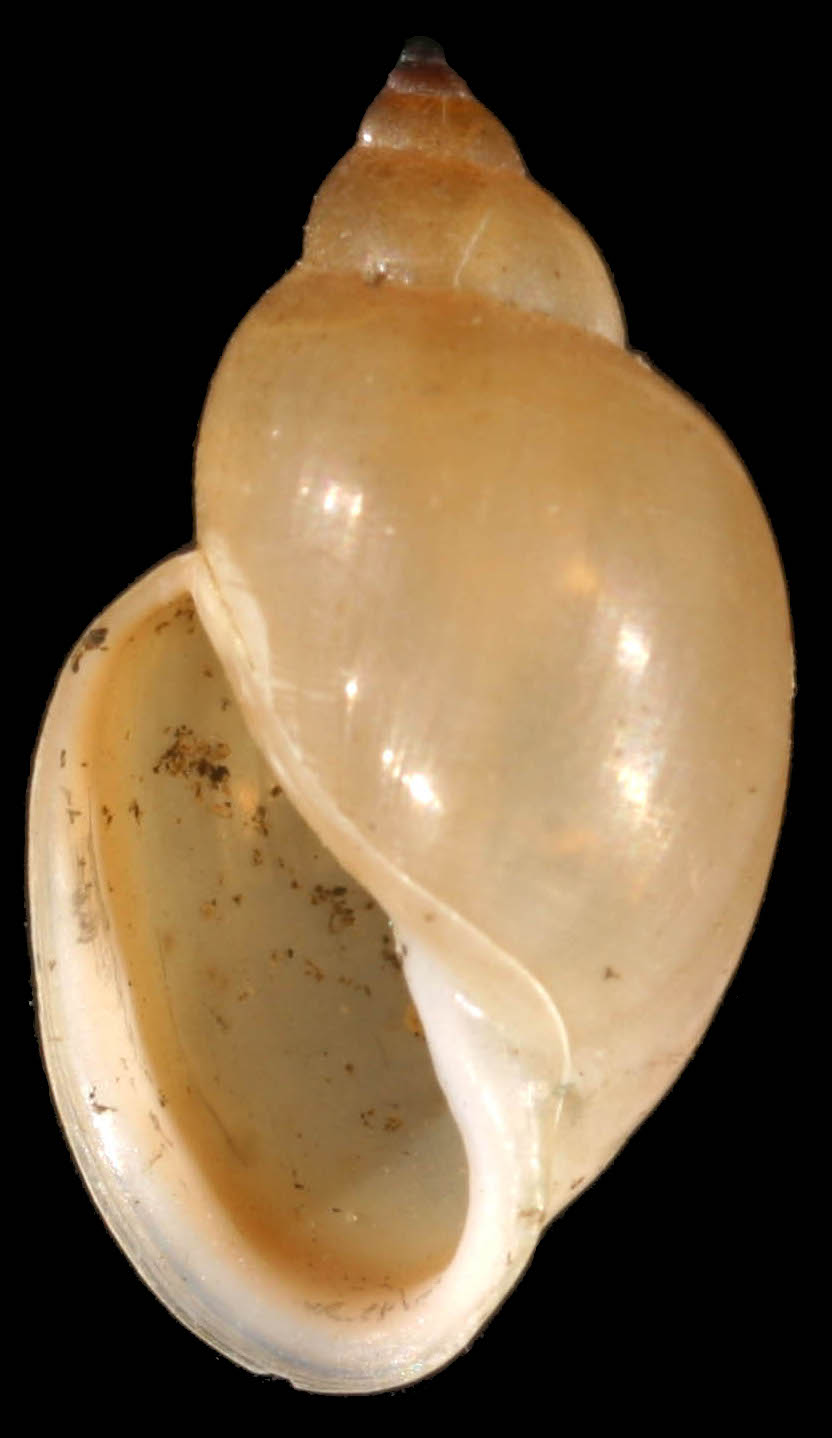
The sinistral shell of Physella acuta

Physidae, commonly called the bladder snails, is a family of small air-breathing freshwater snails, aquatic pulmonate gastropod molluscs in the superfamily Lymnaeoidea.

== Overview ==
These fresh water snails are present in aquariums and ponds, as well as in wild areas. They are also commonly referred to as tadpole snails or pouch snails. They eat algae, diatoms and detritus, including dead leaves. The populations are regulated by the abundance of food and space. They are widespread, abundant, and tolerant to pollution.

These snails are common in the North Temperate to Arctic Zones and throughout the Americas, in readily accessible habitats such as ditches, ponds, lakes, small streams, and rivers. The family has been recognized since the 19th century, and yet there has been no classification in which relationships between genera are clarified, no agreement on what characters are primitive or advanced, and no consistent ranking. Scarcity of careful morphological studies is the principal cause. The differences in the group have led to the creation of more than 23 genera, four grades and four clades within the family. The two established subfamilies are divided into seven new tribes including 11 new genera. Within this family, the shell is always sinistral, in other words it has left-handed coiling. Physidae has 23 genera, 17 occur in Pacific drainages of North and Central America, eight of these restricted to the region. Concentration of primitive genera along the Pacific coast from Mexico to Costa Rica conforms to previous observations that primitive pulmonate families are concentrated within, or along the continental margins of, the Pacific Ocean. An ancestral origin of Physidae along an ancient eastern Pacific coast is probable. From this region the several lineages have spread to north, south and east in the Americas, and through Siberia to Europe.

== Ecology ==
These small snails are quite distinctive, because they have sinistral shells, which means that if the shell is held such that the spire is pointing up and the aperture is facing the observer, then the aperture is on the left-hand side. The shells of Physidae species have a long and large aperture, a pointed spire, and no operculum. The shells are thin and corneous, and rather transparent. Studies in 1982 indicate that they are most abundant in the New World. They have evidently found a shell morphology suitable for their life station, as he goes on to say "...the physids have undergone considerable diversification, much of which is not clearly exhibited in their shells. Many of the species, and genera, are not easy to identify on shell characters alone."

They have been used in studies of ecophenotypic plasticity, a so-called phenoplastic switch. Burt Vaughan of Washington State University indicates several studies in M. J. West-Eberhardt's recent compendium of research, "Developmental Plasticity & Evolution" (Oxford Press, 2003, pp. 307–362). A typical example involved rearing Physa gyrina, or Physa heterostropha in controlled pair groups in either water in which crayfish co-existed or water in which only fish co-existed. Within a month, differences in shell morphology appeared; i.e., snails exposed to shell-crushing fish predators showed wide apertures and very much strengthened, rotund shells. Snails exposed to crayfish only showed narrow-apertured, thin elongate shells, with barricading teeth.

In 1921, the strong reaction of Physa to contact with leeches was first observed. Later studies have also been made. The observations are restricted to Physa fontinalis, an indigenous species to areas with indigenous predatory leeches, and Haitia acuta, introduced in Germany and the Netherlands. When Physa contacts another snail, either Physa or some other kind, the reaction is a rapid twisting of the shell back and forth to dislodge the other. The muscle used is the "physid muscle", not found in other Hygrophila, which therefore do not show this reaction. The leech-avoidance reaction carries the action one step further: on contact with a leech the snail twists its shell violently and detaches its foot from the substratum as well. The reaction of two species of Physids to various species of leeches and to various salts was studied. In Haitia acuta, the avoidance reaction was much less pronounced than in Physa fontinalis. The highest percentage of reactions in Physa were obtained with the two species of leeches that feed chiefly on snails. The nature of the substance that produces the reaction is undetermined, but presumably it is a protein.

== Taxonomy ==
According to ITIS and WoRMS, this family is classified into 4 genera, although the 4 genera from each database has a little bit difference. The classification from the taxonomy by Bouchet & Rocroi (2005), which is based on classification by Taylor (2003): Taylor classifies Physidae according to the anatomical differences of their penis, the differences among the penial complex, penial sheath and preputium. Thus, the Physidae is classified into two subfamilies, four grades and seven tribes. This classification with tribes is no longer used by WoRMS.

- subfamily Physinae Fitzinger, 1833: Preputial gland present
  - tribe Haitiini D.W. Taylor, 2003
  - tribe Physini Fitzinger, 1833
  - tribe Physellini D. W. Taylor, 2003
- subfamily Aplexinae Starobogatov, 1967: Preputial gland absent
  - tribe Aplexini Starobogatov, 1967
  - tribe Amecanautini D. W. Taylor, 2003
  - tribe Austrinautini D. W. Taylor, 2003
  - tribe Stenophysini D. W. Taylor, 2003

Genera in the family Physidae include

- † Berellaia De Laubrière & Carez, 1881 †
- † Hannibalina Hanna & Gester, 1963 †
- † Prophysa Bandel, 1991

=== Subfamily Aplexinae ===
Aplexini

- Amuraplexa Starobotatov, Prozorova & Zatravkin, 1989
- Aplexa Fleming, 1820 - aplexa, type genus of the subfamily Aplexinae
- Paraplexa Starobogatov, 1989
- Sibirenauta Starobogatov & Streletzkaja, 1967

Amecanautini

- Amecanauta D. W. Taylor, 2003 - type genus of the tribe Amecanautini
- Mayabina Taylor, 2003
- Mexinauta Taylor, 2003
- Tropinauta Taylor, 2003

Austrinautini

- Austrinauta D. W. Taylor, 2003 - type genus of the tribe Austrinautini
- Caribnauta Taylor, 2003

Stenophysini

- Afrophysa Starobogatov, 1967
- Stenophysa von Martens, 1898 - type genus of the tribe Stenophysini

=== Subfamily Physinae ===
Haitiini

- Haitia Clench & Aguayo, 1932 - type genus of the tribe Haitiini

Physini

- Beringophysa Starobogatov & Budnikova, 1976
- Laurentiphysa Taylor, 2003
- Physa Draparnaud, 1801 - type genus of the family Physidae

Physellini

- Archiphysa Taylor, 2003
- Chiapaphysa Taylor, 2003
- Petrophysa Pilsbry, 1926
- Physella Haldemann, 1843 - type genus of the tribe Physellini
- Ultraphysella Taylor, 2003
- Utahphysa Taylor, 2003

Genera brought into synonymy

- Aplecta Herrmannsen, 1846: synonym of Aplexa J. Fleming, 1820 (invalid: an incorrect subsequent spelling of Aplexa)
- Archiphysa D. W. Taylor, 2003: synonym of Physella Haldeman, 1842 (a junior synonym)
- Costatella Dall, 1870: synonym of Physella (Costatella) Dall, 1870 represented as Physella Haldeman, 1842
- Haitia Clench & Aguayo, 1932: synonym of Physella (Acutiana) Fagot, 1883 represented as Physella Haldeman, 1842
- Laurentiphysa Taylor, 2003: synonym of Physa Draparnaud, 1801 (a junior synonym)
- Rivicola Fitzinger, 1833: synonym of Physa Draparnaud, 1801 (Invalid: junior objective synonym of Physa, with the same type species)

== Aquarium use ==
Physid snails are often introduced to an aquarium accidentally as eggs on aquatic plants. These snails are sometimes viewed as pests in aquarium tanks with fish, because the snails create waste, reproduce very often, and are very hard to remove completely. However, some aquarium owners deliberately choose to add these freshwater pond snails to their tank because the snails will eat uneaten fish food, algae and waste, as well as unwanted fish carcasses.
