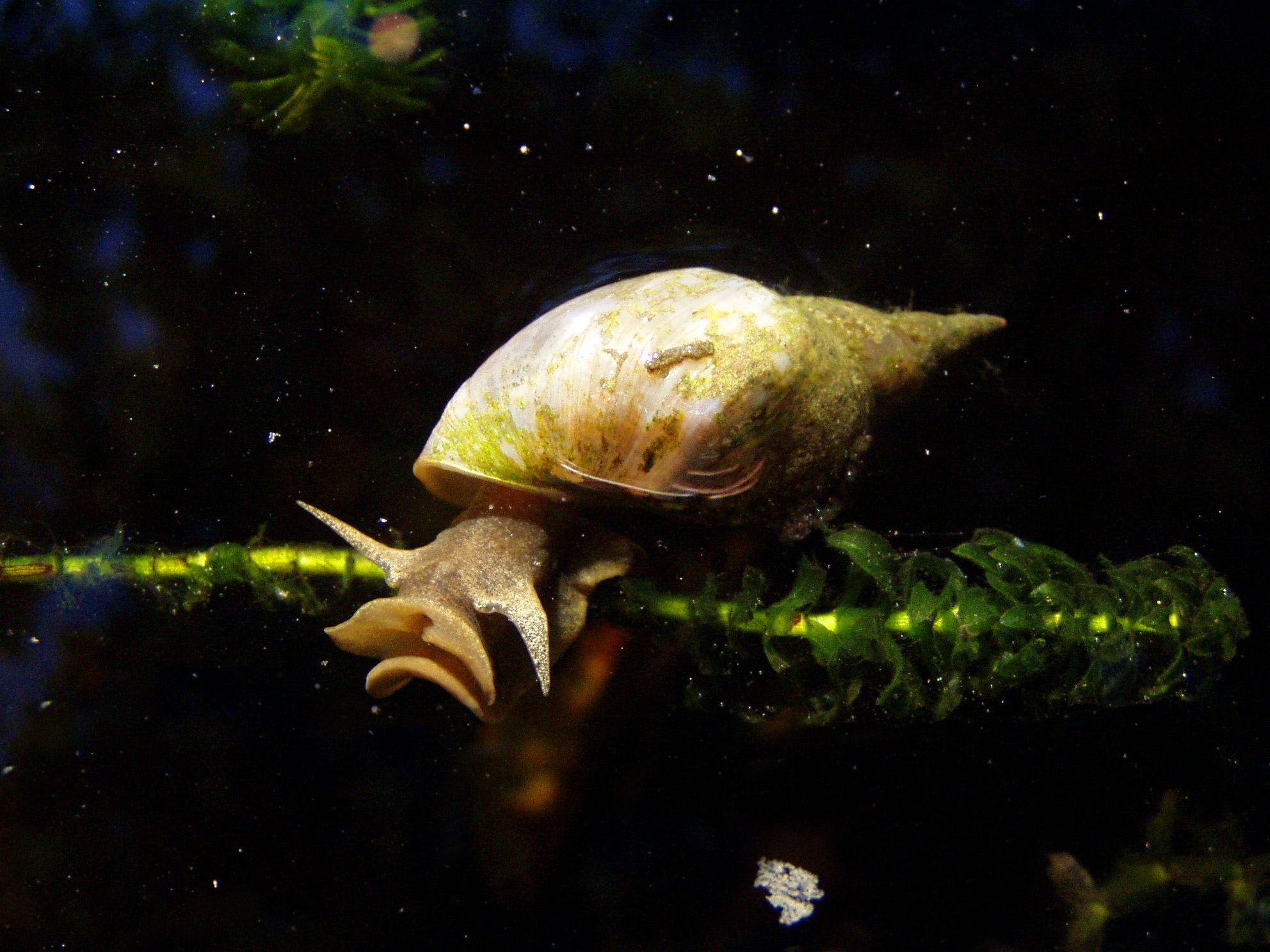
- Lymnaea stagnalis

Scientific classification
- Kingdom: Animalia
- Phylum: Mollusca
- Class: Gastropoda
- Infraclass: Euthyneura
- Subterclass: Tectipleura
- Superorder: Hygrophila
- Superfamily: Lymnaeoidea; Rafinesque, 1815

Families
- See text

Synonyms
- Acroloxoidea Thiele, 1931; Planorboidea Rafinesque, 1815

= Lymnaeoidea =

Superfamily of gastropods

Lymnaeoidea is a taxonomic superfamily of air-breathing freshwater snails that belong to the superorder Hygrophila.

== Families ==
- Acroloxidae Thiele, 1931
- Bulinidae P. Fischer & Crosse, 1880
- Burnupiidae Albrecht, 2017
- Clivunellidae Kochansky-Devidé & Slišković, 1972 †
- Lymnaeidae Rafinesque, 1815
- Physidae Fitzinger, 1833
- Planorbidae Rafinesque, 1815

Families brought into synonymy

- Ancylidae Rafinesque, 1815: synonym of Ancylinae Rafinesque, 1815
- Limnophysidae W. Dybowski, 1903: synonym of Lymnaeidae Rafinesque, 1815 (a junior synonym)
- Rhodacmeidae B. Walker, 1917 : synonym of Ancylinae Rafinesque, 1815(a junior synonym)

== Bibliography ==
- Bouchet P., Rocroi J.P., Hausdorf B., Kaim A., Kano Y., Nützel A., Parkhaev P., Schrödl M. & Strong E.E. (2017). Revised classification, nomenclator and typification of gastropod and monoplacophoran families. Malacologia. 61(1-2): 1-526
