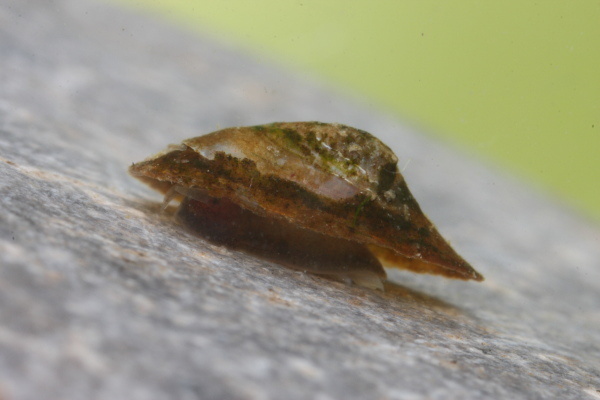
- A left side view of a live Acroloxus lacustris
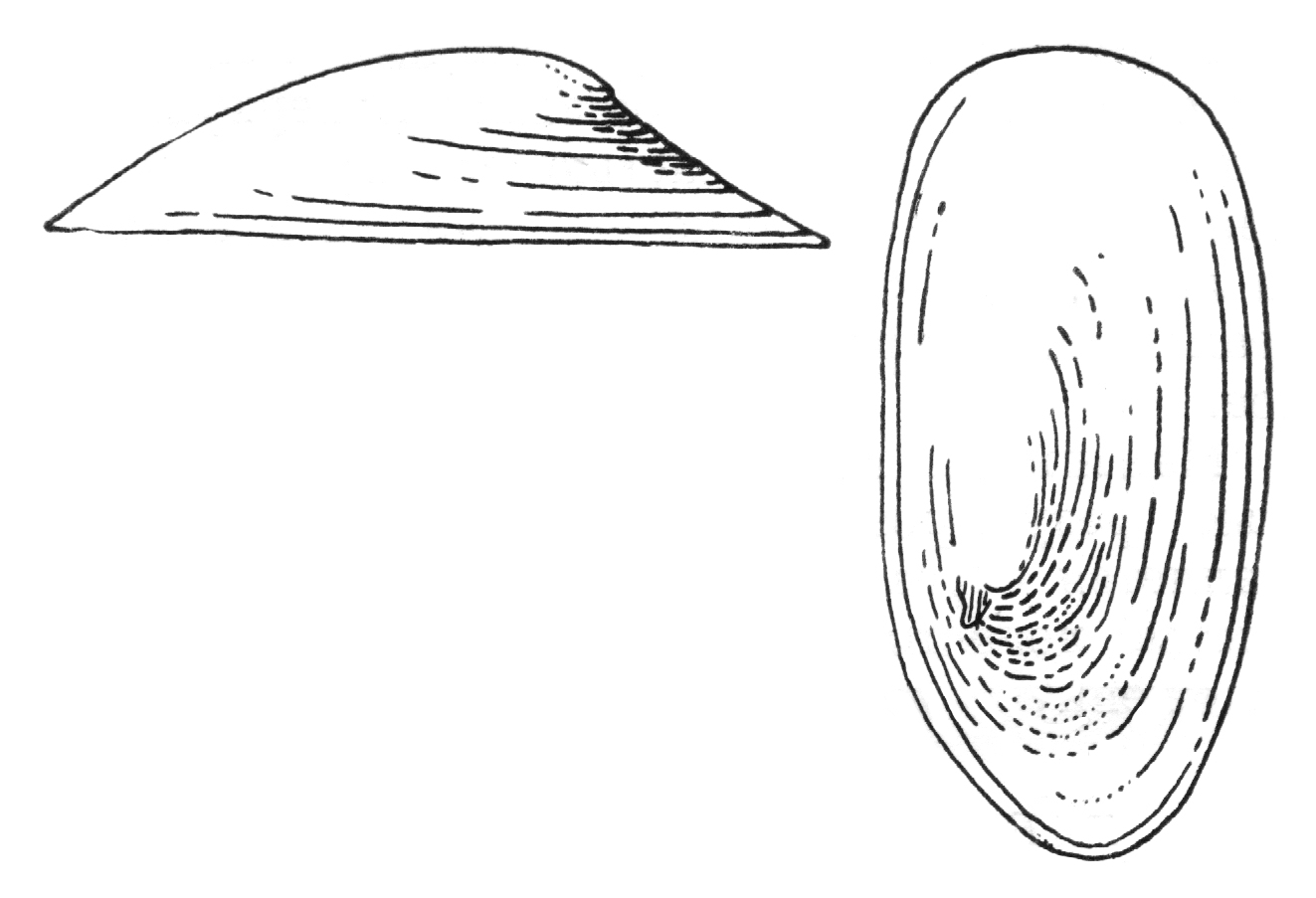
- Two views of a shell of Acroloxus lacustris

Scientific classification
- Kingdom: Animalia
- Phylum: Mollusca
- Class: Gastropoda
- Superorder: Hygrophila
- Superfamily: Lymnaeoidea
- Family: Acroloxidae; Thiele, 1931

Diversity
- About 40 freshwater species

= Acroloxidae =

Family of gastropods

Acroloxidae, commonly known as river limpets, are a taxonomic family of very small, freshwater snails, aquatic pulmonate gastropod limpet-like mollusks with a simple flattened conical shell in the clade Hygrophila.

Acroloxidae is the only family within the superfamily Acroloxoidea (according to the taxonomy of the Gastropoda by Bouchet & Rocroi, 2005).

== Distribution ==
Worldwide.

== Anatomy ==
Pulmones are reduced. Sexual cavity and accessory gills are on the right side.

== Genera ==
Genera within the family Acroloxidae include:

- Acroloxus Beck, 1838 - type genus
- Baicalancylus Starobogatov, 1967
- Frolikhiancylus Sitnikova & Starobogatov, 1993
- Gerstfeldtiancylus Starobogatov, 1989
- Pseudancylastrum Lindholm, 1909

Synonyms

- Costovelletia Starobogatov, 1991: synonym of Acroloxus H. Beck, 1838 (a junior synonym)
- Dinarancylus Starobogatov, 1991: synonym of Acroloxus H. Beck, 1838 (a junior synonym)
- Velletia J. E. Gray, 1840: synonym of Acroloxus H. Beck, 1838 (junior objective synonym)
