= Chloronia marthae =

Scientific classification
- Kingdom: Animalia
- Phylum: Arthropoda
- Clade: Pancrustacea
- Class: Insecta
- Order: Megaloptera
- Family: Corydalidae
- Genus: Chloronia
- Species: C. marthae

Binomial name
- Chloronia marthae Contreras-Ramos, 2002

Species of dobsonfly

Chloronia marthae is a species of dobsonfly found in Colombia and Venezuela.

== Description ==
There are a pair of dark posterolateral egg-shaped spots anterior to the occiput. The forewing has greyish spots on the membrane of the median and radial cells, with paired or single spots on cubital and anal spaces. The posterior margin of the wing at the basal half has numerous dark spots. It is otherwise most similar to the C. pallida species group (including C. gloriosoi, C. mexicana, C. palida, and C. mirifica). All of these, including C. marthae, has a bilobed ninth sternum. The most similar species of these is C. mirifica because of the tenth sternite having trianguloid lobes. C. mirifica can be separated by the absence of long setae on the posterior side of the ninth gonostylus, close to the apex, which is present in C. marthae. Chloronia marthae has unusually long antennae, which is hypothesized to separate it from C. mirifica. The length of the male forewing is 27–35 mm and the female forewing is 29–33 mm.

== Taxonomy ==
Chloronia marthae is possibly a junior synonym of C. mirifica, because the diagnostic characters of C. marthae may fall into the intraspecific variation of C. mirifica. C. marthae is separated by antennal length and the presence a preapical tuft of long setae on gonostylus 9, but a specimen collected in the Colombian Amazonia had the genital structure matching C. marthae, but with the antennal length of C. mirifica.

== Etymology ==
The specific epithet "marthae" is a tribute to the wife of the author, Martha Reguero, who in the words of the author "has been a steady and unconditional source of support in all his [the author's] academic ventures".
