= Chloronia yungas =

Scientific classification
- Kingdom: Animalia
- Phylum: Arthropoda
- Clade: Pancrustacea
- Class: Insecta
- Order: Megaloptera
- Family: Corydalidae
- Genus: Chloronia
- Species: C. yungas

Binomial name
- Chloronia yungas Contreras-Ramos, 2006

Dobsonfly species

Chloronia yungas is a species of dobsonfly found in Bolivia and Peru.

== Description ==
Chloronia yungas has a somewhat long dark posterolateral marking, so it resembles other species with dark posterolateral dark markings on the head, i.e. the two species C. pennyi and C. gaianii. C. bogotana is distinguished by having a continuous unbroken posterolateral marking on the head (it is broken up in C. yungas). Other species may have other types of posterolateral markings such as dots or brownish bands, but the short and wide band in C. glorosoi is perhaps most similar of the remaining species. None of the species mentioned are completely similar in pattern, however, and may be distinguished by comparing figures from different publications. C. yungas is also readily distinguished via the male genitalia and the 9th sternite of the male.

== Ecology ==
Chloronia yungas seemingly prefers montane forests on the eastern slopes of the Andes at an elevation from 1,000–1,600 meters.

== Etymology ==
The specific epithet "yungas" is derived from Las Yungas, which is contains one of the localities from which some of the type specimens were collected.
