= Chloronia pennyi =

Scientific classification
- Kingdom: Animalia
- Phylum: Arthropoda
- Clade: Pancrustacea
- Class: Insecta
- Order: Megaloptera
- Family: Corydalidae
- Genus: Chloronia
- Species: C. pennyi

Binomial name
- Chloronia pennyi Contreras-Ramos, 2000

Species of insect

Chloronia pennyi is a species of dobsonfly possibly endemic to Brazil. As of 2024, it is only known from its type series, which consists of 5 specimens including the holotype.

== Description ==
This species is probably most closely related to C. corripiens and C. plaumanni, likely the most basal members of the genus. All three species have an unmodified ninth sternite, dorsolateral pregenital sacks between the eighth and ninth abdominal segments, and are lacking small clusters of setae on the ninth sternum. Despite this, C. pennyi mostly resembles C. bogotana. They both have posterolateral spots on the head and two elongate longitudinal markings on the pronotum. The pronotal spots in C. bogotana don't meet in the middle, while they do meet in C. pennyi. C. bogotana has patterned forewings with mostly dark crossveins, but the forewings of C. pennyi are mostly unpatterned and with only a few slightly darkend crossveins. The length of the male forewing is 27.4–29.4 mm and the length of the female forewing is 34.3–34.7 mm.

== Etymology ==
The specific epithet "pennyi" is a tribute to Norman D. Penny from the California Academy of Sciences because of his contributions Neotropical neuropterology (the study of neuroptera). He was also a supporter of the author's graduate research projects.
