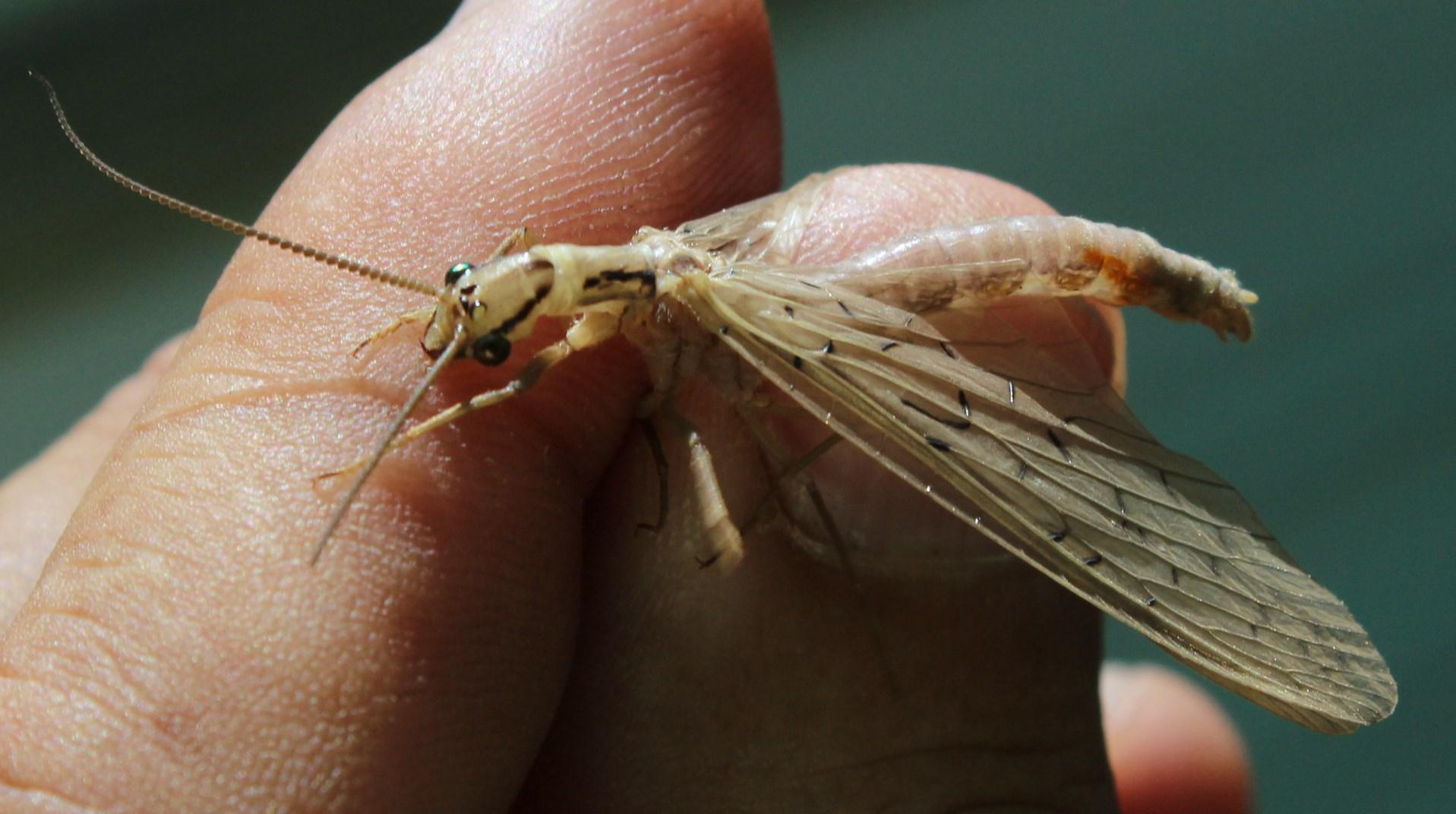

Scientific classification
- Kingdom: Animalia
- Phylum: Arthropoda
- Clade: Pancrustacea
- Class: Insecta
- Order: Megaloptera
- Family: Corydalidae
- Genus: Chloroniella; Esben-Petersen, 1924
- Species: C. peringueyi

Binomial name
- Chloroniella peringueyi Esben-Petersen, 1924

= Chloroniella =

Genus of dobsonfly endemic to South Africa

Chloroniella is a monotypic genus of dobsonflies in the family Corydalidae that is endemic to South Africa. The only species is Chloroniella peringueyi, the Cape dobsonfly.

== Distribution ==
Chloroniella is found in the Western Cape in South Africa.

== Taxonomy ==
A 2025 study made the following phylogeny using molecular techniques. It placed this genus as the most basal member of the subfamily Corydalinae (dobsonflies):

- Corydalinae
  - Chloroniella
  - - Protohermes
    - - - Acanthacorydalis
        - - Platyneuromus
          - - Chloronia
            - Corydalus
      - - Nevromus
        - Neoneuromus

== Gallery ==
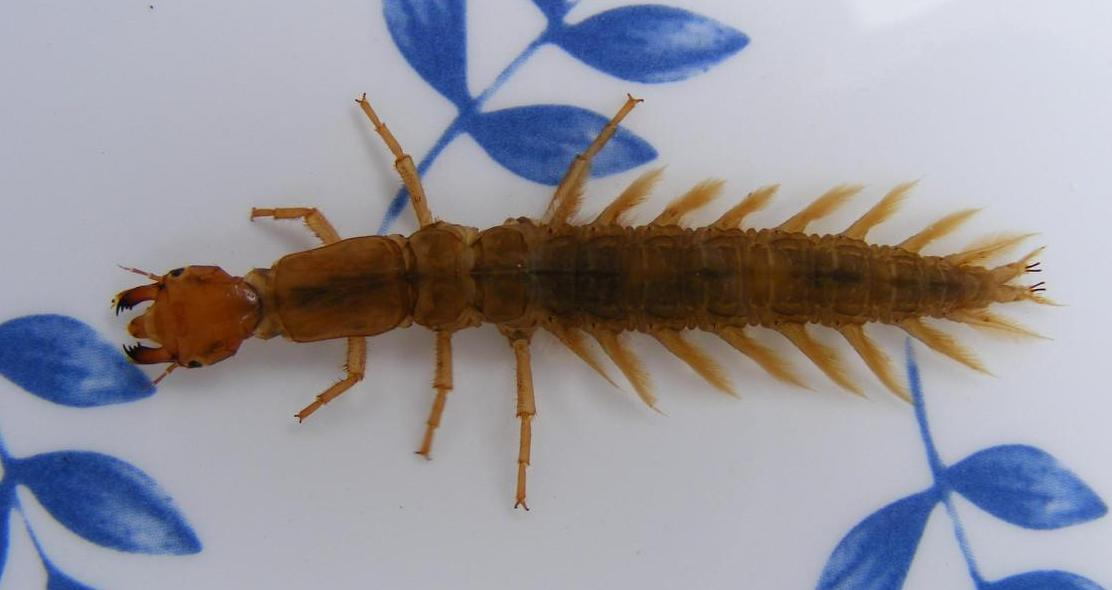
Aquatic larvae

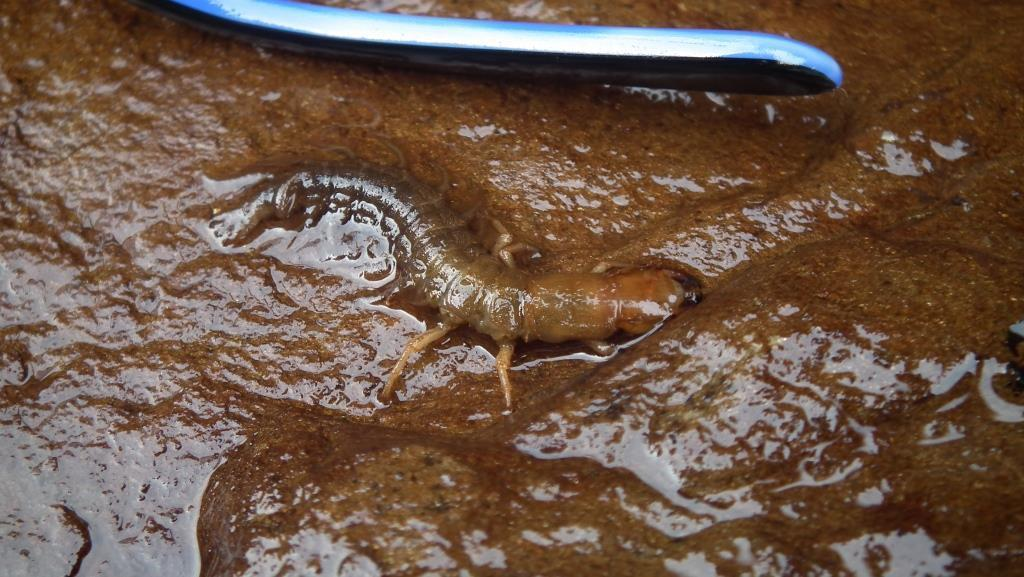

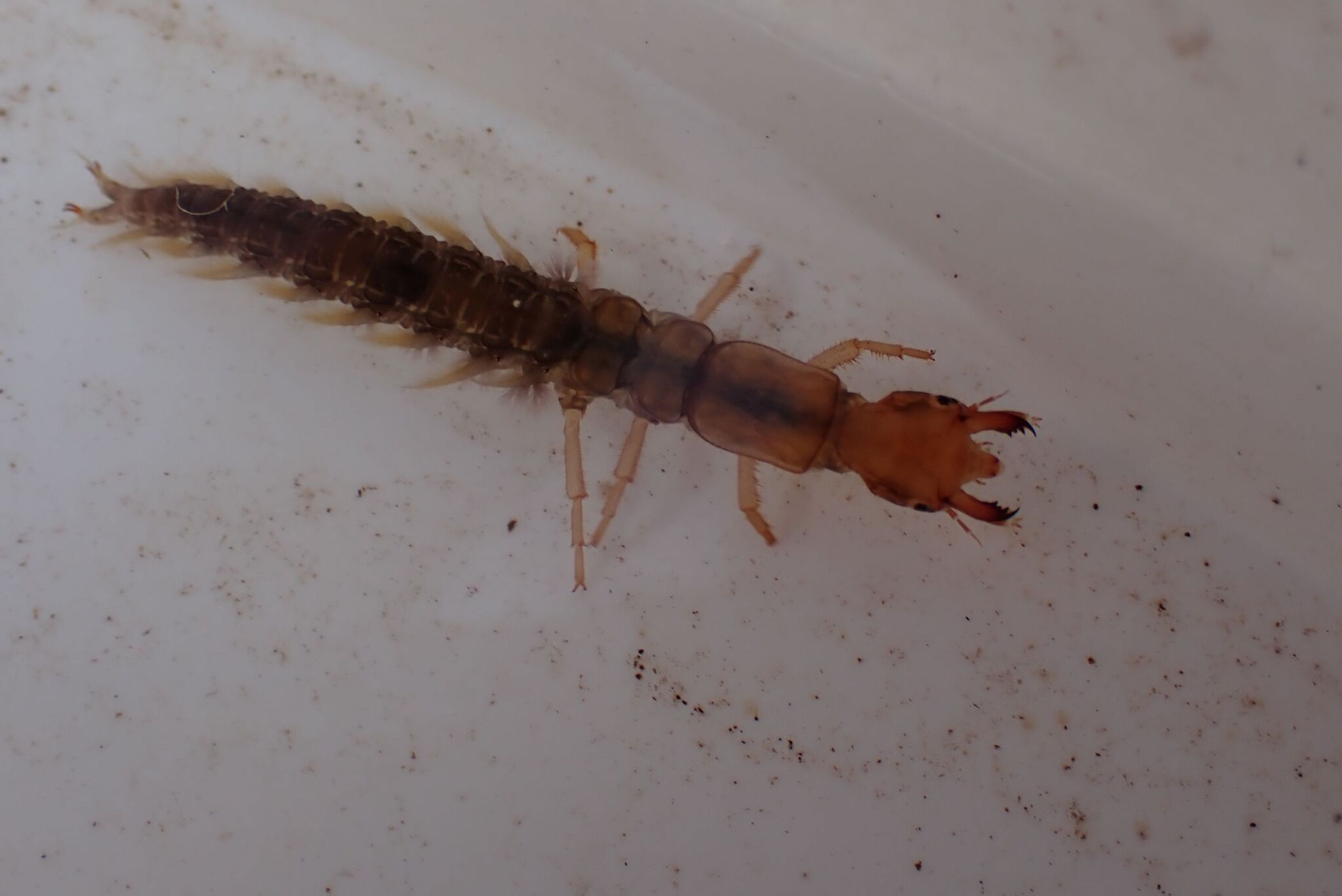
