= Chloronia convergens =

Scientific classification
- Kingdom: Animalia
- Phylum: Arthropoda
- Clade: Pancrustacea
- Class: Insecta
- Order: Megaloptera
- Family: Corydalidae
- Genus: Chloronia
- Species: C. convergens

Binomial name
- Chloronia convergens Contreras-Ramos, 1995

Species of dobsonfly

Chloronia convergens is a species of dobsonfly found in Ecuador.

== Description ==
This species is most similar to the more widespread Chloronia mirifica. Chloronia convergens differs by having a dark spot in the first anal cell of the forewing. It also differs significantly in the structure of the male genitalia.

== Etymology ==
The specific epithet "convergens" is derived from the fact that the spines on the sternite lobes (a certain structure in the male genitalia) are pointing towards the midline (mesally), which readily distinguish this species.
