= Chloronia zacapa =

Scientific classification
- Kingdom: Animalia
- Phylum: Arthropoda
- Clade: Pancrustacea
- Class: Insecta
- Order: Megaloptera
- Family: Corydalidae
- Genus: Chloronia
- Species: C. zacapa

Binomial name
- Chloronia zacapa Contreras-Ramos, 1995

Species of insect

Chloronia zacapa is a species of dobsonfly found in Guatemala, Honduras, and Nicaragua.

== Description ==
This species is most similar to Chloronia absona, however Chloronia zacapa has a dark spot in the R cell, which is not present in Chloronia absona. The tenth tergites, which in this group appear like long projections that have evolved to be a part of the male genitalia, are almost L-shaped, while those of Chloronia absona are only moderately bent.

== Etymology ==
The specific epithet "zacapa" is the same as the province Zacapa where the type specimens were collected. It is most likely of Nahuatl origin and approximately means "on the river of grass".
