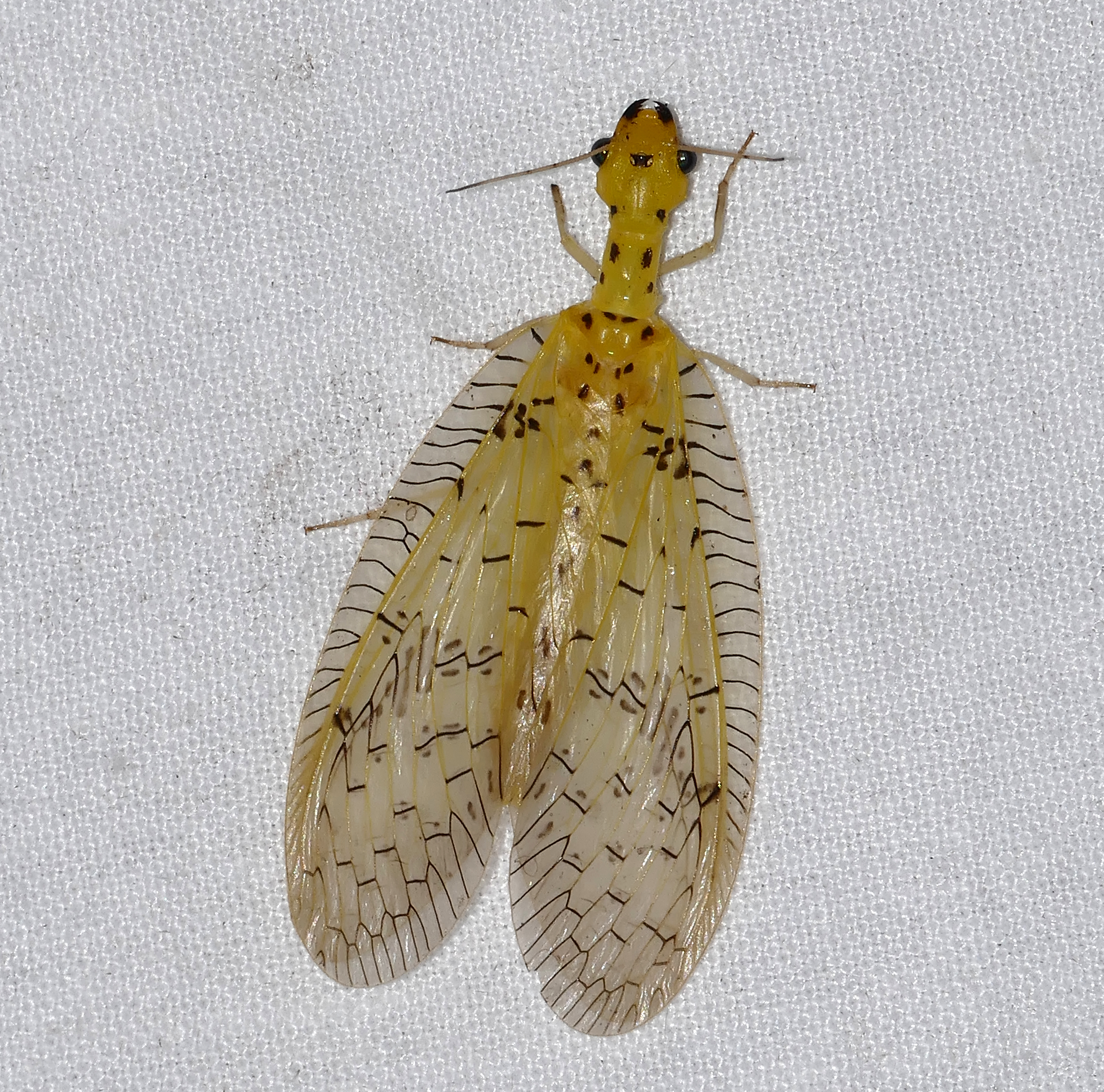

Scientific classification
- Kingdom: Animalia
- Phylum: Arthropoda
- Clade: Pancrustacea
- Class: Insecta
- Order: Megaloptera
- Family: Corydalidae
- Genus: Chloronia
- Species: C. hieroglyphica

Binomial name
- Chloronia hieroglyphica (Rambur, 1842)

Synonyms
- List: Nevromus hieroglyphicus Rambur, 1842; Hermes hieroglyphicus (Rambur, 1842); Corydalus hieroglyphicus (Rambur, 1842); Nevromus (Chloronia) hieroglyphicus (Rambur, 1842); Corydalis hieroglyphica (Rambur, 1842)

= Chloronia hieroglyphica =

Species of insect

Chloronia hieroglyphica is a species of dobsonfly found in Brazil, French Guiana, Guyana, Peru, Venezuela and possibly Argentina and Panama.

== Description ==
This species resembles other members of the C. hieroglyphica species group C. bogotana and C. banksiana. All three have a primitive 10th tergite and 9th sternum, but C. hieroglyphica has a more specialized, shouldered 10th gonostylus and an attenuate ninth gonostylus. The length of the male forewing is 29–40 mm and the length of the female forewing is 25–42 mm.

The larvae of dobsonflies are rarely described, but the larvae of C. hieroglyphica are among the few that has a fully described larval stage.
