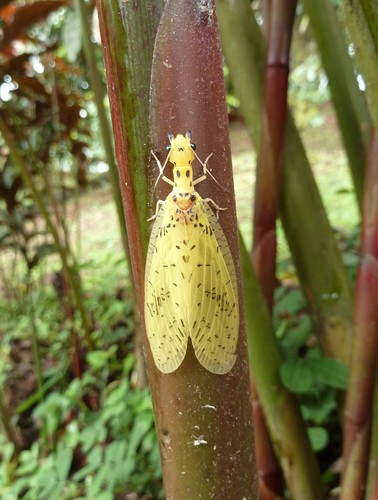
- Adult Chloronia osae from Las Cruces Biological Station, Costa Rica

Scientific classification
- Kingdom: Animalia
- Phylum: Arthropoda
- Clade: Pancrustacea
- Class: Insecta
- Order: Megaloptera
- Family: Corydalidae
- Subfamily: Corydalinae
- Genus: Chloronia; Banks, 1908

Type species
- Hermes corripiens Walker, 1860

= Chloronia =

Genus of dobsonfly

Chloronia is a genus of dobsonflies in the family Corydalidae.

== Description ==
Chloronia is one of the three New World dobsonfly genera, the other two being Platyneuromus and Corydalus. Chloronia are easily distinguished by their bright yellow coloration with black spots and are present from Northern Mexico south to Eastern South America. Chloronia frequently inhabit the same streams as Corydalus but prefer slower moving waters. Their larvae are distinguishable by their dark head and four dark spots on their pronotum.

== Ecology ==
Species in the genus are attracted to light, especially UV light and most museum specimens have been caught using this method. They are found near running water, but they do not seem to have a preference for width of the river, as they have been found by rivers of 1–20 meters, though there may be more specific preferences for certain species such as possibly Chloronia hieroglyphica. The larvae are predatory as in other Megaloptera and are hypothesized to feed on larvae in the genus Simulium.

== Taxonomy ==
Chloronia contains the following 18 species as of 2026:

- Chloronia absona Flint, 1992
- Chloronia antilliensis Flint, 1970
- Chloronia banksiana Penny & Flint, 1982
- Chloronia bogotana van der Weele, 1909
- Chloronia convergens Contreras-Ramos, 1995
- Chloronia corripiens (Walker, 1860)
- Chloronia gaianii Contreras-Ramos, 2002
- Chloronia gloriosoi Penny & Flint, 1982
- Chloronia hieroglyphica (Rambur, 1842)
- Chloronia marthae Contreras-Ramos, 2002
- Chloronia mexicana Stitz, 1914
- Chloronia mirifica Navás, 1925
- Chloronia osae Flint, 1992
- Chloronia pallida (Davis, 1903)
- Chloronia pennyi Contreras-Ramos, 2000
- Chloronia plaumanni Penny & Flint, 1982
- Chloronia yungas Contreras-Ramos, 2006
- Chloronia zacapa Contreras-Ramos, 1995

== Phylogeny ==
A 2025 study made the following phylogeny using molecular techniques:

- Corydalinae
  - Chloroniella
  - - Protohermes
    - - - Acanthacorydalis
        - - Platyneuromus
          - - Chloronia
            - Corydalus
      - - Nevromus
        - Neoneuromus
