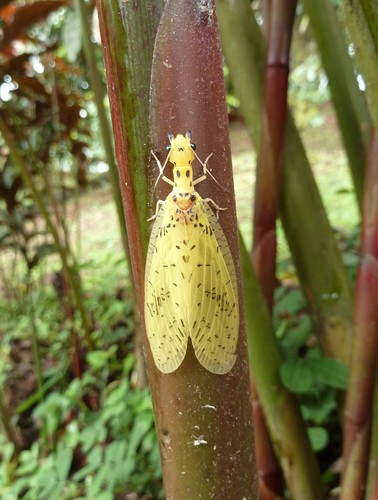

Scientific classification
- Kingdom: Animalia
- Phylum: Arthropoda
- Clade: Pancrustacea
- Class: Insecta
- Order: Megaloptera
- Family: Corydalidae
- Genus: Chloronia
- Species: C. osae

Binomial name
- Chloronia osae Flint, 1992

= Chloronia osae =

Species of insect

Chloronia osae is a species of dobsonfly endemic to Costa Rica.

== Description ==
The length of the male forewing is 31-32 mm. The male genitalia are quite close to those of Chloronia antilliensis. They can be distinguished by the presence of three pairs of tufts of spinous setae dorsally in Chloronia osae, as there is only one of these present in Chloronia antilliensis.
