= Chloronia pallida =

Scientific classification
- Kingdom: Animalia
- Phylum: Arthropoda
- Clade: Pancrustacea
- Class: Insecta
- Order: Megaloptera
- Family: Corydalidae
- Genus: Chloronia
- Species: C. pallida

Binomial name
- Chloronia pallida (Davis, 1903)

Synonyms
- Nevromus pallidus Davis, 1903; Corydalis cornuta f. pallida (Davis, 1903); Corydalus pallidus (Davis, 1903)

Species of insect

Chloronia pallida is a species of dobsonfly endemic to Mexico.

== Description ==
Chloronia pallida most closely resembles C. mexicana which is also its closest relative. The genitalia don't differ much except for the 10th gonostyli being a little shorter in Chloronia pallida. The best way to distinguish between the two is that C. mexicana has antennae that are infuscate in the apical two-thirds, while the antennae of C. pallida are completely pale. The length of the male forewing is 29 mm.

== Biology ==
This species is endemic to Mexico and prefers moderate to high temperatures with moderate rainfall. It is associated with the following three hydro-ecoregions (WWF ID-number is also given): Chiapas - Fonseca (201), Sierra Madre del Sur (170), and Rio Balsas (169).
