= Chloronia plaumanni =

Scientific classification
- Kingdom: Animalia
- Phylum: Arthropoda
- Clade: Pancrustacea
- Class: Insecta
- Order: Megaloptera
- Family: Corydalidae
- Genus: Chloronia
- Species: C. plaumanni

Binomial name
- Chloronia plaumanni Penny & Flint, 1982

Species of insect

Chloronia plaumanni is a species of dobsonfly found in southern Brazil.

== Description ==
This species forms a characteristic species group alongside Chloronia corripiens that occur in southern Brazil. The dark stripe starting at the posterior end of the eye and continuing posteriorly combined with the extra pair of dark spots on the pronotum are diagnostic for Chloronia plaumanni.

== Etymology ==
The specific epithet "plaumanni" is a latinized masculine genitive of the name of the collector Mr. Fritz Plaumann. It is a tribute to honor what the authors call great strides in bringing the entomofauna of the state of Santa Catarina to the attention of specialists.
