= Chloronia gaianii =

Scientific classification
- Kingdom: Animalia
- Phylum: Arthropoda
- Clade: Pancrustacea
- Class: Insecta
- Order: Megaloptera
- Family: Corydalidae
- Genus: Chloronia
- Species: C. gaianii

Binomial name
- Chloronia gaianii Contreras-Ramos, 2002

Species of insect

Chloronia gaianii is a species of dobsonfly that is endemic to Venezuela as of 2022.

== Description ==
This species is most similar to C. hieroglyphica. C. gaianii is generally larger in both sexes and has four posterolateral spots on the head arranged behind the eye and in front of the pronotum, which is similar to C. bogotana, a member of the C. hieroglyphica species group and C. pennyi. The tenth sternite lobes of the male genitalia of C. gaianii are directed mesally with sclerotized tips, which is characteristic for the species. They are not sclerotized in C. hieroglyphica.

== Etymology ==
The specific epithet "gaianii" is a tribute to Marco A. Gaiani of MIZA, who hosted the author of this species during his trip to Venezuela. The author described him as an enthusiast of Venezualan insect diversity.
