= Chloronia gloriosoi =

Scientific classification
- Kingdom: Animalia
- Phylum: Arthropoda
- Clade: Pancrustacea
- Class: Insecta
- Order: Megaloptera
- Family: Corydalidae
- Genus: Chloronia
- Species: C. gloriosoi

Binomial name
- Chloronia gloriosoi Penny & Flint, 1982

Species of dobsonfly

Chloronia gloriosoi is a species of dobsonfly found in Colombia, Costa Rica, Nicaragua, and Panama.

== Description ==
This species is most similar to C. mexicana, which is likely the closest relative. They both have three sets of spinous setae on the ninth and tenth tergite and also the bilobate ninth sternites. It is also quite similar to C. mirifica because of the simple and elongate 10th tergites. The The length of the forewing in the male is 39–45 mm and 42–44 mm in the female. It does not seem to vary much in color or size.

== Biology ==
It was originally found in Fortuna in northern Panama, which is a wet forested place located 1050 m a.s.l. on the western slope of the Cordillera Central, a part of the Andes Mountains. Fortuna is usually not particularly seasonal, but despite this, the adults of Chloronia gloriosoi are only found from April to July.

== Etymology ==
The specific epithet is a tribute to Mr. Michael J. Glorioso whom the authors described as "a most promising student of Megaloptera". He died suddenly in 1980, two years prior to the description of this species.
