= Corydalites =

Corydalites Temporal range: Late Cretaceous

Scientific classification
- Kingdom: Animalia
- Phylum: Arthropoda
- Clade: Pancrustacea
- Class: Insecta
- Order: Megaloptera
- Family: Corydalidae
- Genus: †Corydalites; Scudder, 1878
- Species: †C. fecundum

Binomial name
- †Corydalites fecundum Scudder, 1878

Extinct dobsonfly genus from the late cretaceous

Corydalites is an extinct monotypic genus of dobsonfly containing the single species Corydalites fecundum. Fossils have been found in both the US and France.
