= Chloronia antilliensis =

Scientific classification
- Kingdom: Animalia
- Phylum: Arthropoda
- Clade: Pancrustacea
- Class: Insecta
- Order: Megaloptera
- Family: Corydalidae
- Genus: Chloronia
- Species: C. antilliensis

Binomial name
- Chloronia antilliensis Flint, 1970

Species of insect

Chloronia antilliensis is a species of dobsonfly found in Dominica and Guadeloupe.

== Description ==
The length of the forewing is 28–34 mm (male) and 31–43 mm (female). This species is most similar to C. corripiens.
