= Chloronia banksiana =

Scientific classification
- Kingdom: Animalia
- Phylum: Arthropoda
- Clade: Pancrustacea
- Class: Insecta
- Order: Megaloptera
- Family: Corydalidae
- Genus: Chloronia
- Species: C. banksiana

Binomial name
- Chloronia banksiana Penny & Flint, 1982

Species of insect

Chloronia banksiana is a species of dobsonfly found in Venezuela.

== Description ==
Chloronia banksiana is in the hieroglyphica group and is most similar to Chloronia bogotana. Chloronia banksiana is distinguished by having a rugose head and more distinctly marked forewings of intense yellow color. The length of the forewings are 32–33 mm (male) and 35–38 mm (female).

== Etymology ==
The specific epithet "banksiana" is a tribute to Mr. Nathan Banks for his contributions to the study of Neuroptera (neuropterology).
