= Chloronia absona =

Scientific classification
- Kingdom: Animalia
- Phylum: Arthropoda
- Clade: Pancrustacea
- Class: Insecta
- Order: Megaloptera
- Family: Corydalidae
- Genus: Chloronia
- Species: C. absona

Binomial name
- Chloronia absona Flint, 1992

Species of insect

Chloronia absona is a species of dobsonfly endemic to Costa Rica.

== Description ==
The length of the forewing is 41–44 mm (male) and 40–48 mm (female). They are yellow with dark spots. The male genitalia are the most highly modified in the genus.
