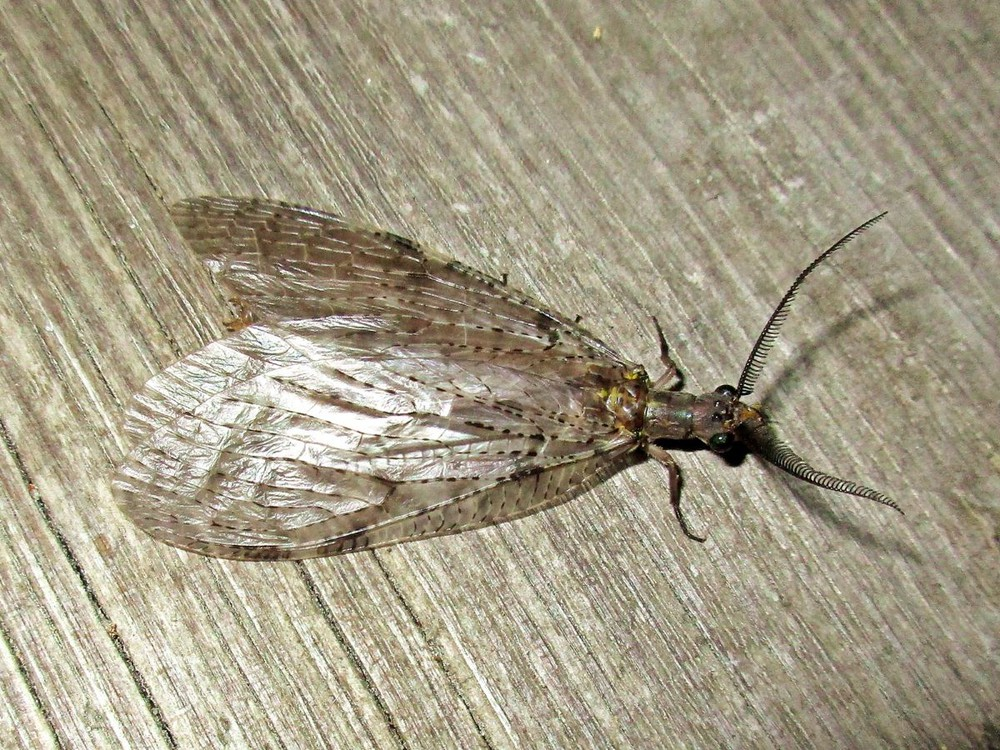

Scientific classification
- Kingdom: Animalia
- Phylum: Arthropoda
- Class: Insecta
- Order: Megaloptera
- Family: Corydalidae
- Genus: Chauliodes
- Species: C. pectinicornis

Binomial name
- Chauliodes pectinicornis (Linnaeus, 1763)

Synonyms
- Hemerobius pectinicornis Linnaeus, 1763; Hemerobius virginiensis Drury, 1773

= Chauliodes pectinicornis =

Species of insect

Chauliodes pectinicornis known as Summer fishfly, is a species of fishfly from North America.

== Distribution ==
C. pectinicornis has a wide distribution in eastern Canada and the United States, from Maine in the north-east to Alachua, Liberty and Santa Rosa counties in Florida to the south-east, and as far west as Kansas.

== Taxonomic history ==
C. pectinicornis was first described by Carl Linnaeus in his 1763 work Centuria Insectorum.

Synonyms: Linnaeus 1763

Hemerobius pectinicornis, Hemerobius virginiensis, Semblis pectinicornis, Chauliodes virginiensis.

== Ecology ==
C. pectinicornis has a commensal relationship with Plecopteracoluthus downesi larvae, which undergo their entire life cycle including pupation on the fishfly's mesothorax.
