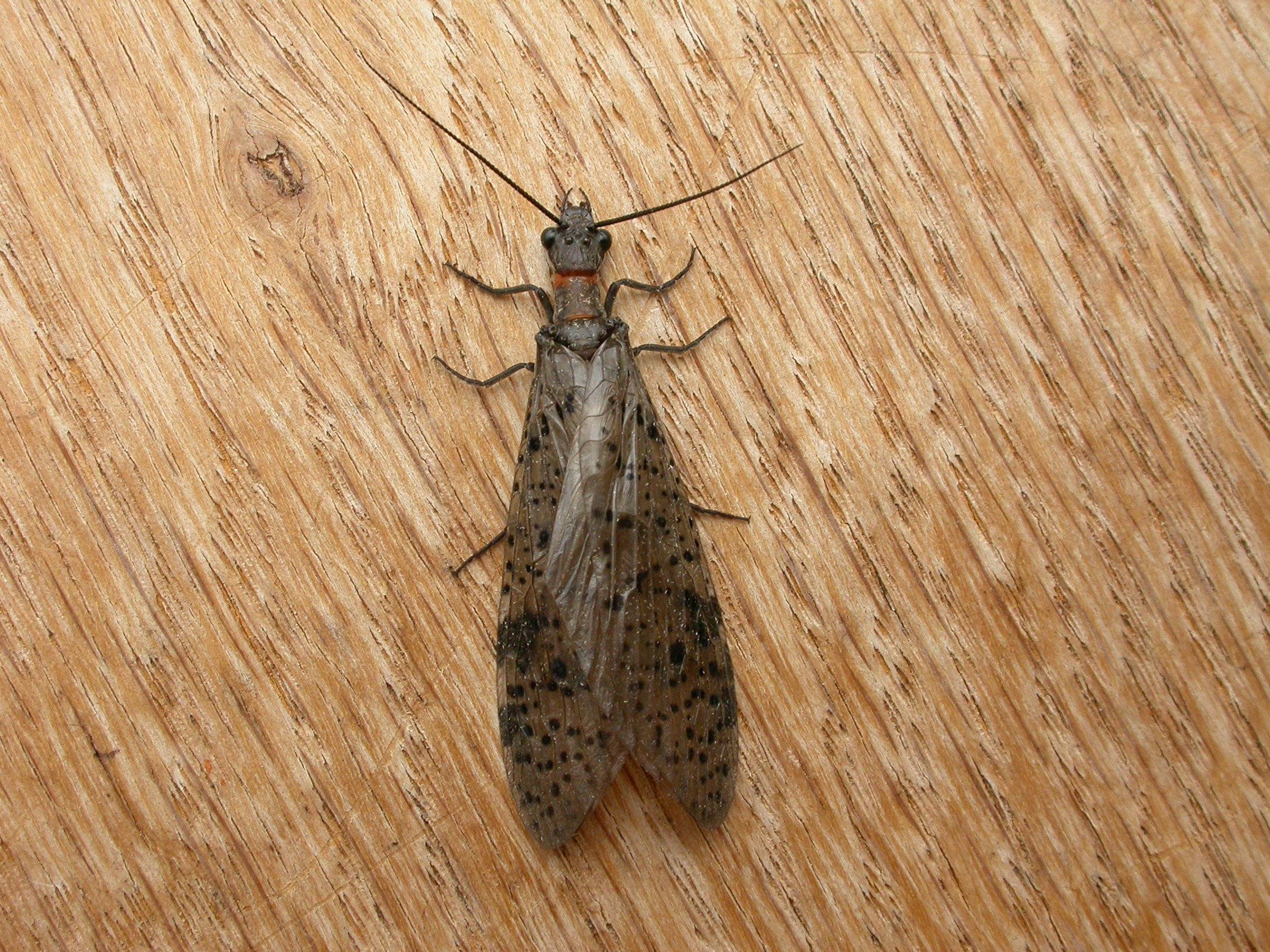
- Archichauliodes

Scientific classification
- Domain: Eukaryota
- Kingdom: Animalia
- Phylum: Arthropoda
- Class: Insecta
- Order: Megaloptera
- Family: Corydalidae
- Subfamily: Chauliodinae
- Genus: Archichauliodes; Weele, 1909

= Archichauliodes =

Genus of insects

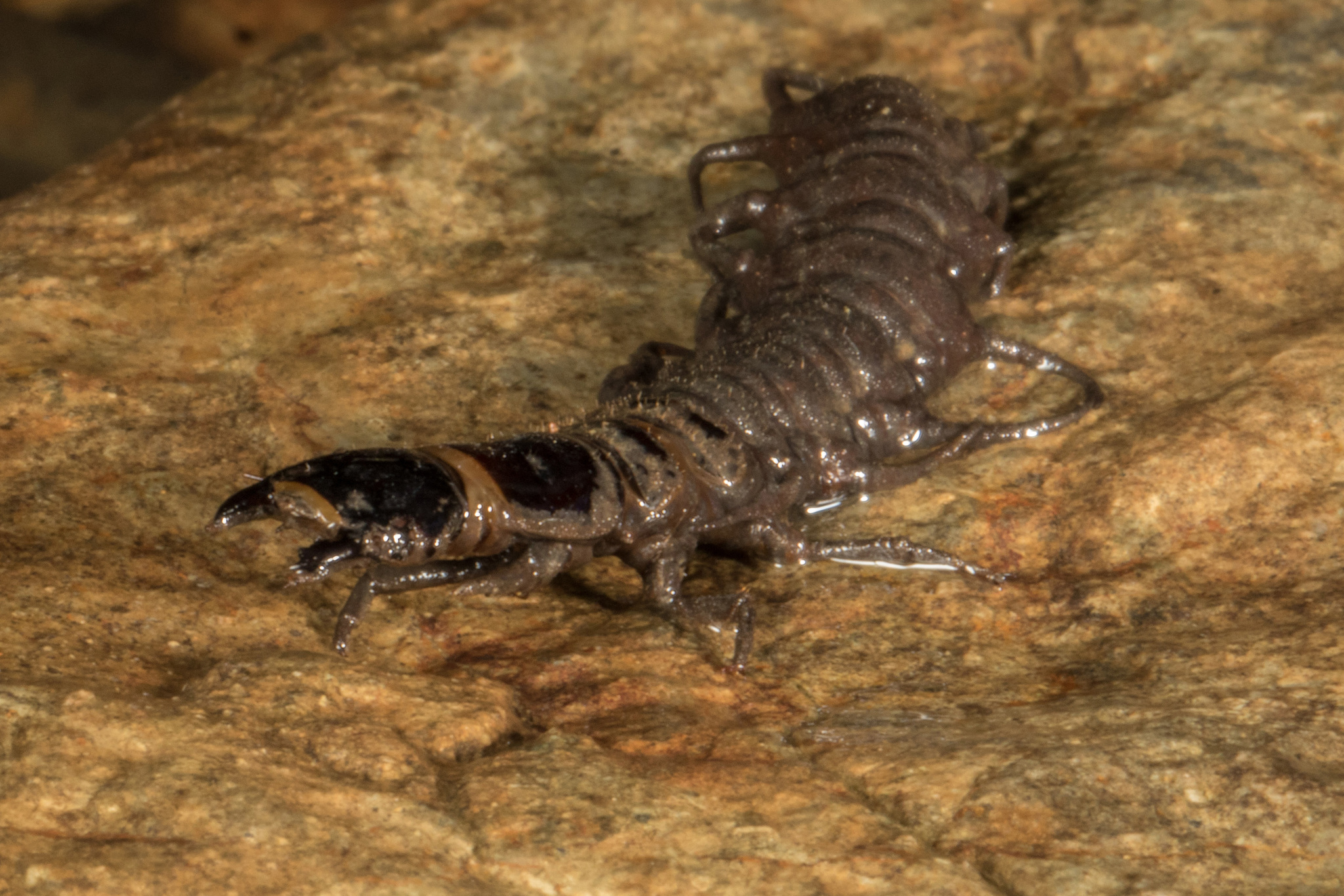
Archichauliodes diversus

Archichauliodes is a genus of fishflies in the family Corydalidae. There are more than 20 described species in Archichauliodes.

== Species ==
These 21 species belong to the genus Archichauliodes:

- Archichauliodes anagaurus Riek, 1954
- Archichauliodes chilensis Kimmins, 1954
- Archichauliodes collifer Theischinger, 1983
- Archichauliodes conversus Theischinger, 1983
- Archichauliodes cuspidatus Theischinger, 1983
- Archichauliodes deceptor Kimmins, 1954
- Archichauliodes diversus (Walker, 1853)
- Archichauliodes glossa Theischinger, 1988
- Archichauliodes guttiferus (Walker, 1853)
- Archichauliodes isolatus Theischinger, 1983
- Archichauliodes lewis Theischinger, 1983
- Archichauliodes neoguttiferus Theischinger, 1983
- Archichauliodes phaeoscius Riek, 1954
- Archichauliodes pictus Theischinger, 1983
- Archichauliodes pinares Flint, 1973
- Archichauliodes piscator Theischinger, 1983
- Archichauliodes plomleyi Kimmins, 1954
- Archichauliodes polypastus Riek, 1954
- Archichauliodes rieki Theischinger, 1983
- Archichauliodes simpsoni Theischinger, 1983
- Archichauliodes uncinatus Theischinger, 1983
