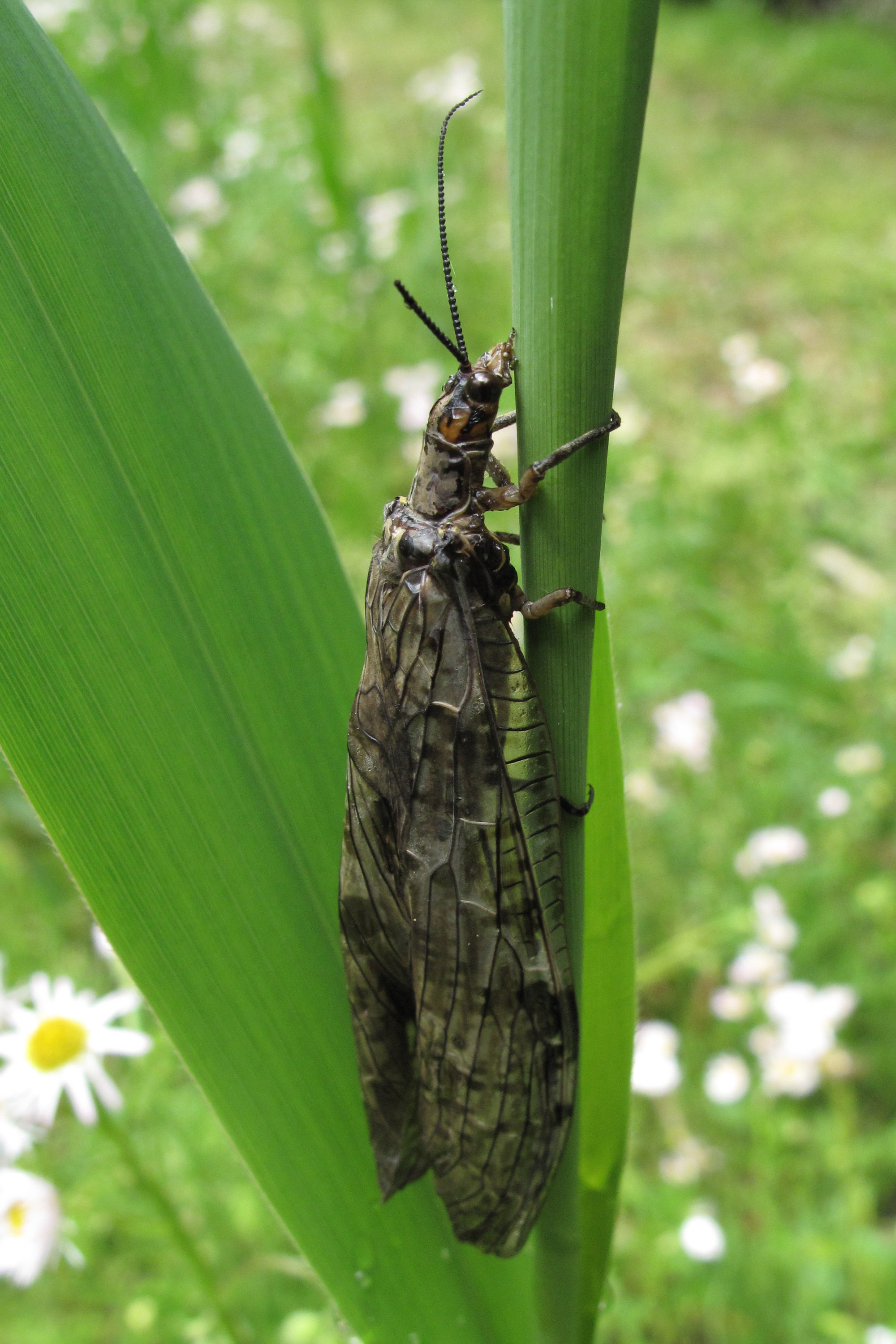
- Adult Parachauliodes continentalis

Scientific classification
- Kingdom: Animalia
- Phylum: Arthropoda
- Clade: Pancrustacea
- Class: Insecta
- Order: Megaloptera
- Family: Corydalidae
- Subfamily: Chauliodinae
- Genus: Parachauliodes; Van der Weele, 1909

= Parachauliodes =

Genus of insects

Parachauliodes is a genus of fishfly in the family Corydalidae. Its species are found throughout Eastern Asia and likely originated on the Korean Peninsula before dispersing to the Japanese Archipelago 15 million years ago.

== Description ==
Parachauliodes are differentiated from other genera of fishflies by the presence of bi-lobed ectoproct in males and usually having serrated antenna in both sexes. The former genus Sinochauliodes was found to be a synonym of Parachauliodes.

Larvae have a pair of respiratory tubes on their dorsal side to enable aerial respiration in poorly oxygenated water. Larvae climb out of the water during the night following rain, and P. continentalis dig a bowl-like pit as a pupal chamber. In some species, males mature faster and leave the water earlier to ensure greater mating success. Male Parachauliodes produce a gelatinous spermatophore with spherical bundles of sperm. The volume of the spermatophore ranges within the genus being large enough to prevent remating by females in P. japonicus white being smaller and decreasing in size more slowly in P. continentalis. Adult Megaloptera have been described as dispelling meconial fluids from their anus as a potential defense mechanism, and Parachauliodes produce a much larger volume than other genera.

== Taxonomy ==
Parachauliodes contains the following species:

- P. asahinai X.-y. Liu et al., 2008
- P. buchi Navás, 1924
- P. continentalis van der Weele, 1909
- P. inopinatus Shimonoya, 2015
- P. japonicus (McLachlan, 1867)
- P. nebulosus (Okamoto, 1910)
- P. niger X.-y. Liu et al., 2008
- P. yanbaru Asahina, 1987
