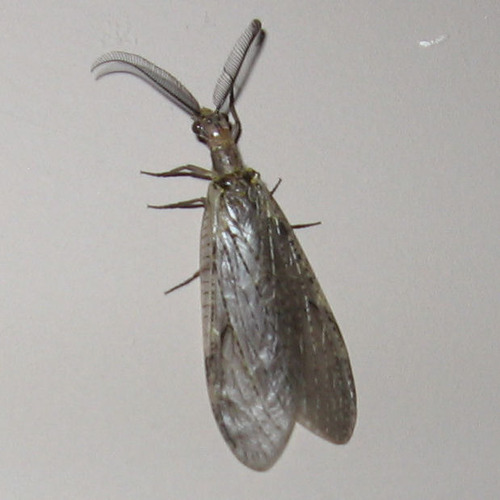
- Male fishfly (Chauliodinae sp).

Scientific classification
- Kingdom: Animalia
- Phylum: Arthropoda
- Clade: Pancrustacea
- Class: Insecta
- Order: Megaloptera
- Family: Corydalidae
- Subfamily: Chauliodinae; Davis, 1903

Genera
- See text

= Chauliodinae =

Chauliodinae Temporal range: Middle Jurassic–Recent

Subfamily of insects

Fishflies are members of the subfamily Chauliodinae, belonging to the megalopteran family Corydalidae. They are most easily distinguished from their closest relatives, dobsonflies, by the jaws (mandibles) and antennae. In contrast to the large jaws (especially in males) of dobsonflies, fishfly mandibles are not particularly noticeable or distinctive, and the males have feathery antennae similar to many large moths. Chauliodes pectinicornis, the "summer fishfly", is a well-known species in North America.

Fishflies lay their eggs upon vegetation overhanging streams, whence the larvae, as soon as hatched, drop into the water, and go about preying upon aquatic animals. When ready to transform to pupae, they crawl out upon the bank and are then found in cavities under stones or even under the bark of trees.

Fishflies are quite large, with a wingspan of 2.5 to 3 inches (6 to 8 cm). Certain omnivorous larvae will eat aquatic plants as well as animal material, while others are predatory, consuming small animals including vertebrates like minnows and tadpoles. They may live up to around seven days as largely non-feeding adults. Their entire lifespan is several years, but most of this time is spent as larvae.

There are about 15 genera with nearly 110 species. The New World genera include Dysmicohermes, Orohermes, Neohermes, Nothochauliodes, Protochauliodes, Archichauliodes, Chauliodes and Nigronia. Three genera are endemic to the Afrotropical Realm and are found in Madagascar and South Africa - Platychauliodes, Madachauliodes and Taeniochauliodes. Archichauliodes and Protochauli-odes found in the Australian Realm. The genera endemic to the Oriental Realm are Anachauliodes, Ctenochauliodes, Neochauliodes and Parachauliodes.

== Genera ==
The following genera are included as of 2022:

- Anachauliodes Kimmins, 1954
- Apochauliodes Theischinger, 1983
- Archichauliodes van der Weele, 1909
- Chauliodes Latreille, 1796
- †Cretochaulus Ponomarenko, 1976
- Ctenochauliodes van der Weele, 1909
- Dysmicohermes Munroe, 1953
- †Eochauliodes Liu et al., 2012
- †Jurochauliodes Wang & Zhang, 2010
- Madachauliodes Paulian, 1951
- Neochauliodes van der Weele, 1909
- Neohermes Banks, 1908
- Nigronia Banks, 1908
- Nothochauliodes Flint, 1983
- Orohermes Evans, 1984
- Parachauliodes van der Weele, 1909
- Platychauliodes Esben-Petersen, 1924
- Protochauliodes van der Weele, 1909
- Puri Cardoso-Costa et al., 2013
- Taeniochauliodes Esben-Petersen, 1924
