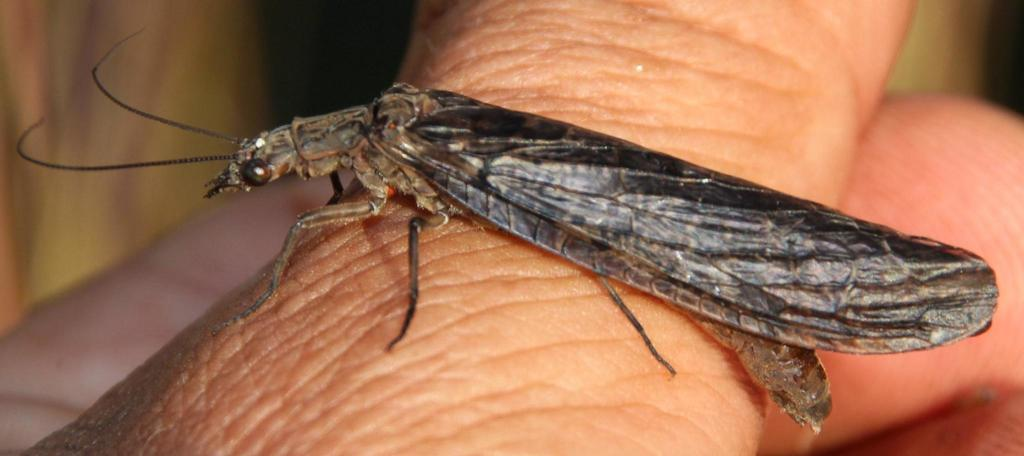
- Taeniochauliodes from Cedarberg Wilderness Area, South Africa

Scientific classification
- Kingdom: Animalia
- Phylum: Arthropoda
- Class: Insecta
- Order: Megaloptera
- Family: Corydalidae
- Subfamily: Chauliodinae
- Genus: Taeniochauliodes; Esben-Petersen, 1924

= Taeniochauliodes =

Genus of fishflies

Taeniochauliodes is a genus of fishflies in the family Corydalidae.

== Description ==
Taeniochauliodes is the most common genus of fishfly in South Africa. It is distinguishable from Platychauliodes and Madachauliodes by the fusion of two of the longitudinal anal veins in the forewing as well as large ocelli.

Taeniochauliodes forms a clade with Protochauliodes and Neohermes, together distributed across Australia, North America, and the nearctic.

== Taxonomy ==
Taeniochauliodes contains the following species:

- Taeniochauliodes barnardi
- Taeniochauliodes angustus
- Taeniochauliodes esbenpeterseni
- Taeniochauliodes natalensis
- Taeniochauliodes fuscus
- Taeniochauliodes minutus
- Taeniochauliodes ochraceopennis
- Taeniochauliodes attenuatus
