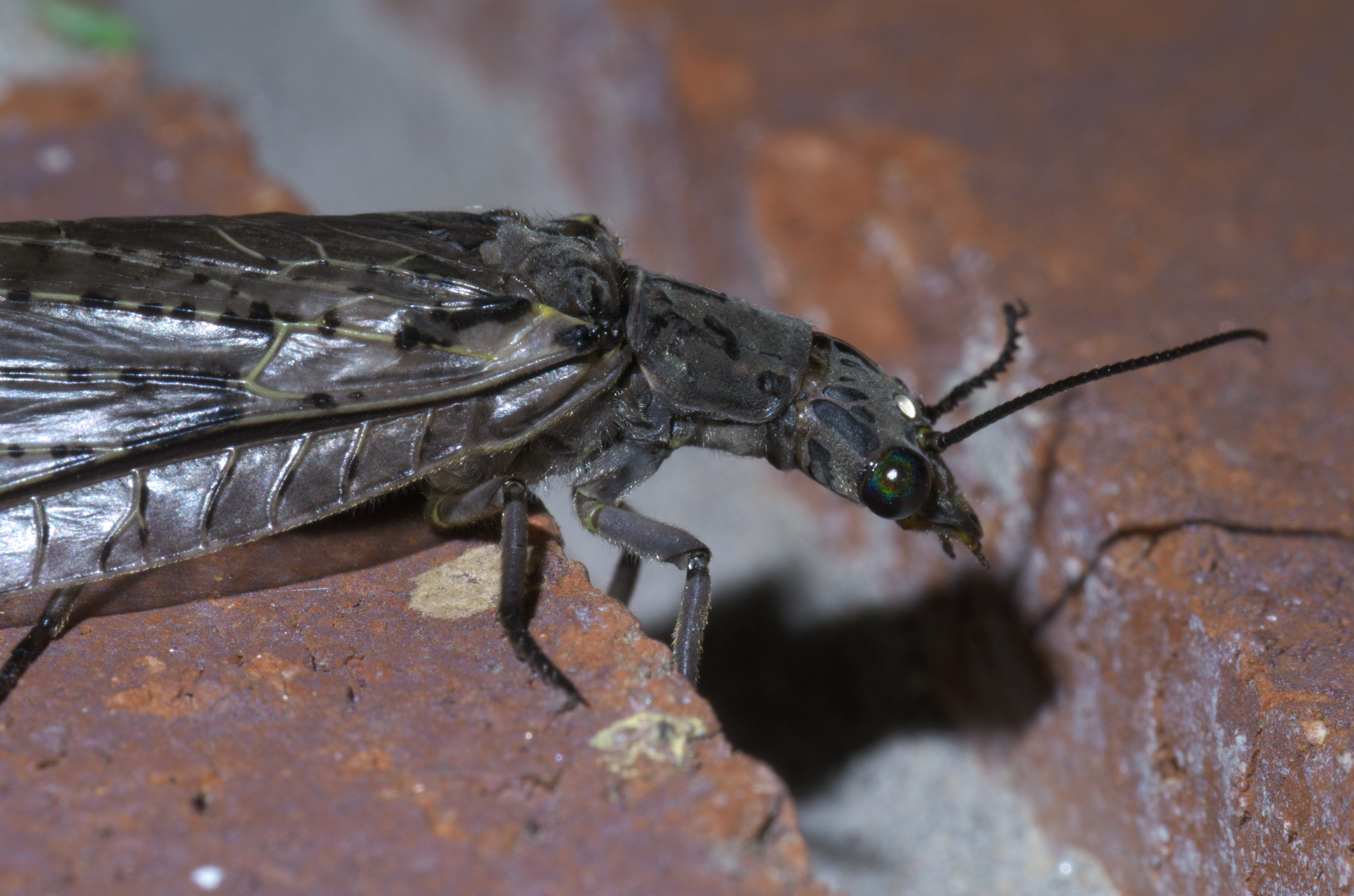
- Chauliodes pectinicornis

Scientific classification
- Kingdom: Animalia
- Phylum: Arthropoda
- Class: Insecta
- Order: Megaloptera
- Family: Corydalidae
- Subfamily: Chauliodinae
- Genus: Chauliodes; Latreille, 1796

= Chauliodes =

Genus of insects

Chauliodes is a genus of fishflies in the family Corydalidae. There are about five described species in Chauliodes.

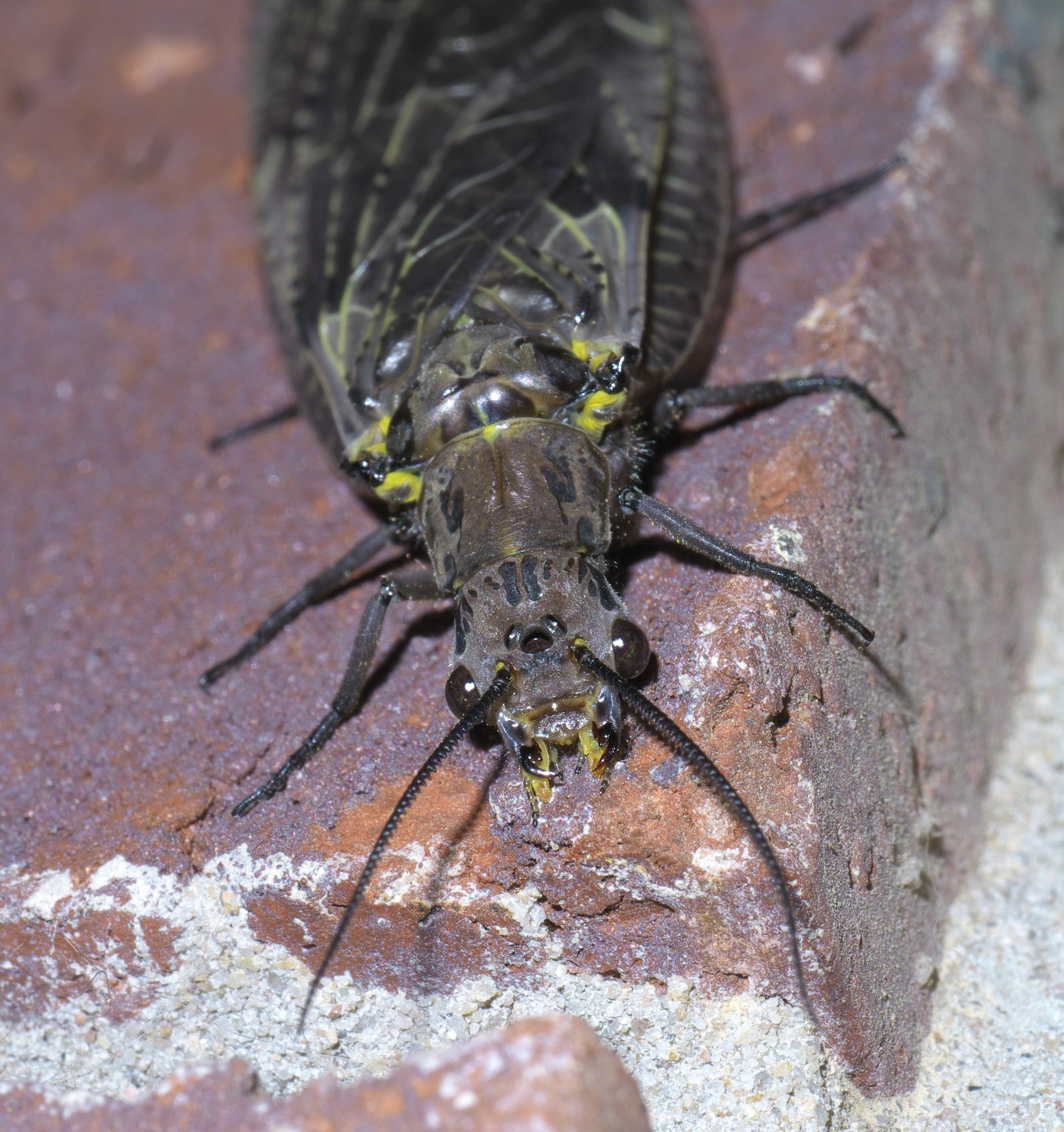
Chauliodes rastricornis

== Species ==
These five species belong to the genus Chauliodes:

- Chauliodes carsteni Wichard, 2003
- Chauliodes pectinicornis (Linnaeus, 1763) – summer fishfly
- Chauliodes priscus Pictet, 1856
- Chauliodes rastricornis Rambur, 1842 – spring fishfly
- Chauliodes schneideri Risso, 1827
