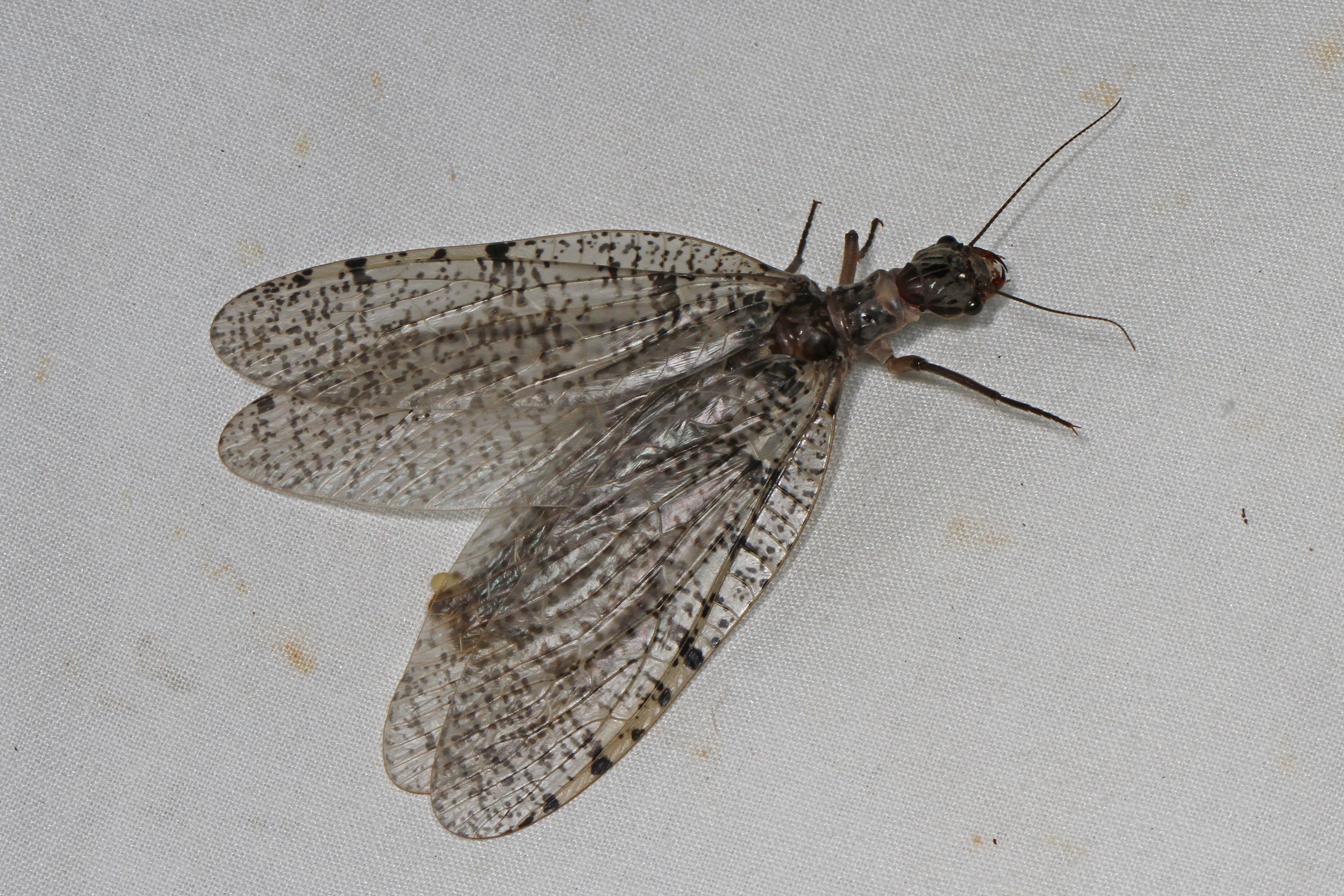
- Orohermes crepusculus

Scientific classification
- Domain: Eukaryota
- Kingdom: Animalia
- Phylum: Arthropoda
- Class: Insecta
- Order: Megaloptera
- Family: Corydalidae
- Genus: Orohermes; Evans, 1984
- Species: O. crepusculus

Binomial name
- Orohermes crepusculus (Chandler, 1954)

= Orohermes =

Genus of insects

Orohermes is a genus of fishflies in the family Corydalidae. There is one described species in Orohermes, O. crepusculus.

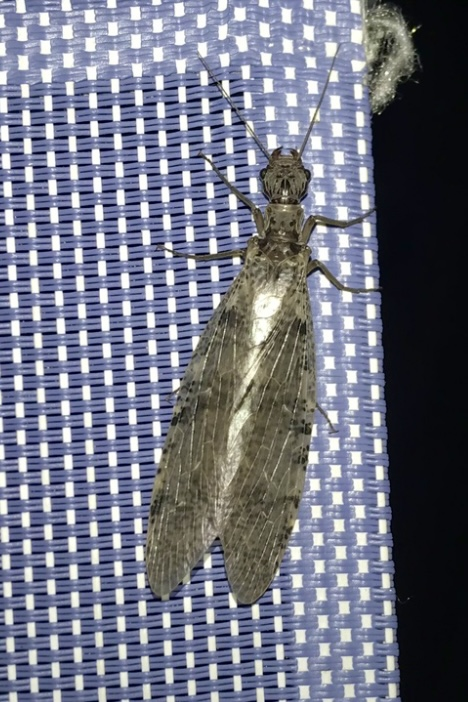
Orohermes crepusculus, a kind of fishfly
