= Chloronia corripiens =

Scientific classification
- Kingdom: Animalia
- Phylum: Arthropoda
- Clade: Pancrustacea
- Class: Insecta
- Order: Megaloptera
- Family: Corydalidae
- Genus: Chloronia
- Species: C. corripiens

Binomial name
- Chloronia corripiens (Walker, 1860)

Synonyms
- List: Hermes corripiens Walker, 1858; Neuromus corripiens McLachlan, 1869; Chloronia corripiens Banks, 1908; Corydalis affinis Hagen,1861; Neuromus winthemi Davis, 1903; Chloronia winthemi Weele 1910; Chloronia meridionalis Weele, 1909; Chloronia ocellaris Navás, 1934

Species of insect

Chloronia corripiens is a species of dobsonfly found in Brazil.

== Description ==
Chloronia corripiens is keyed out on the following two characteristics in the key provided in Penny & Flint, 1982:

- Head unicolorous or with lateral margin infuscate
- Lateral margin unmarked

They also provide a complete redescription of the species.
