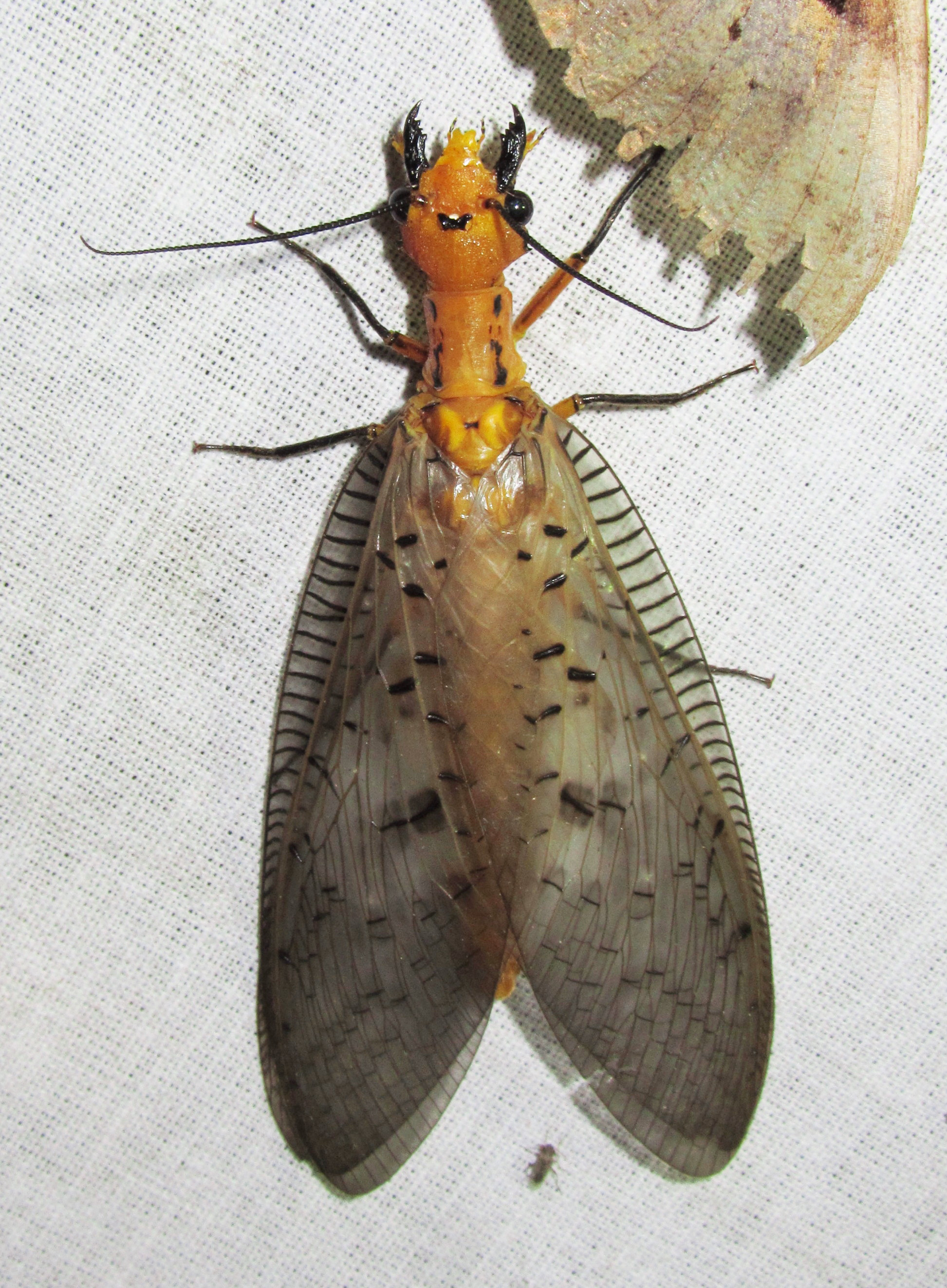
- Neoneuromus sikkimmensis from Arunachal Pradesh

Scientific classification
- Kingdom: Animalia
- Phylum: Arthropoda
- Clade: Pancrustacea
- Class: Insecta
- Order: Megaloptera
- Family: Corydalidae
- Subfamily: Corydalinae
- Genus: Neoneuromus van der Weele, 1907

Type species
- Neuromus fenestralis McLachlan, 1869

= Neoneuromus =

Genus of insects

Neoneuromus is a genus of dobsonfly endemic to the Indomalayan realm with 13 species. The larvae breed in montane streams. Adults are large with a forewing of 43 to 68 mm length and the body is yellow to red or brown with black marks on the head and pronotum. The wings are marked in dark patterning in the membrane and along the veins. They are closely related to Nevromus from which they are separated by the attenuation of the ninth sternum with an incised tip.

Species in the genus include:

- Neoneuromus indistinctus Liu, Hayashi & Yang, 2018
- Neoneuromus maculatus Liu, Hayashi & Yang, 2018
- Neoneuromus niger Liu, Hayashi & Yang, 2018
- Neoneuromus similis Liu, Hayashi & Yang, 2018
- Neoneuromus vanderweelei Liu, Hayashi & Yang, 2018
- Neoneuromus coomani Lestage, 1927
- Neoneuromus orientalis Liu & Yang, 2004
- Neoneuromus tonkinensis (van der Weele, 1907)
- Neoneuromus fenestralis (McLachlan, 1869)
- Neoneuromus ignobilis (Navás, 1932)
- Neoneuromus latratus (McLachlan, 1869)
- Neoneuromus sikkimmensis (van der Weele, 1907)
- Neoneuromus maclachlani (van der Weele, 1907)
