= Chloronia mexicana =

Scientific classification
- Kingdom: Animalia
- Phylum: Arthropoda
- Clade: Pancrustacea
- Class: Insecta
- Order: Megaloptera
- Family: Corydalidae
- Genus: Chloronia
- Species: C. mexicana

Binomial name
- Chloronia mexicana Stitz, 1914

Species of dobsonfly

Chloronia mexicana is a species of dobsonfly known from Mexico, Costa Rica, Honduras, and Guatemala.

== Description ==
Members of the genus are large and yellow with dark markings. This species is quite characteristic compared to other Chloronia species. It can be distinguished without examining the male genitalia by having the majority of the antennae darkened apically and the absence of spots on most of the wing except for a few basal ones. The numerous dark crossveins are also important. Both males and females can be securely identified based on these external characters. The forewing length of the male is 28–37 mm and the forewing length of the female is 30–45 mm.

== Biology ==
It is associated with warm and semi-warm climates with moderate to high rainfall. Chloronia mexicana is found in the following eight hydro-ecoregions:

1. Quintana Roo - Motagua (202)
2. Upper Usumacinta (174)
3. Grijalva - Usumacinta (173)
4. Coatzacoalcos (172)
5. Papaloapan (171)
6. Rio Balsas (169
7. Panuco (167)
8. Sierra Madre del Sur (170) (Partly)

The WWF hydro-ecoregion ID-number are also given in th list.
