= Chloronia bogotana =

Scientific classification
- Kingdom: Animalia
- Phylum: Arthropoda
- Clade: Pancrustacea
- Class: Insecta
- Order: Megaloptera
- Family: Corydalidae
- Genus: Chloronia
- Species: C. bogotana

Binomial name
- Chloronia bogotana van der Weele, 1909

Species of insect

Chloronia bogotana is a species of dobsonfly found in Colombia and possibly also Bolivia, Equador, Peru, and Venezuela.

== Description ==
This species is almost identical to Chloronia banksiana, even in the male genitalia. It can be distinguished from other Chloronia by a pair of posterolateral occipital bands on the head, a dark spot at the base of fore tibiae, and a male ninth abdominal sternum with strongly developed lateral lobes. The forewing length of the male is 36 mm.
