= Chloronia mirifica =

Scientific classification
- Kingdom: Animalia
- Phylum: Arthropoda
- Clade: Pancrustacea
- Class: Insecta
- Order: Megaloptera
- Family: Corydalidae
- Genus: Chloronia
- Species: C. mirifica

Binomial name
- Chloronia mirifica Navás, 1925

Synonyms
- Chloronia hieratica Navás, 1928

Species of insect

Chloronia mirifica is an insect in the family Corydalidae. It occurs in the Neotropical realm.

== Description ==
This species keys out based on the following characters: the head has two dark spots posteriorly, the antennae are pale and not infuscate, posterior margin of the male ninth sternum produced into distinct elongate lobes, tenth tergite straight and at least twice as long as ninth gonostylus, the ninth gonostylus is slightly narrowed basally, and the tenth gonostylus is very broad basally, tapering to a sharp point.

The length of the male forewing is 29–40 mm and the forewing length of the female is 25–42 mm.

== Biology ==
It is the most widely distributed species in the genus and may be the most commonly encountered Chloronia species in Costa Rica. It is associated with tropical climates with semi-warm to warm temperatures that experience hig rainfall. It is mainly found from May to October.

This species is associated with the following five hydro-ecoregions (WWF ID-numbers are given):

1. Quintana Roo – Motagua (202)
2. Upper Usumacinta (174)
3. Grijalva – Usumacinta (173)
4. Coatzacoalcos (172)
5. Papaloapan (171
