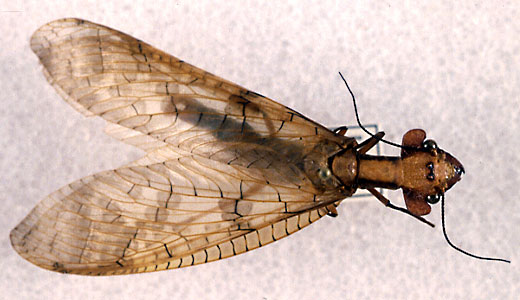
- Male Platyneuromus soror from Costa Rica. Note the large postocular flanges.

Scientific classification
- Kingdom: Animalia
- Phylum: Arthropoda
- Class: Insecta
- Order: Megaloptera
- Family: Corydalidae
- Subfamily: Corydalinae
- Genus: Platyneuromus; Weele 1909

= Platyneuromus =

Genus of insects

Platyneuromus is a genus of dobsonflies in the family Corydalidae. They are found in Mexico and Central America.

== Description ==
Platyneuromus adults have a distinctive appearance. Unlike dobsonflies of the genus Corydalus, in which males often develop large mandibles, adults have large postocular flanges behind the eyes. Males have mandibles of similar size to females, but often have disproportionately larger flanges, possibly a result of sexual selection. The postocular flanges are also visible in the pupae, facilitating diagnosis of the genus. Male forewing length ranges from 26–59 mm.

Larvae are typical hellgrammites, and fill a similar ecological niche to larvae of Corydalus and other genera. There appears to be an altitudinal gradient between Platyneuromus and Corydalus in Mexico. At low elevations (about 500 m), under a semiarid climate, only C. luteus Hagen is found. At mid elevations (about 750 m), within forested vegetation, both C. luteus and P. soror co-occur, but higher up (ca. 1400 m), only P. soror is nearly always collected.

== Species ==
- Platyneuromus honduranus Navás, 1928 (syn. P. auritus Kimmins, 1928) ---Guatemala, Honduras, Mexico
- Platyneuromus reflexus Glorioso and Flint, 1984 ---Guatemala & Mexico
- Platyneuromus soror Hagen, 1861 (syn. Doeringia christel Navás, 1925) ---Costa Rica, Mexico, Panama
- Platyneuromus species A (possible new species based on distinct larvae from western Mexico (Contreras-Ramos & Harris 1998))
