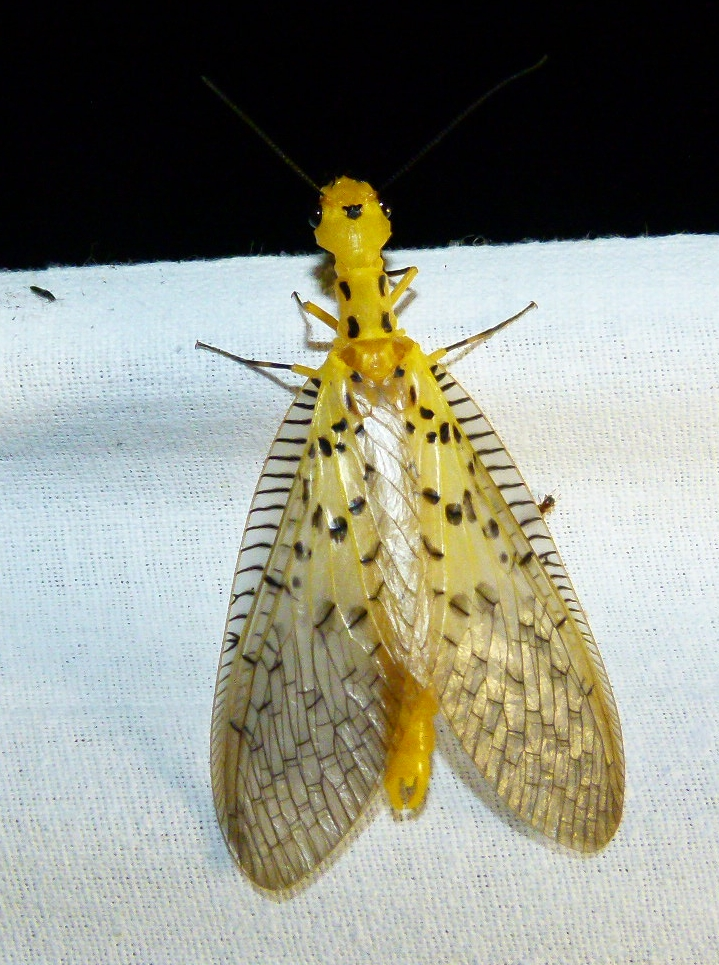
- Nevromus austroindicus

Scientific classification
- Kingdom: Animalia
- Phylum: Arthropoda
- Clade: Pancrustacea
- Class: Insecta
- Order: Megaloptera
- Family: Corydalidae
- Subfamily: Corydalinae
- Genus: Nevromus; Rambur, 1842

Species
- N. aspoeck; N. exterior; N. intimus; N. austroindicus; N. gloriosoi; N. testaceus

= Nevromus =

Genus of insects

Nevromus is a genus in the dobsonfly or Corydalidae family of Megalopteran insects. They are found in Asia and are among the few Asian Corydalines that are found on islands including Borneo, Java and Sumatra.

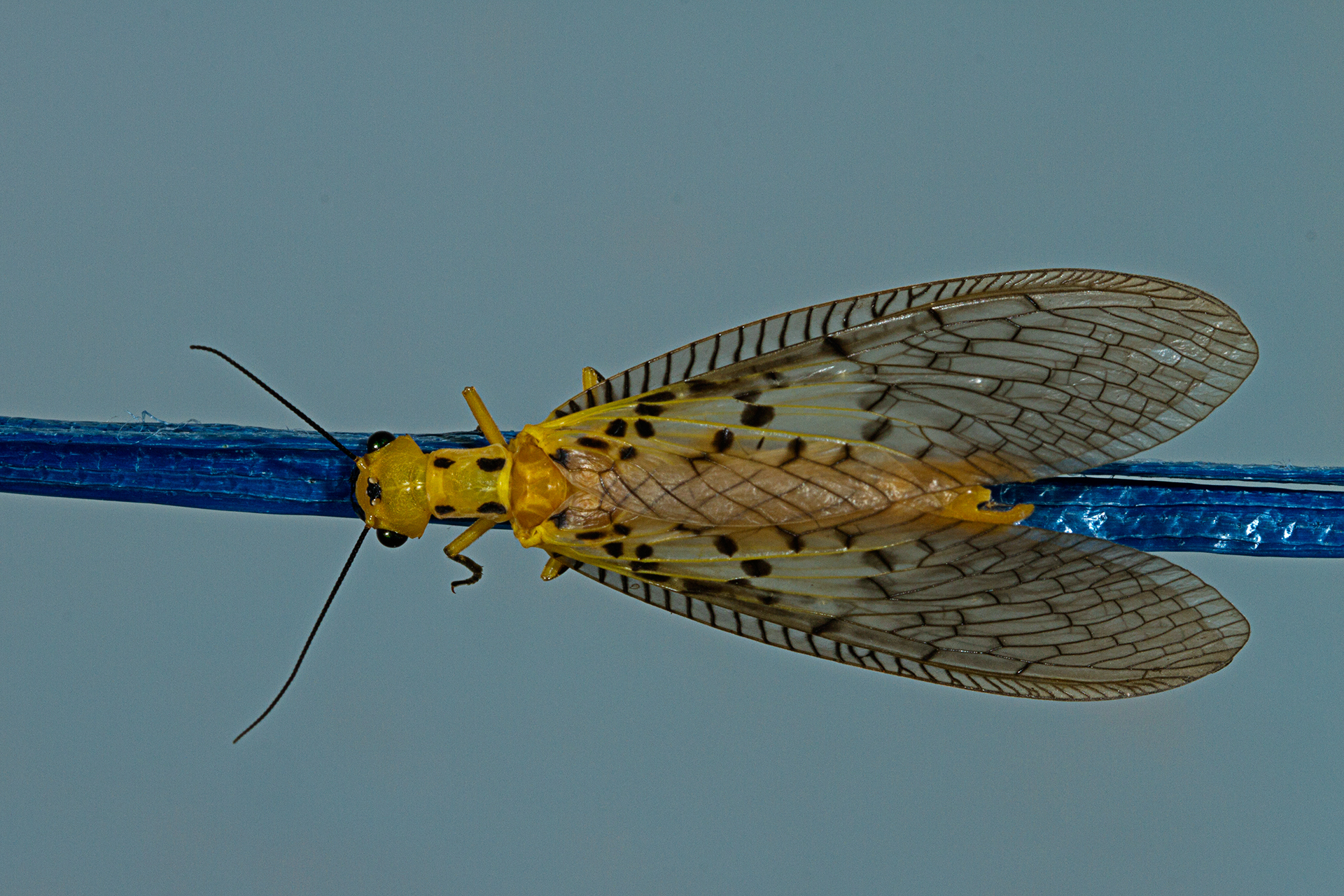
N. austroindicus
