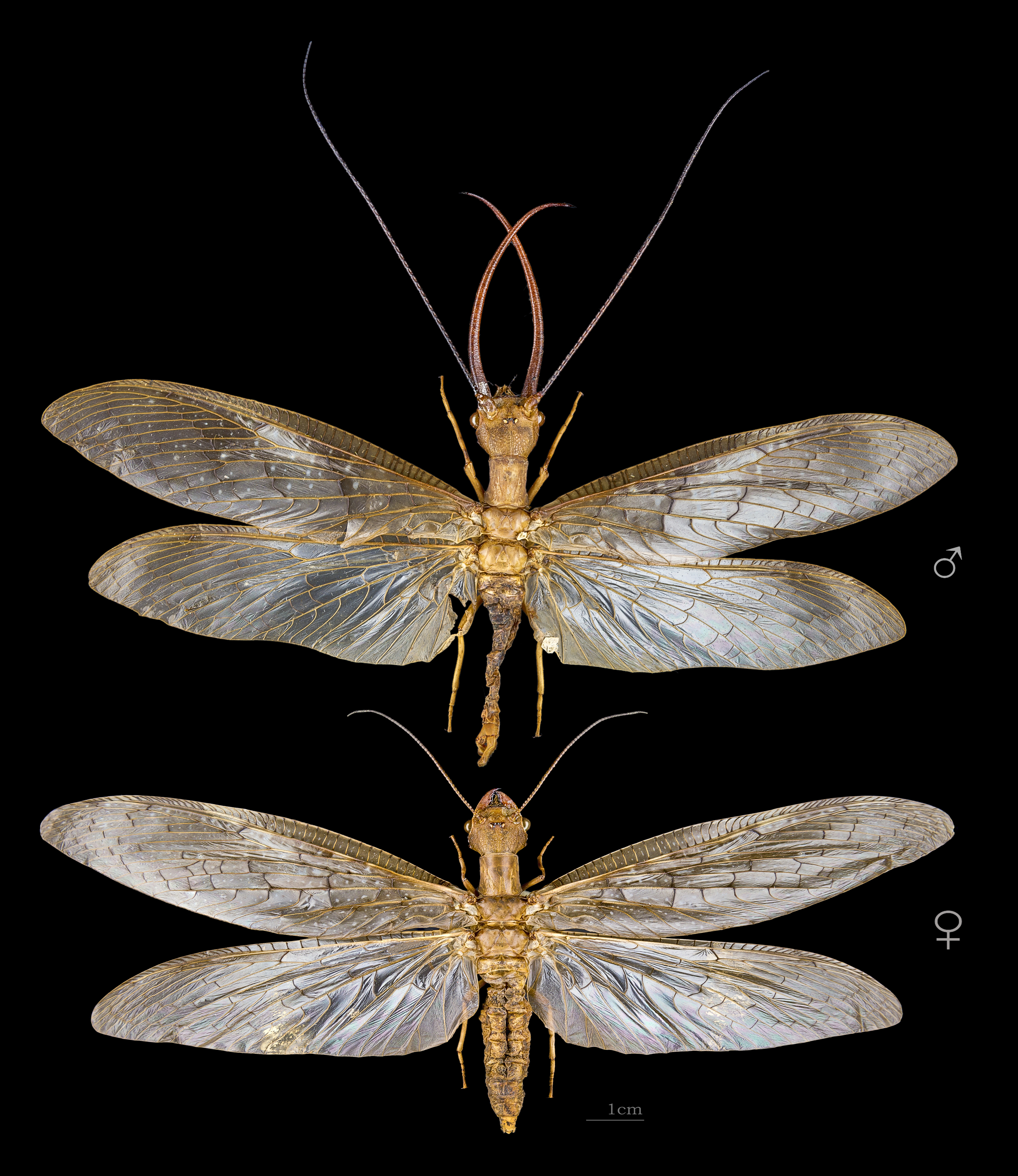
- Corydalus cornutus

Scientific classification
- Kingdom: Animalia
- Phylum: Arthropoda
- Clade: Pancrustacea
- Class: Insecta
- Order: Megaloptera
- Family: Corydalidae
- Subfamily: Corydalinae

Genera
- See Systematics

= Dobsonfly =

Subfamily of insects

Dobsonflies are a subfamily of insects, Corydalinae, part of the Megalopteran family Corydalidae. The larvae (commonly called hellgrammites) are aquatic, living in streams, and the adults are often found along streams as well. The nine genera of dobsonflies are distributed in the Americas, Asia, and South Africa.

== Etymology ==
The origin of the word "dobsonfly" is unclear. The term was in common use by at least 1878, as the records from the annual meeting of the Entomological Club of the American Association for the Advancement of Science that year contain:

"In discussion it was stated that the somewhat peculiar name of the 'Hellgrammite Fly' for the Corydalis had been for many years in common use both on the Upper and Lower Mississippi and that the equally curious name of 'Dobson' was given to its larva, which was largely used for bait by the river fishermen."

During this time there were also many more vernacular names for the larva. Below is a chart which shows some of the names in circulation and their locations in 1883, as heard from fishermen.

Name	Location Documented
Dobson	Popular Use
Hellgrammite	Popular Use
The Crawler	Janesville, WI
Dam-worm	Fox and Rock Rivers, WI
The Andy	Fulton, NY
Black Crabs	Fulton, NY
White Crabs	Fulton, NY
Flying Crabs	Fulton, NY
Scrabbles	Broome County, NY
Molly-Grubs	Broome County, NY
Black Worms	Schenectady, NY
Flying Worms	Schenectady, NY
Stone Crab	Milford, NY
Sand Crab	Milford, NY
Hell Devils	Monroe, NY
The Dragon	Schoharie, NY
Clipper	Port Jervis, NY Honesdale, PA
Conniption Bugs	Towanda, PA
Bogart	Portland, PA
Crawler	Perkiomen, PA
Ho Jack	Carlisle, PA Pond Eddy, PA
Devil Catchers	Wyalusing, PA
Snake Doctor	Hanover, PA
Hiltamites	Tulpehocken Dam, PA
Alugmites	Tulpehocken Dam, PA
Stone Climber	Schuylkill River, PA
Clipper Bug	Schuylkill River, PA
The Devil	Hazleton, PA
Water Grampus	Lambertville, NJ
Goggle Goy	Tumble, NJ
Black Crab	Belvidere, NJ
Crock	Interior of NJ
Red Crab	Raleigh, NC
Yellow Crab	Raleigh, NC
Hell Divers	Raleigh, NC
Devil Catcher	*location not given*
Dobsill	*location not given*
Hell-Lion	*location not given*
Kill-Devil	*location not given*

== Description ==
Adult dobsonflies are some of the largest non-Lepidopteran insects of temperate zones such as the United States and Canada, with a wingspan of up to 18 cm (7.1 in) in some species of Corydalus. The Asian Acanthacorydalis fruhstorferi can have a wingspan of up to 21.6 cm (8.5 in), making it the largest dobsonfly and the largest aquatic insect in the world by this measurement. The wings vary from a grayish to translucent shade, depending on the species, and the anal region of the hindwing is wide and folded at rest. Despite the large wings, adults are weak, fluttery fliers. The body is soft and coloration varies from yellow to dark shades of brown. The body typically does not surpass 7.5 cm (3.0 in) in length, although the largest Asian Acanthacorydalis may reach 10.5 cm (4.1 in).

Adult males of many—but not all—species are easily recognized by their long, curving mandibles. Examples of species with large-mandibled males include the genera Acanthacorydalis, Corydalus and Platyneuromus, while in Neoneuromus, Nevromus, Neurhermes and Protohermes the sexes are similar. In Corydalus cornutus, a particularly long-mandibled species, these can reach up to 4 cm (1.6 in) in length and are used in competition for females. It is possible that the mandibles may have been selected as secondary sex characteristics used by females to evaluate males during courtship. Males cannot use these mandibles to bite because they are too long; on the other hand, females have short, heavily sclerotized mandibles which enable them to deliver powerful bites when threatened. Males of many species will also produce nuptial gifts in the form of packages of nutrient-rich spermatophores that are eaten by the female partner after mating. This has been shown to be negatively correlated to mandible size; in species where the males have large mandibles the "nuptial gift" is small or absent, while it is large in species where males lack the exaggerated mandibles. Two genera, Chloroniella and Chloronia, are unusual in that the males lack large mandibles and do not produce "nuptial gifts". The antennae of males are also noticeably elongated, even longer than the mandibles.

Corydalinae is distinguished from closely related clades by the following synapomorphies (with exceptions in a few species): quadrate head with a postocular spine, ridge, and plane, non-pectinate antennae, four crossveins between the radius and the radial sector, and distinctive male terminalia with a well developed ninth gonostylus.

In regards to the larvae, entomologist John Henry Comstock wrote in his 1897 book Insect Life, "In spite of its disagreeable appearance it is in some respects very interesting to students of Nature study." The larvae, commonly called hellgrammites, are perhaps better known than the adults due to their more readily findable nature. They are unusual in that although they are generally aquatic, taking in dissolved oxygen through abdominal lateral filaments and tracheal gills, they also have spiracles that allow them to take in air directly when above water.

Larvae of dobsonflies differ from those of their sister clade, the alderflies, in that they bear eight pairs of lateral processes as well as anal prolegs with a pair of terminal hooks used to hold themselves to substrate, and also in that they lack a terminal filament. At the end of the abdomen is a pair of claw-like structures. Body color is black or dark brown.

== Systematics ==
There are about sixty species of dobsonflies. Contreras-Ramos suggests nine genera within Corydalinae, divided into four lineages. Working from "most basal" to "most derived" lineages, there are:

- The Protohermes lineage, containing the genera Neurhermes and Protohermes, distributed from Northwest India to Indonesia, China, and Japan.
- The Chloroniella lineage, containing the monotypic genus Chloroniella, found only in South Africa.
- The Nevromus lineage, containing the genera Acanthacorydalis, Nevromus, and Neoneuromus, distributed from Northwest India to Southeast Asia.
- The Corydalus lineage, containing the genera Platyneuromus, Chloronia, and Corydalus, distributed from southern Canada down to northern Argentina and south-east Brazil.

As of 2022, Neurhermes is not a valid genus, as it has become a junior synonym of Protohermes.

A 2025 study made the following phylogeny using molecular techniques:

- Corydalinae
  - Chloroniella
  - - Protohermes
    - - - Acanthacorydalis
        - - Platyneuromus
          - - Chloronia
            - Corydalus
      - - Nevromus
        - Neoneuromus

== Diet and behavior ==
The larvae of dobsonflies live along the rocky bottoms of streams. Chiefly active during the night, they ambush prey in the middle of riffles which supply plenty of oxygen and stir up prey. They are generalist predators; dissections have revealed that they primarily eat aquatic immatures of mayflies, caddisflies, stoneflies, and chironomid midges. Although the larvae spend most of their lives under rocks below water, locals along Virginia and Pennsylvania rivers have reported emergences, known as "hellgrammite crawlings", during thunderstorms.

The adults are also nocturnal, and are seldom seen as they hide under leaves in the canopy during the daytime. However, they do sometimes form aggregations under bridges or other structures along streams. Since the adults live only about a week, they are not known to eat anything, although they have been reported to drink sweet solution in captivity.

The dobsonfly may be attracted by mercaptan, an indicator additive in natural gas and propane, and may behave as an animal sentinel in the presence of these gases.

== Life cycle ==
The metamorphosis from larva to adult in dobsonflies is one of the simplest of the holometabolous orders, yet the life cycle begins with an intriguing ritualized courtship display (most of the following comes from Simonsen et al. 2008 and all pertains to Corydalus; other courtship rituals remain unknown). Males compete with each other for females, aggressively fluttering the wings and trying to place their long mandibles underneath the body of the opponent in order to flip him into the air. Afterwards, the male approaches a female from the side and touches her with his antennae. At first the female reacts somewhat aggressively, moving the head from side to side with mandibles wide apart. However, she then allows the male to come closer and place his mandibles over her wings in a perpendicular position, a position he holds until the female signals reception to mating.

At least in Protohermes, during copulation the male attaches to the female's genitalia a large, globular spermatophore about 4 mm (1/8 in) long and wide. The spermatophore consists of two parts: a large gelatinous mass, and a smaller seminal duct containing the sperm. After copulation, the female proceeds to spread her legs wide apart, curl the abdomen under the chest, and eat the gelatinous part of the spermatophore.

Oviposition occurs along rocky walls of streams at night, from May to September in Corydalus. The females deposit coin-size egg masses containing on average one thousand grey, cylindrical eggs, each egg about 1.5 mm (1/16 in) long and 0.5 mm (1/32 in) wide. This mass is covered by a layer of a chalky, white substance, which probably protects the eggs from desiccation and overheating. Females tend to deposit egg masses at relatively few sites, resulting in grouped egg masses.

One to two weeks after oviposition, the eggs hatch and the first instar larvae either fall directly into the stream or if not, immediately search for water. There the larvae live for up to five years, going through 10-12 instar molts. When they have finally reached maturity, the larvae leave the water and find a rock, log, or anthropogenic debris, typically close to the stream but sometimes up to 40 m away. There they construct a chamber for pupation and spend several days to several weeks as prepupae before shedding the exoskeleton and spending about a week to two weeks as pupae. The pupae are yellow-orange with dark spots on the dorsum of the abdomen, covered in minute setae, and exarate (i.e. the developing appendages and mouthparts are attached only at their proximal ends). Although the males have a small tubercle on the prothoracic sternum and a slightly wider head than the females, the mandibles are not as noticeably divergent as in the adults. Finally, the pupae emerge from the chamber, leaving behind the larval and pupal skins.

== Uses ==
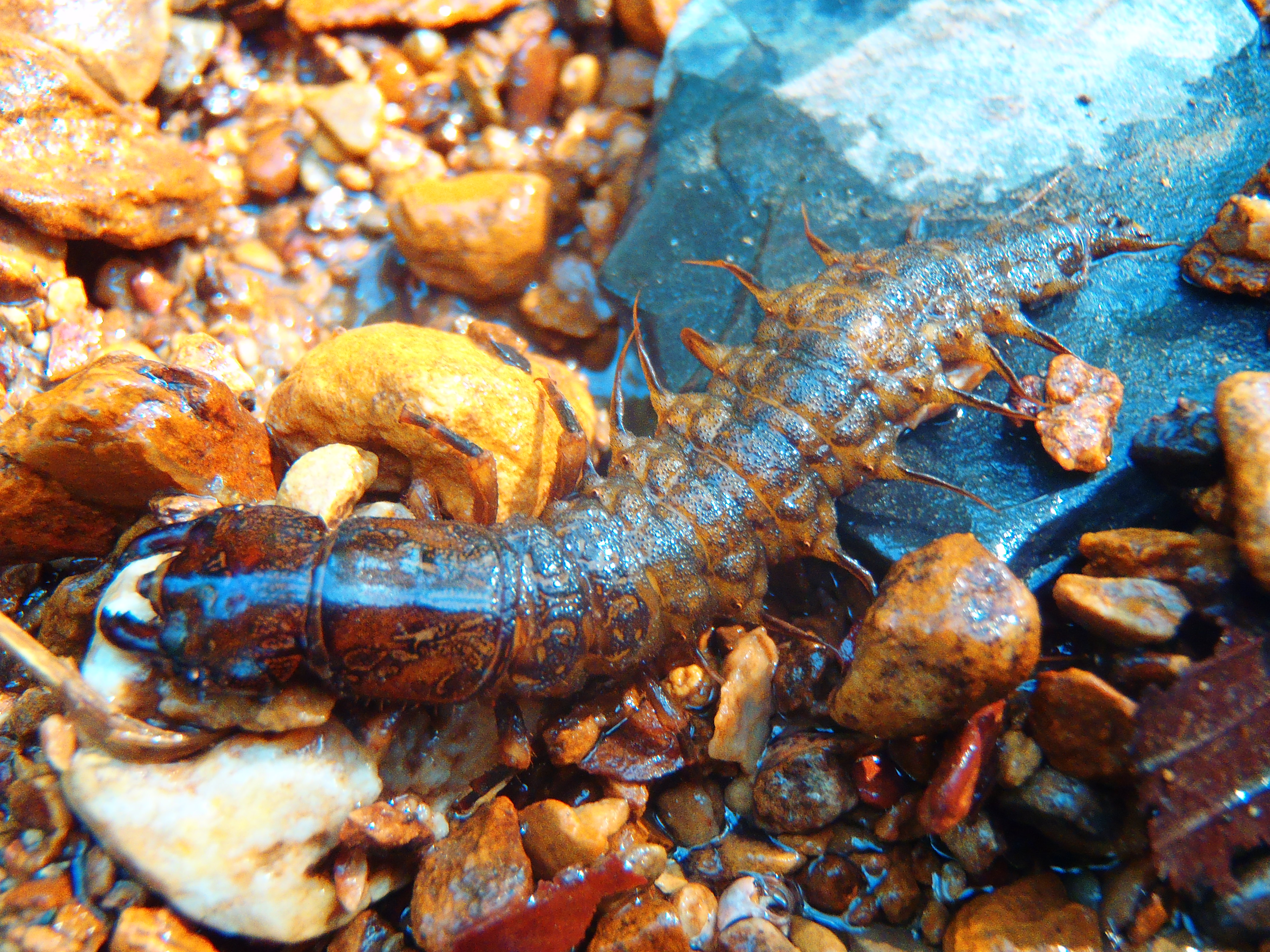
Hellgrammite (larval form of the dobsonfly) found in a Tennessee stream

Hellgrammites are popular among anglers as bait due to their large size, endurance, and ferocious temperament. Smallmouth bass, in particular, are very attracted to hellgrammites as bait, due to the insects' active movement in the water. John Henry Comstock suggested securing a net or wire screen to the rocky bottom of a creek and disturbing the rocks just upstream of the screen as a method to catch the larvae. They often run for relatively high prices at bait shops, leading to over-exploitation in some areas and regulation of sale in certain states. Some anglers instead use lures in the shape of hellgrammites.

Although not to the same extent as the larvae of mayflies and caddisflies, hellgrammites are intolerant of polluted waters and may have potential to be used as indicators of water quality.

As the adults are strongly attracted to lights, entomologists and collectors often use black light and mercury-vapor light traps to capture them.

== Gallery ==
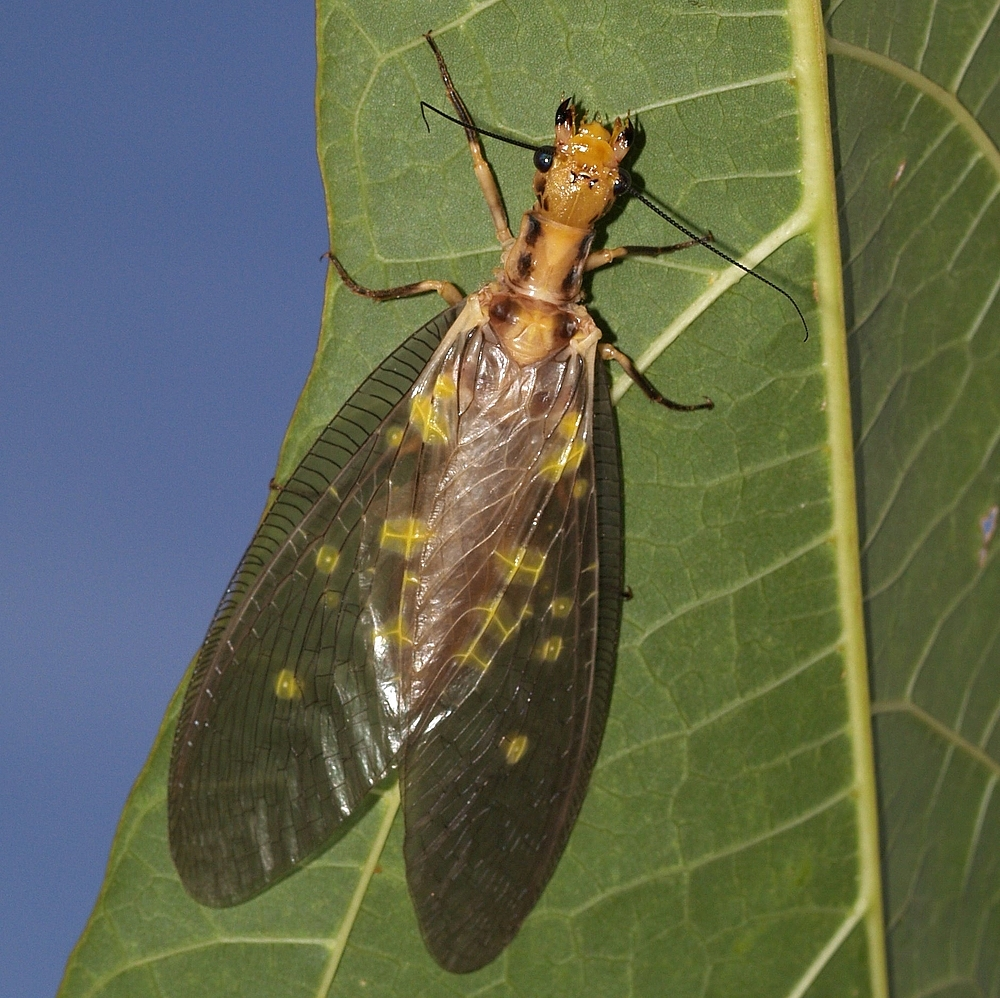
Protohermes grandis

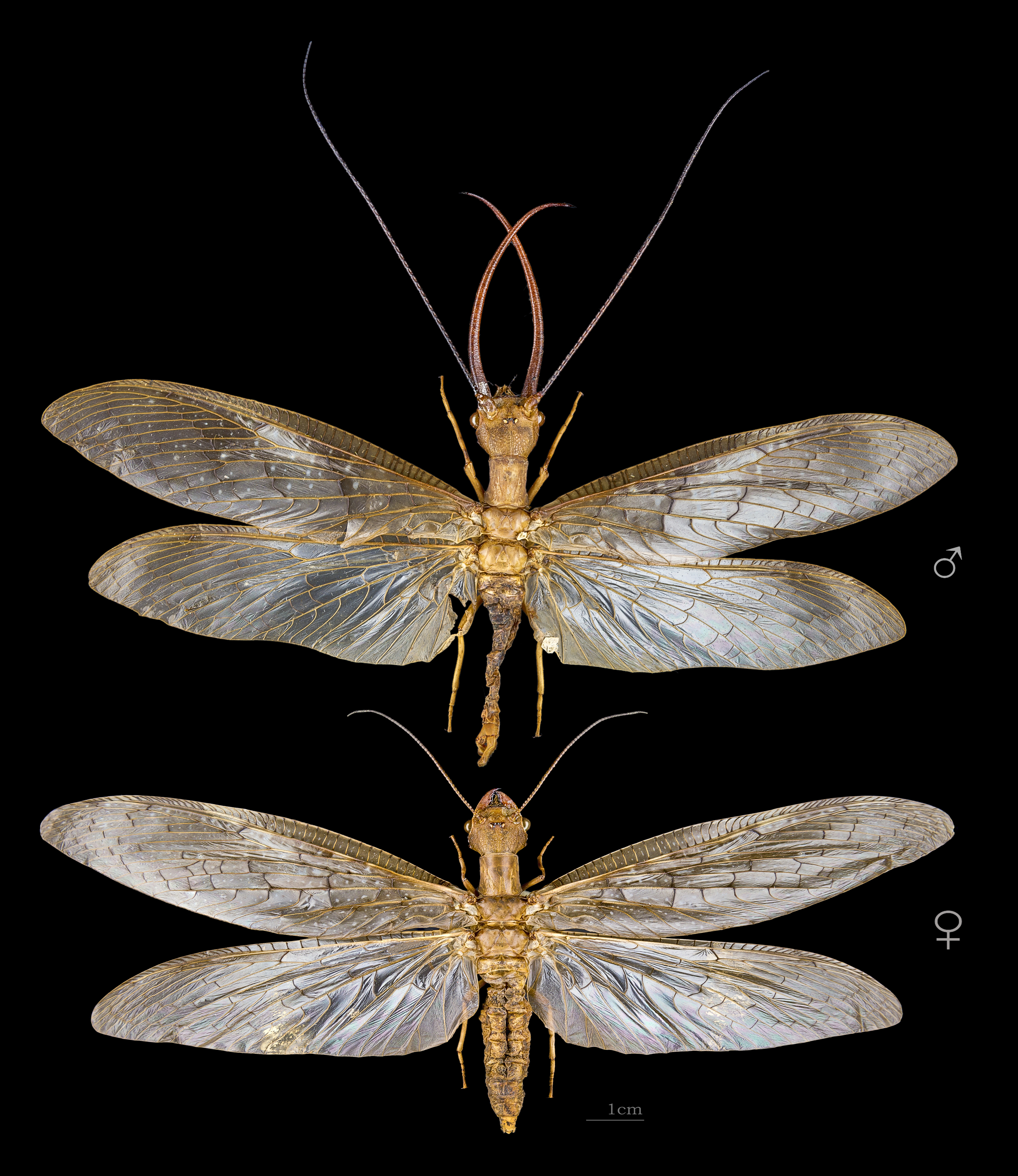
Corydalus cornutus

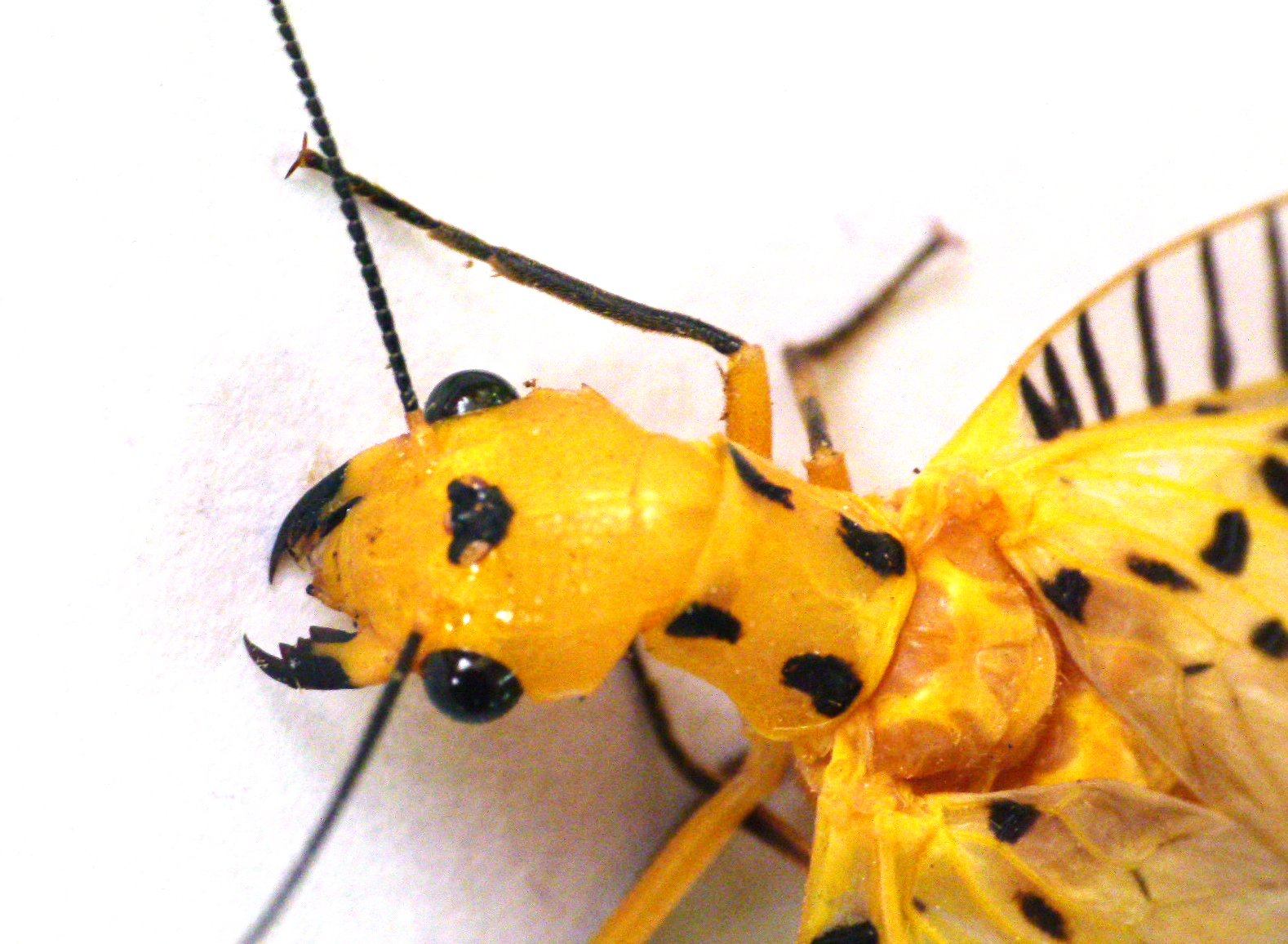
Nevromus austroindicus

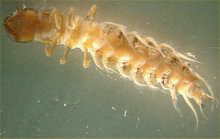
Corydalus cornutus hellgrammite

Media related to Corydalinae at Wikimedia Commons
