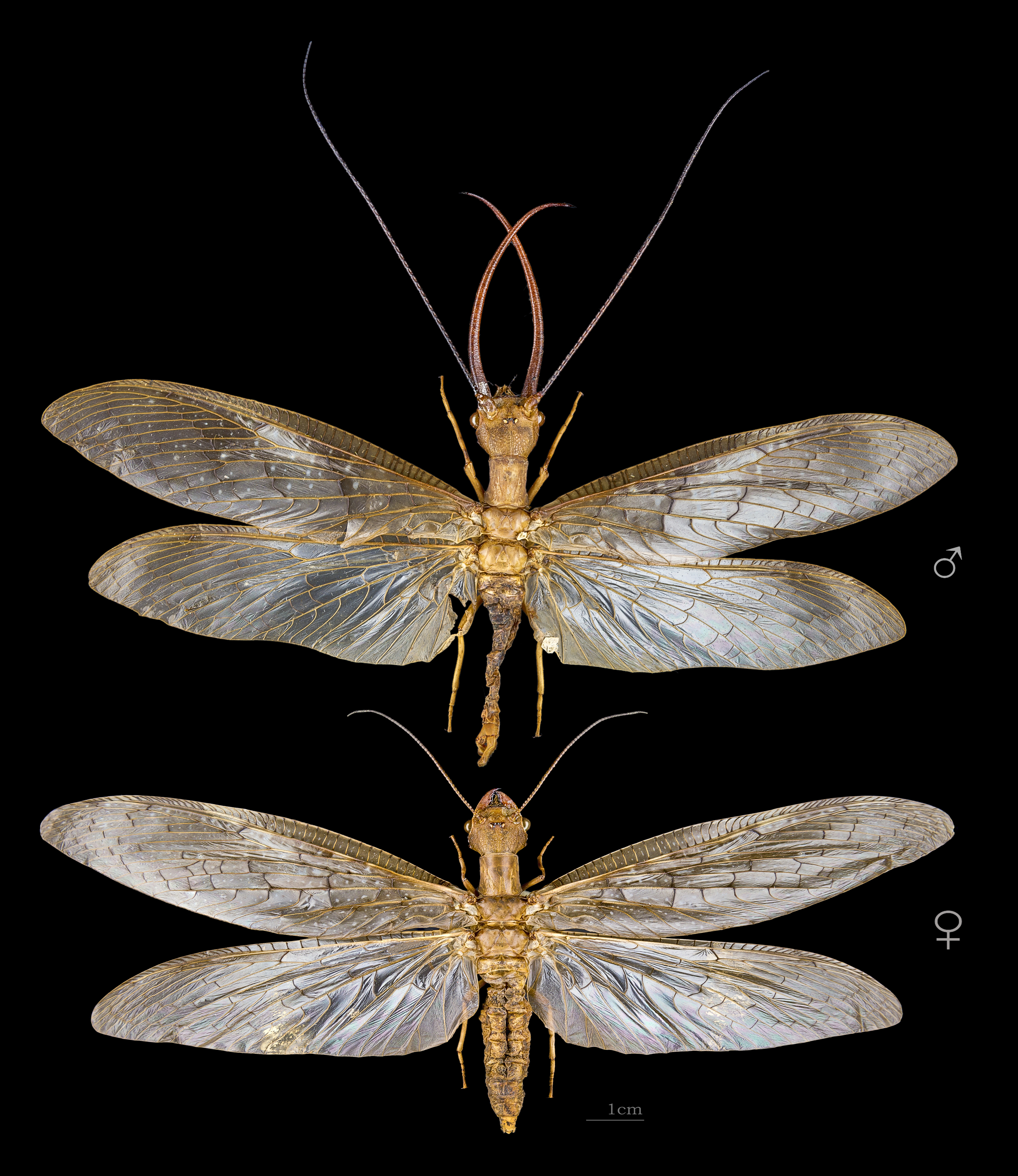
- a Corydalus species

Scientific classification
- Kingdom: Animalia
- Phylum: Arthropoda
- Clade: Pancrustacea
- Class: Insecta
- Order: Megaloptera
- Family: Corydalidae; Leach 1815

Subfamilies
- Chauliodinae; Corydalinae

= Corydalidae =

Corydalidae Temporal range: Jurassic–Recent

Family of insects

The family Corydalidae contains the megalopterous insects known as dobsonflies and fishflies. Making up about three dozen genera, they occur primarily throughout North America, both temperate and tropical, South America, Australia, New Zealand, Africa (particularly South Africa) and Asia.

They are sizeable Megaloptera, with a body usually larger than 25 mm (1 inch). They often have long filamentous antennae, though in male fishflies they are characteristically feathered. Ocelli are present; the fourth tarsal segment is cylinder-shaped. The four large wings are translucent, smoky grey, or mixed, and the anterior pair is slightly longer than the posterior one. Their aquatic larvae are used as fish bait and are called hellgrammites. The larvae are aquatic, active, armed with strong sharp mandibles, and breathe by means of abdominal branchial filaments. When full sized — which can take several years — they leave the water and spend a quiescent pupal stage on the land, in chambers dug under stones or logs, before metamorphosis into the sexually mature insect.

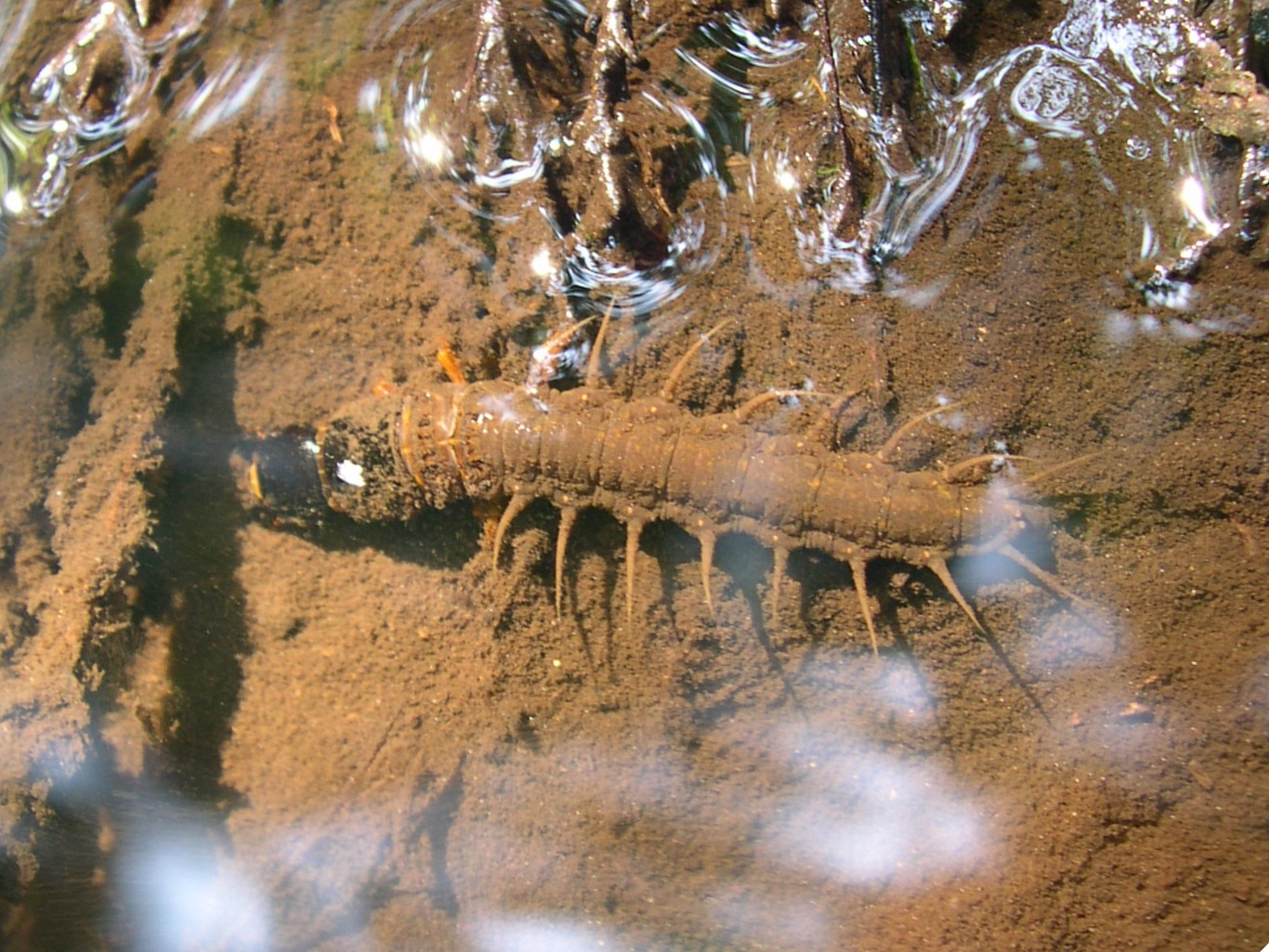
Parachauliodes japonicus

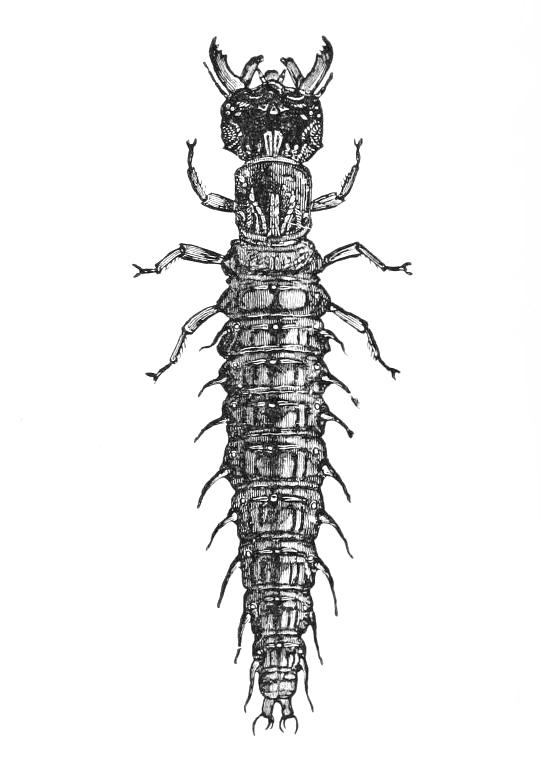
Larva

== Distribution ==
The eastern dobsonfly, Corydalus cornutus, is the most well-known North American species among the dobsonflies. These genera have distinctive elongated mandibles in males and form the subfamily Corydalinae. The genera in which the males have normal mandibles, called fishflies, form the subfamily Chauliodinae. The summer fishfly, Chauliodes pectinicornis, is perhaps the best-known of these in North America; its immense mating swarms in the Upper Mississippi River region fill the air on a few summer nights each year much like mayflies in certain regions of Europe, leaving millions of carcasses to be cleaned up the next day.

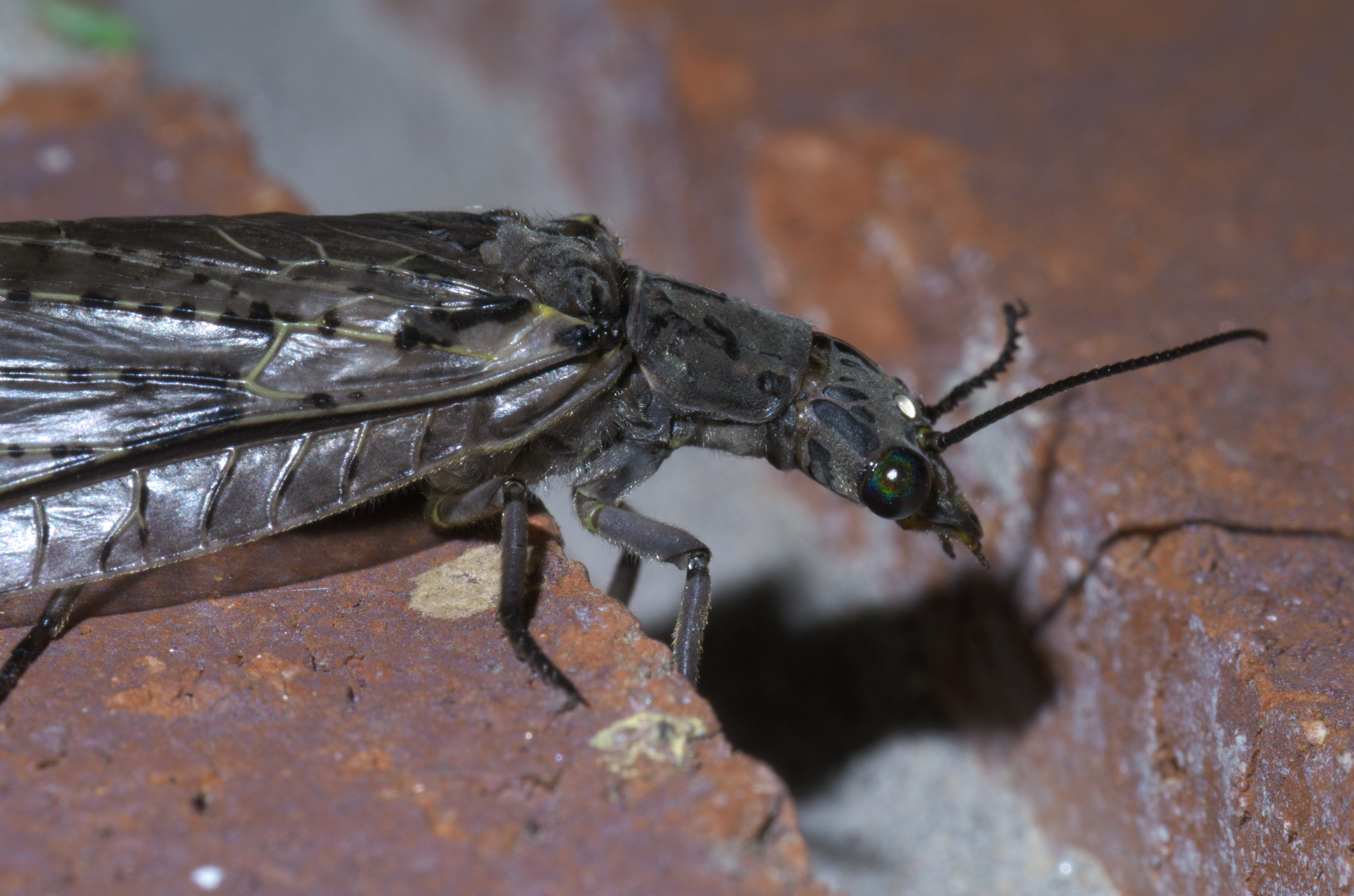
Chauliodes pectinicornis

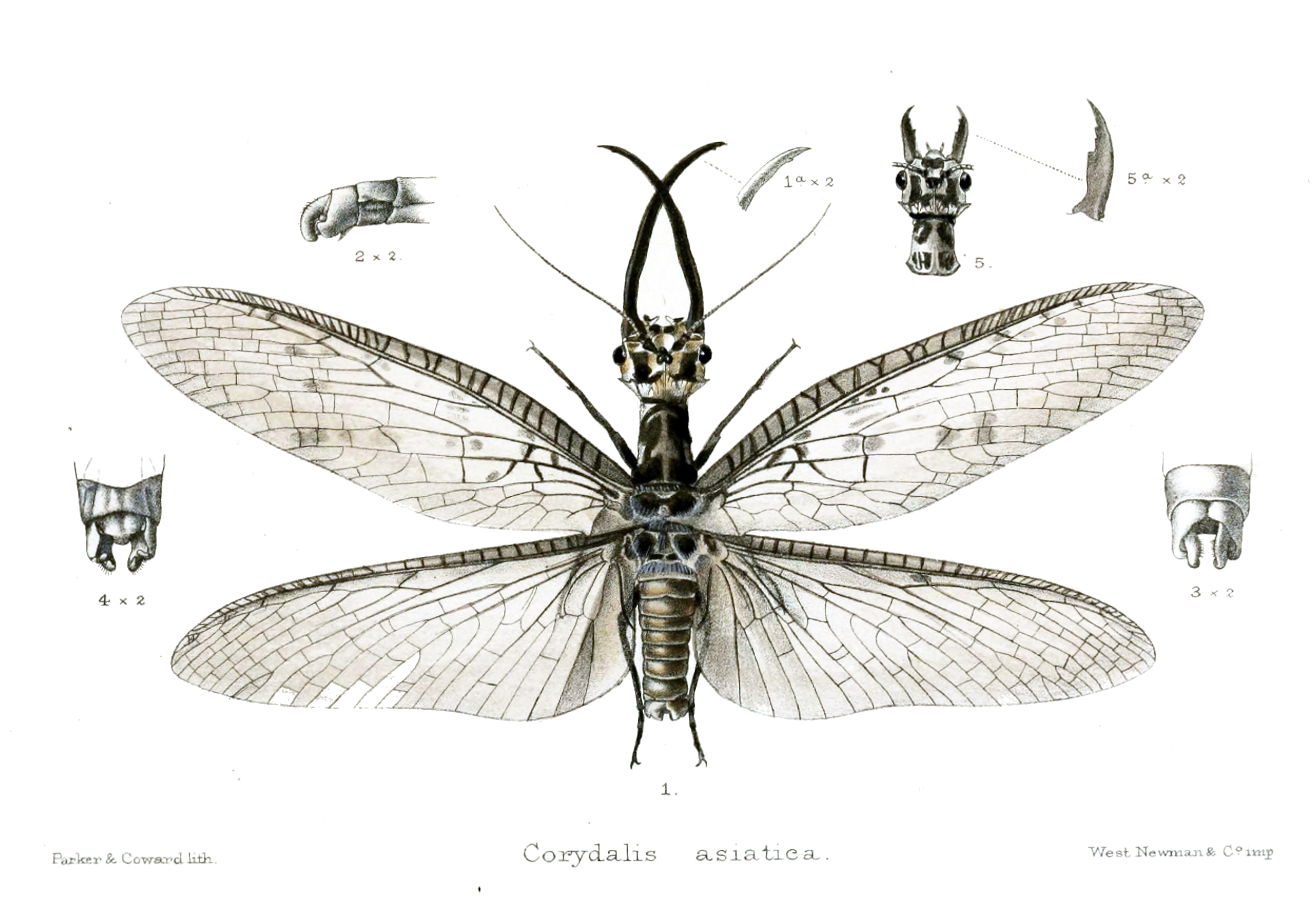
Acanthacorydalis asiatica

== Taxonomy ==
The family is divided into two subfamilies, the Corydalinae and the Chauliodinae. Classification and identification is based on external morphology and at the species level using male genitalia. These 31 genera belong to the family Corydalidae as of 2022:

  - Subfamily Corydalinae Leach in Brewster, 1815
- Genus Acanthacorydalis van der Weele, 1907
- Genus Chloronia Banks, 1908
- Genus Chloroniella Esben-Petersen, 1924
- Genus †Corydalites Scudder, 1878
- Genus Corydalus Latreille, 1802
- Genus Neoneuromus van der Weele, 1909
- Genus Nevromus Rambur, 1842
- Genus Platyneuromus van der Weele, 1909
- Genus Protohermes van der Weele, 1907

  - Subfamily Chauliodinae Newman, 1853
- Genus Anachauliodes Kimmins, 1954
- Genus Apochauliodes Theischinger, 1983
- Genus Archichauliodes van der Weele, 1909
- Genus Chauliodes Latreille, 1796
- Genus †Cretochaulus Ponomarenko, 1976
- Genus Ctenochauliodes van der Weele, 1909
- Genus Dysmicohermes Munroe, 1953
- Genus †Eochauliodes Liu et al., 2012
- Genus †Jurochauliodes Wang & Zhang, 2010
- Genus Madachauliodes Paulian, 1951
- Genus Neochauliodes van der Weele, 1909
- Genus Neohermes Banks, 1908
- Genus Nigronia Banks, 1908
- Genus Nothochauliodes Flint, 1983
- Genus Orohermes Evans, 1984
- Genus Parachauliodes van der Weele, 1909
- Genus Platychauliodes Esben-Petersen, 1924
- Genus Protochauliodes van der Weele, 1909
- Genus Puri Cardoso-Costa et al., 2013
- Genus Taeniochauliodes Esben-Petersen, 1924

  - Subfamily Incertae sedis
- Genus †Cratocorydalopsis Jepson & Heads, 2016
- Genus †Lithocorydalus Jepson & Heads, 2016
