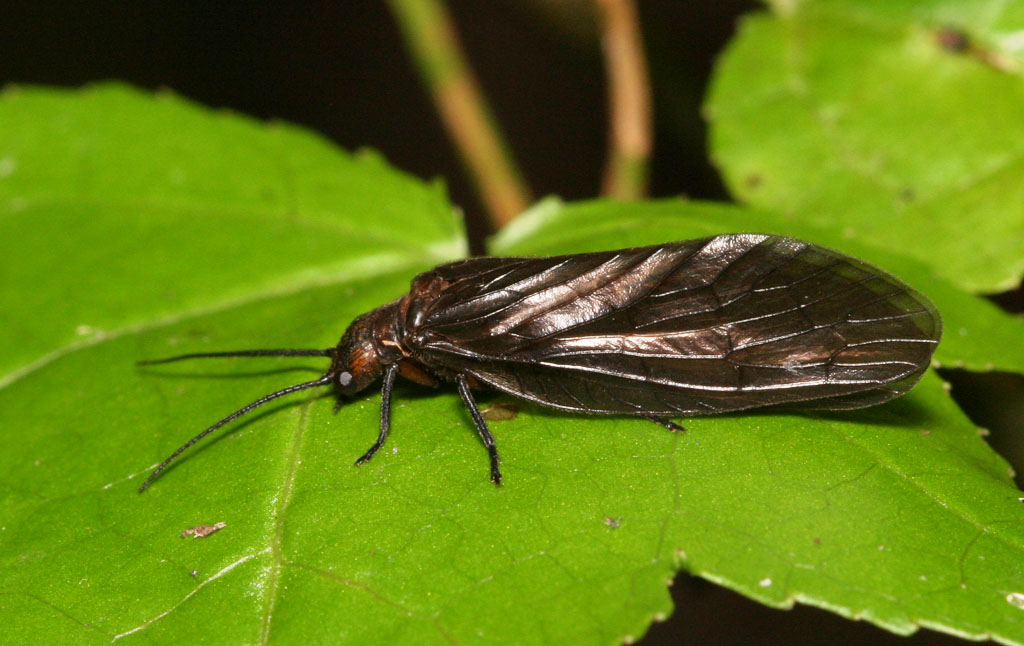
- Alderfly of the genus Sialis

Scientific classification
- Kingdom: Animalia
- Phylum: Arthropoda
- Clade: Pancrustacea
- Class: Insecta
- Clade: Neuropterida
- Order: Megaloptera; Latreille, 1802

Families
- Corydalidae; Chauliodinae (fishflies); Corydalinae (dobsonflies); Sialidae (alderflies); and see text

= Megaloptera =

Megaloptera Temporal range: Early Jurassic–Recent

Order of insects

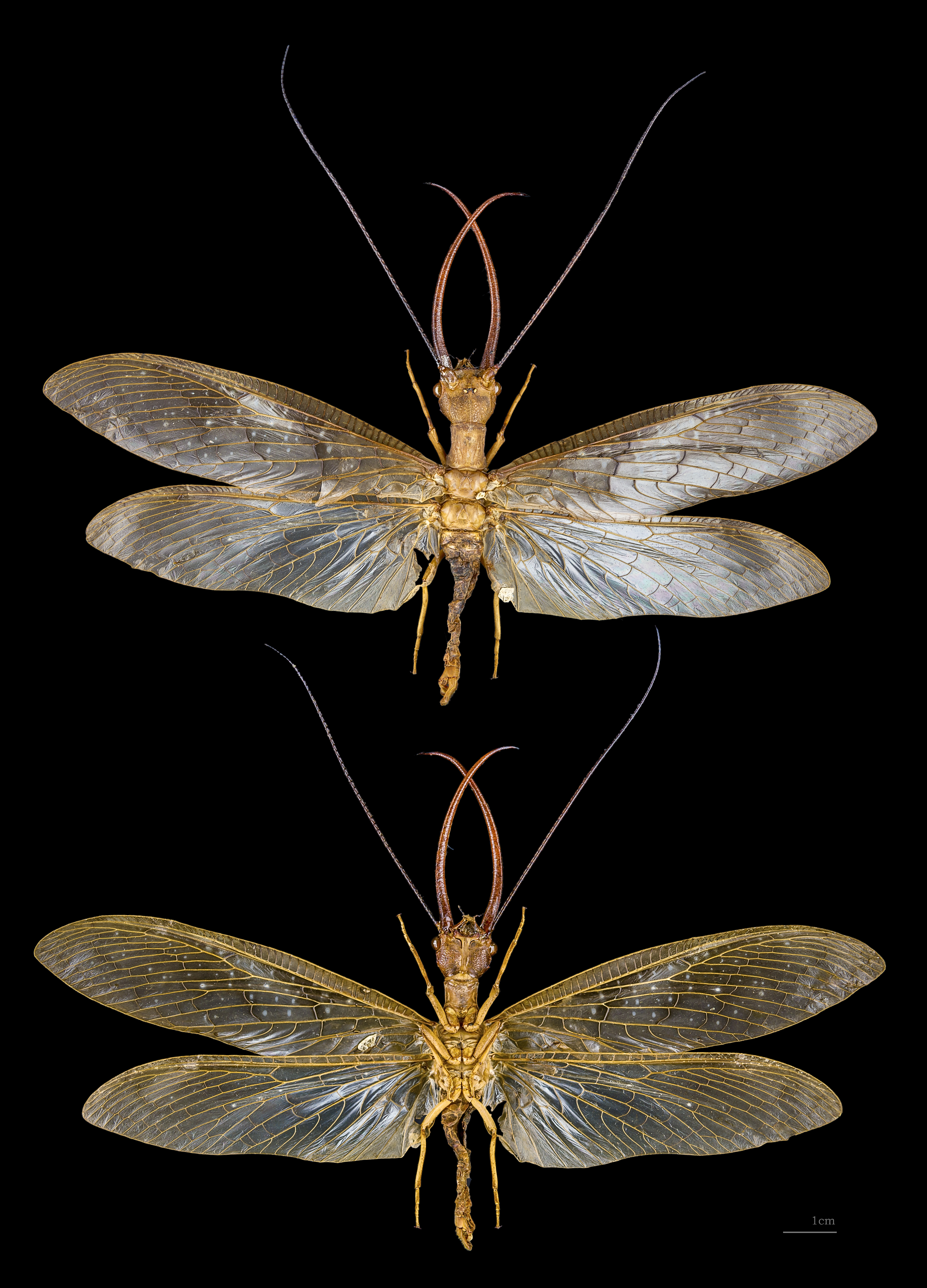
Corydalus cornutus - MHNT

Megaloptera is an order of insects. It contains the alderflies, dobsonflies and fishflies, and there are about 300 known species.

The order's name comes from Ancient Greek μέγας (mégas), meaning "large", and πτερόν (pterón), meaning "wing", in reference to the large, clumsy wings of these insects. Megaloptera are relatively unknown insects across much of their range, due to the adults' short lives, the aquatic larvae's often-high tolerance of pollution (so they are not often encountered by swimmers etc.), and the generally crepuscular or nocturnal habits. However, in the Americas the dobsonflies are rather well known, as their males have tusk-like mandibles. These, while formidable in appearance, are relatively harmless to humans and other animals; much like a peacock's feathers, they serve mainly to impress females. However, the mandibles are also used to hold females during mating, and some male dobsonflies spar with each other in courtship displays, trying to flip each other over with their long mandibles. Dobsonfly larvae, commonly called hellgrammites, are often used for angling bait in North America and are capable of delivering a painful bite with their mandibles.

The Megaloptera were formerly considered part of a group then called Neuroptera, together with lacewings and snakeflies, but these are now generally considered to be separate orders, with Neuroptera referring to the lacewings and relatives (which were formerly called Planipennia). The former Neuroptera, particularly the lacewing group, are nonetheless very closely related to each other, and the new name for this group is Neuropterida. This is either placed at superorder rank, with the Holometabola—of which they are part—becoming an unranked clade above it, or the Holometabola are maintained as a superorder, with an unranked Neuropterida being a part of them. Within the holometabolans, the closest living relatives of the neuropteridan clade are the beetles and strepsipterans.

The Asian dobsonfly Acanthacorydalis fruhstorferi can have a wingspan of up to 21.6 cm (8.5 in), making it the largest aquatic insect in the world by this measurement.

== Anatomy and life cycle ==
Adult megalopterans closely resemble the lacewings, except for the presence of a pleated region on their hindwings, helping them to fold over the abdomen. They have strong mandibles and mouthparts apparently adapted for chewing, although many species do not eat as adults. They have large compound eyes, and, in some species, also have ocelli. The wings are large and subequal.

The female may lay up to 3,000 eggs in a single mass, placing them on vegetation overhanging water. Megaloptera undergo the most rudimentary form of complete metamorphosis among the insects. There are fewer differences between the larval and adult forms of Megaloptera than in any other order of holometabolous insects, and their aquatic larvae dwell in fresh water, around which the adults also live. The larvae are carnivorous, and are known to feed on small invertebrates, such as crustaceans, clams, worms and other insects. They possess strong jaws that they use to capture their prey. They have large heads and elongated bodies. The abdomen bears a number of fine tactile filaments, which include tracheal gills on segments 1–7 in Sialidae and on segments 1–8 in Corydalidae. In addition, the larvae have two pairs of thoracic spiracles and eight pairs of abdominal spiracles which allows oxygen uptake directly from atmospheric air. The final segment of the abdomen bears either a pair of prolegs, or a single, tail-like appendage.

The larvae grow slowly, taking anywhere from 1 to 5 years to reach the last larval stage. When they reach maturity, the larvae crawl out onto land to pupate in damp soil or under logs. Unusually, the pupa is fully motile, with large mandibles that it can use to defend itself against predators. The short-lived adults emerge from the pupa to mate - many species never feed as adults, living only a few days or hours, up to a few weeks at most.

== Evolution ==
Apart from the two living families, there are a few prehistoric taxa sometimes placed Megaloptera, only known from fossils.

- Family Corydasialidae (Other authors place as members of Neuroptera)
- Family Parasialidae (placement within the Neuropterida uncertain)
- Family Euchauliodidae (other authors have suggested that this likely represents a "grylloblattid" instead)
- Family Nanosialidae (other authors consider this family more closely related to snakeflies)

The Megaloptera are monophyletic and are a sister clade of the Neuroptera. Within the Megaloptera, Corydalinae and Chauliodinae are sister clades. The oldest fossils confidently identifiable as megalopterans date to the Early Jurassic.
