= List of threatened fauna of Michigan =

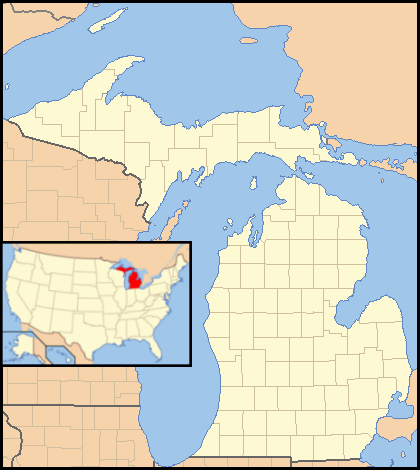
The state of Michigan, and its location in the United States

The list of threatened fauna of Michigan includes almost 400 endangered, threatened and special concern species that are located in Michigan as a part of the fauna of the United States. Endangered and threatened species in Michigan are protected through the Endangered Species Act of the State of Michigan, part of the 1994 Michigan Natural Resources and Environmental Protection Act. The list was last updated in 2009 to its sixth iteration. At this time, 69 new species were added, including many species of freshwater mussels and snails, and 13 species were removed. The state also recognizes species of special concern, which are not protected under the act. These species have low or declining numbers in the state or a need for additional information on their populations in Michigan. If the species' numbers decline, they are moved to threatened or endangered status and afforded protection under the act; if they increase, they are removed from the list without further action.

Threatened and endangered species can also be listed under the federal Endangered Species Act, passed in 1973; the act covers over 1,250 plant and animal species. Species can be on either list or both lists – representation on one does not automatically determine representation (or status) on the other.

A large portion of the field surveys and research conducted with regards to threatened and endangered species in Michigan is undertaken by the Michigan Natural Features Inventory (MNFI) program. The MNFI program was originally developed in 1980 as part of the state natural heritage programs conceptualized by The Nature Conservancy (TNC), through which it received its first funding. The MNFI program severed relations with TNC in 2000, and became a program of the Michigan State University Extension Services.

== Mammals ==
There are twelve species of threatened mammals in Michigan. Five of these are listed as species of threatened concern, three as threatened and four as endangered. Two also have federal listed status as endangered or threatened.

Species	Common name	State status	Federal status
Alces alces	Moose	Special concern	
Canis lupus	Gray wolf	Special concern	
Cryptotis parva	Least shrew	Threatened	
Puma concolor	Cougar	Endangered	
Glaucomys sabrinus	Northern flying squirrel	Special concern	
Lynx canadensis	Canada lynx	Endangered	Threatened
Microtus ochrogaster	Prairie vole	Endangered	
Microtus pinetorum	Woodland vole	Special concern	
Myotis sodalis	Indiana bat	Endangered	Endangered
Nycticeius humeralis	Evening bat	Threatened	
Pipistrellus subflavus	Eastern pipistrelle	Special concern	
Sorex fumeus	Smoky shrew	Threatened	

== Amphibians ==
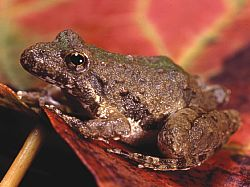
The Blanchard's cricket frog is threatened in Michigan.

There are five species and subspecies of threatened amphibians in Michigan. Two of these are listed as species of special concern, one as a threatened species and two as endangered. No amphibians with federally listed threatened status have populations in Michigan.

Species	Common name	State status
Acris crepitans blanchardi	Blanchard's cricket frog	Threatened
Ambystoma opacum	Marbled salamander	Endangered
Ambystoma texanum	Smallmouth salamander	Endangered
Pseudacris maculata	Boreal chorus frog	Special concern
Siren intermedia nettingi	Western lesser siren	Special concern

== Reptiles ==
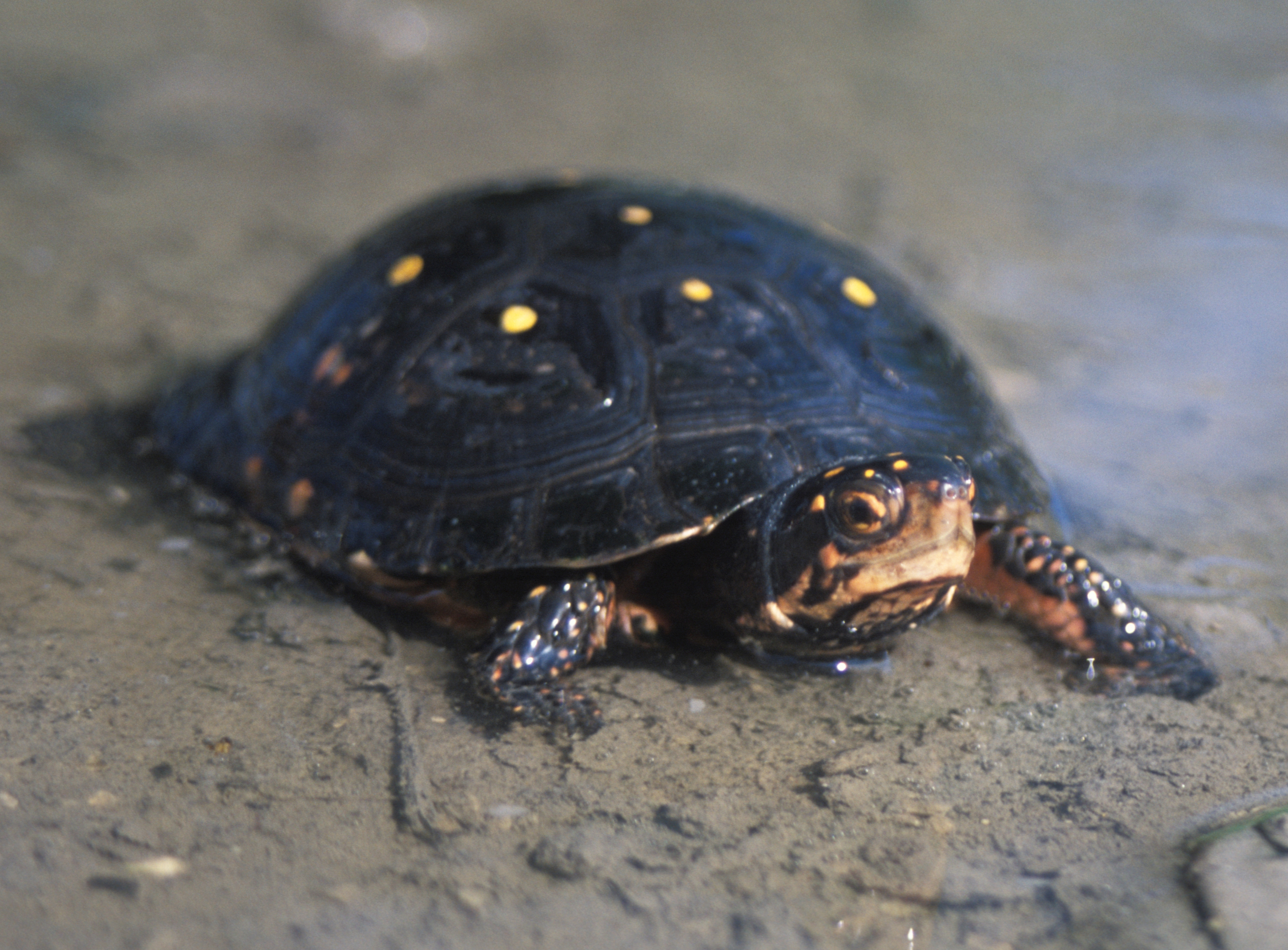
The spotted turtle is a threatened species in Michigan.

There are eleven species and subspecies of threatened reptiles in Michigan. Of these, six are listed as species of special concern, three as threatened and two as endangered. One species has federal listed status as threatened, while another is a candidate for federal listing.

Species	Common name	State status	Federal status
Clemmys guttata	Spotted turtle	Threatened	
Clemmys insculpta	Wood turtle	Special concern	
Clonophis kirtlandii	Kirtland's snake	Endangered	
Cnemidophorus sexlineatus	Six-lined racerunner	Threatened	
Emys blandingii	Blanding's turtle	Special concern	
Nerodia erythrogaster neglecta	Copperbelly water snake	Endangered	Threatened
Pantherophis gloydi	Eastern fox snake	Threatened	
Pantherophis alleghaniensis	Central ratsnake	Special concern	
Regina septemvittata	Queen snake	Special concern	
Sistrurus catenatus catenatus	Eastern massasauga	Special concern	Candidate
Terrapene carolina carolina	Eastern box turtle	Special concern	

== Birds ==
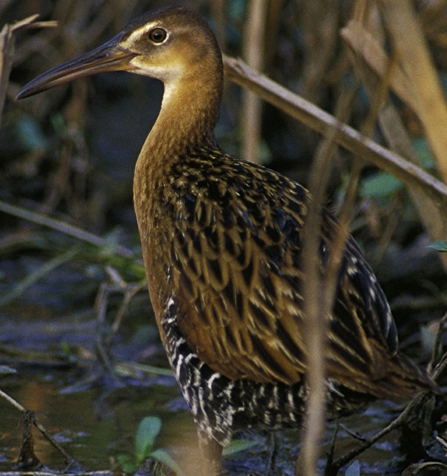
The king rail, endangered in Michigan

There are 42 threatened species and subspecies of birds in Michigan. Of these, 18 are listed as species of special concern, 14 as threatened and 9 as endangered. One additional species is listed as extinct in Michigan, although it previously had a population in the state. Two species have federal listed status as endangered.

Species	Common name	State status	Federal status
Astur atricapillus	American goshawk	Special concern	
Ammodramus henslowii	Henslow's sparrow	Endangered	
Ammodramus savannarum	Grasshopper sparrow	Special concern	
Asio flammeus	Short-eared owl	Endangered	
Asio otus	Long-eared owl	Threatened	
Botaurus lentiginosus	American bittern	Special concern	
Buteo lineatus	Red-shouldered hawk	Threatened	
Charadrius melodus	Piping plover	Endangered	Endangered and critical habitat (Note: Under the definition of the Endangered Species Act, a critical habitat is a geographic location which provides a feature, such as breeding habitat, nutritional or physiological requirements, or shelter, that is required for the survival of a threatened or endangered species.)
Chlidonias niger	Black tern	Special concern	
Chondestes grammacus	Lark sparrow	Extinct	
Circus cyaneus	Northern harrier	Special concern	
Cistothorus palustris	Marsh wren	Special concern	
Coturnicops noveboracensis	Yellow rail	Threatened	
Cygnus buccinator	Trumpeter swan	Threatened	
Falcipennis canadensis	Spruce grouse	Special concern	
Falco columbarius	Merlin	Threatened	
Falco peregrinus	Peregrine falcon	Endangered	
Gallinula chloropus	Common moorhen	Threatened	
Gavia immer	Common loon	Threatened	
Haliaeetus leucocephalus	Bald eagle	Special concern	
Hydroprogne caspia	Caspian tern	Threatened	
Ixobrychus exilis	Least bittern	Threatened	
Lanius ludovicianus migrans	Migrant loggerhead shrike	Endangered	
Nycticorax nycticorax	Black-crowned night-heron	Special concern	
Pandion haliaetus	Osprey	Special concern	
Parkesia motacilla	Louisiana waterthrush	Threatened	
Phalaropus tricolor	Wilson's phalarope	Special concern	
Picoides arcticus	Black-backed woodpecker	Special concern	
Protonotaria citrea	Prothonotary warbler	Special concern	
Rallus elegans	King rail	Endangered	
Setophaga cerulea	Cerulean warbler	Threatened	
Setophaga citrina	Hooded warbler	Special concern	
Setophaga discolor	Prairie warbler	Endangered	
Setophaga dominica	Yellow-throated warbler	Threatened	
Setophaga kirtlandii	Kirtland's warbler	Endangered	Endangered
Spiza americana	Dickcissel	Special concern	
Sterna forsteri	Forster's tern	Threatened	
Sterna hirundo	Common tern	Threatened	
Sturnella neglecta	Western meadowlark	Special concern	
Tympanuchus phasianellus	Sharp-tailed grouse	Special concern	
Tyto furcata	American barn owl	Endangered	
Xanthocephalus xanthocephalus	Yellow-headed blackbird	Special concern	

== Fish ==
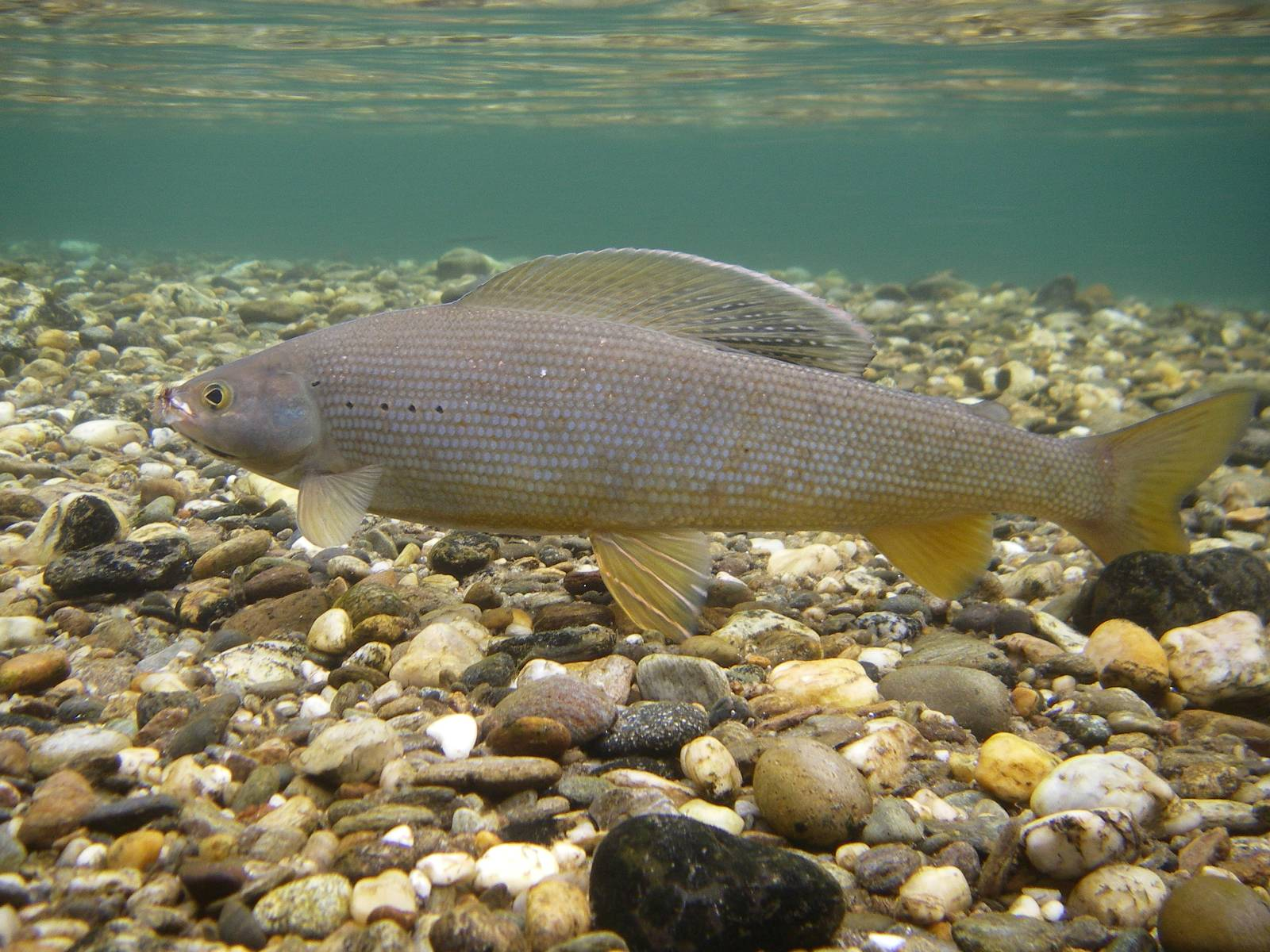
The Arctic grayling, a species now extinct in Michigan

There are 35 species and subspecies of threatened fish in Michigan. Of these, eight are species of special concern, nine are threatened and another nine are listed as endangered. An additional nine species that previously had populations in Michigan are now considered extinct in that state. None of the federally listed species of threatened fish have populations in Michigan.

Species	Common name	State status
Acipenser fulvescens	Lake sturgeon	Threatened
Ammocrypta pellucida	Eastern sand darter	Threatened
Clinostomus elongatus	Redside dace	Endangered
Coregonus artedi	Lake herring	Threatened
Coregonus hubbsi	Ives Lake cisco	Threatened
Coregonus johannae	Deepwater cisco	Extinct
Coregonus kiyi	Kiyi	Special concern
Coregonus nigripinnis	Blackfin cisco	Extinct
Coregonus reighardi	Shortnose cisco	Extinct
Coregonus zenithicus	Shortjaw cisco	Threatened
Coregonus zenithicus bartletti	Siskiwit lake cisco	Threatened
Cottus ricei	Spoonhead sculpin	Special concern
Erimyzon oblongus	Creek chubsucker	Endangered
Etheostoma spectabile	Orangethroat darter	Special concern
Fundulus dispar	Starhead topminnow	Special concern
Hiodon tergisus	Mooneye	Threatened
Hybopsis amblops	Bigeye chub	Extinct
Lepisosteus oculatus	Spotted gar	Special concern
Macrhybopsis storeriana	Silver chub	Special concern
Moxostoma carinatum	River redhorse	Threatened
Notropis anogenus	Pugnose shiner	Endangered
Notropis chalybaeus	Ironcolor shiner	Extinct
Notropis dorsalis	Bigmouth shiner	Special concern
Noturus miurus	Brindled madtom	Special concern
Notropis photogenis	Silver shiner	Endangered
Notropis texanus	Weed shiner	Extinct
Noturus stigmosus	Northern madtom	Endangered
Opsopoeodus emiliae	Pugnose minnow	Endangered
Percina copelandi	Channel darter	Endangered
Percina shumardi	River darter	Endangered
Phoxinus erythrogaster	Southern redbelly dace	Endangered
Polyodon spathula	Paddlefish	Extinct
Sander canadensis	Sauger	Threatened
Sander vitreus glaucus	Bluepike	Extinct
Thymallus arcticus	Arctic grayling	Extinct

== Insects ==
=== Butterflies and moths ===
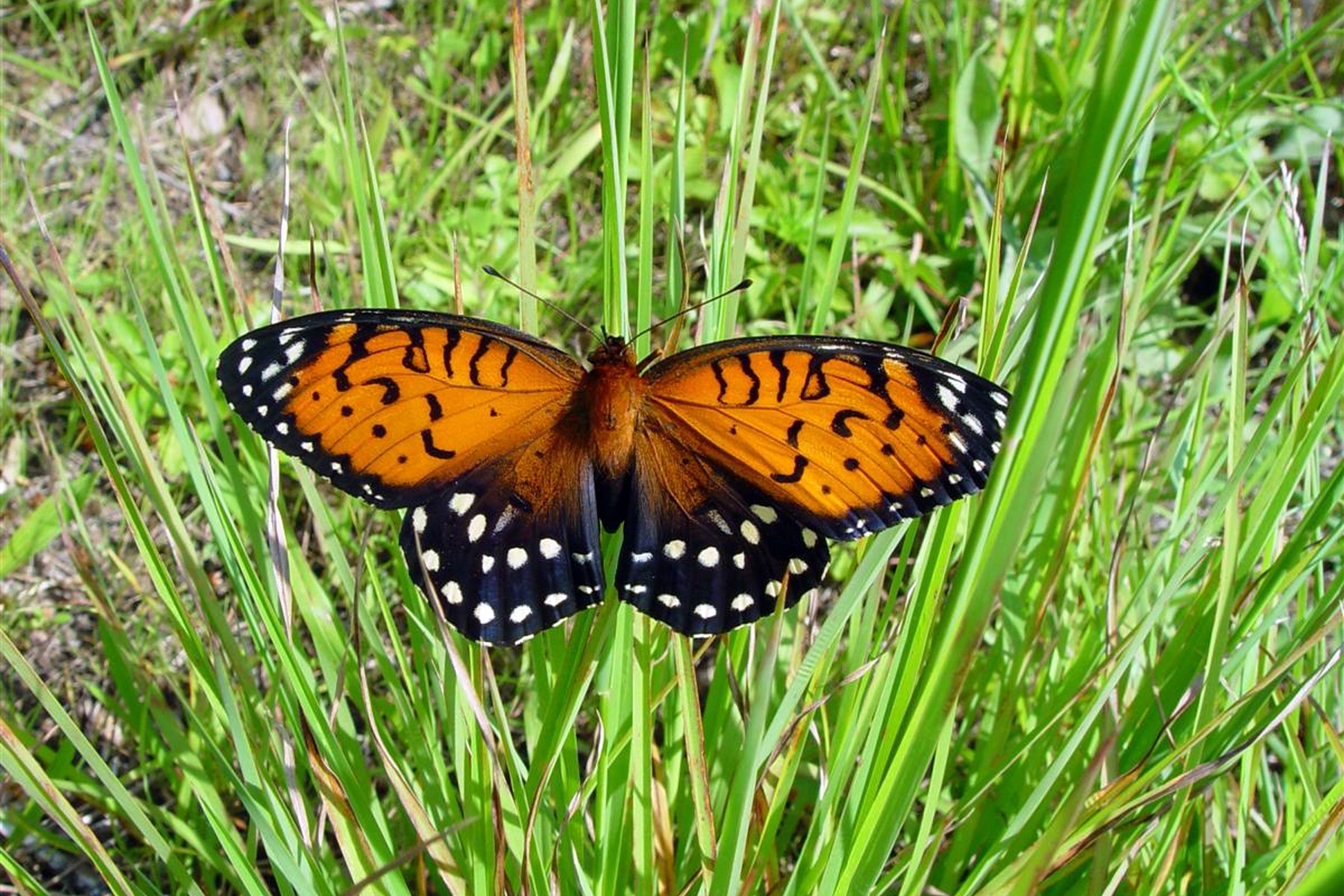
The regal fritillary is endangered in Michigan.

There are 53 species and subspecies of threatened butterflies and moths in Michigan. Of these, 40 are listed as species of special concern, 8 as threatened and 5 as endangered. Two species are also listed as federally endangered, while another is a candidate for federal listing.

Species	Common name	State status	Federal status
Acronicta falcula	Corylus dagger moth	Special concern	
Atrytonopsis hianna	Dusted skipper	Special concern	
Basilodes pepita	Gold moth	Special concern	
Battus philenor	Pipevine swallowtail	Special concern	
Boloria freija	Freija fritillary	Special concern	
Boloria frigga	Frigga fritillary	Special concern	
Brachionycha borealis	Boreal brachionyncha	Special concern	
Calephelis mutica	Swamp metalmark	Special concern	
Catocala amestris	Three-staff underwing	Endangered	
Catocala dulciola	Quiet underwing	Special concern	
Catocala illecta	Magdalen underwing	Special concern	
Catocala robinsoni	Robinson's underwing	Special concern	
Chlosyne gorgone carlota	Gorgone checkerspot	Special concern	
Eacles imperialis pini	Pine imperial moth	Special concern	
Erebia discoidalis	Red-disked alpine	Special concern	
Erora laeta	Early hairstreak	Special concern	
Erynnis baptisiae	Wild indigo duskywing	Special concern	
Erynnis persius persius	Persius duskywing	Threatened	
Euchloe ausonides	Large marble	Special concern	
Euphyes dukesi	Dukes' skipper	Threatened	
Euxoa aurulenta	Dune cutworm	Special concern	
Fixsenia favonius ontario	Northern hairstreak	Special concern	
Hemileuca maia	Barrens buckmoth	Special concern	
Hesperia ottoe	Ottoe skipper	Threatened	
Heterocampa subrotata	Small heterocampa	Special concern	
Heteropacha rileyana	Riley's lappet moth	Special concern	
Incisalia henrici	Henry's elfin	Threatened	
Incisalia irus	Frosted elfin	Threatened	
Merolonche dolli	Doll's merolonche	Special concern	
Meropleon ambifusca	Newman's brocade	Special concern	
Neonympha mitchellii mitchellii	Mitchell's satyr	Endangered	Endangered
Oarisma poweshiek	Poweshiek skipperling	Threatened	Candidate
Oeneis macounii	Macoun's arctic	Special concern	
Oncocnemis piffardi	Three-striped oncocnemis	Special concern	
Pachypolia atricornis	Three-horned moth	Special concern	
Papaipema aweme	Aweme borer	Special concern	
Papaipema beeriana	Blazing star borer	Special concern	
Papaipema cerina	Golden borer	Special concern	
Papaipema maritima	Maritime sunflower borer	Special concern	
Papaipema sciata	Culvers root borer	Special concern	
Papaipema silphii	Silphium borer moth	Threatened	
Papaipema speciosissima	Regal fern borer	Special concern	
Phyciodes batesii	Tawny crescent	Special concern	
Plebejus idas nabokovi	Northern blue	Threatened	
Plebejus melissa samuelis	Karner blue	Threatened	Endangered
Polygonia gracilis	Hoary comma	Special concern	
Proserpinus flavofasciata	Yellow-banded day-sphinx	Special concern	
Pygarctia spraguei	Sprague's pygarctia	Special concern	
Pyrgus wyandot	Grizzled skipper	Special concern	
Schinia indiana	Phlox moth	Endangered	
Schinia lucens	Leadplant flower moth	Endangered	
Spartiniphaga inops	Spartina moth	Special concern	
Speyeria idalia	Regal fritillary	Endangered	

=== Beetles ===
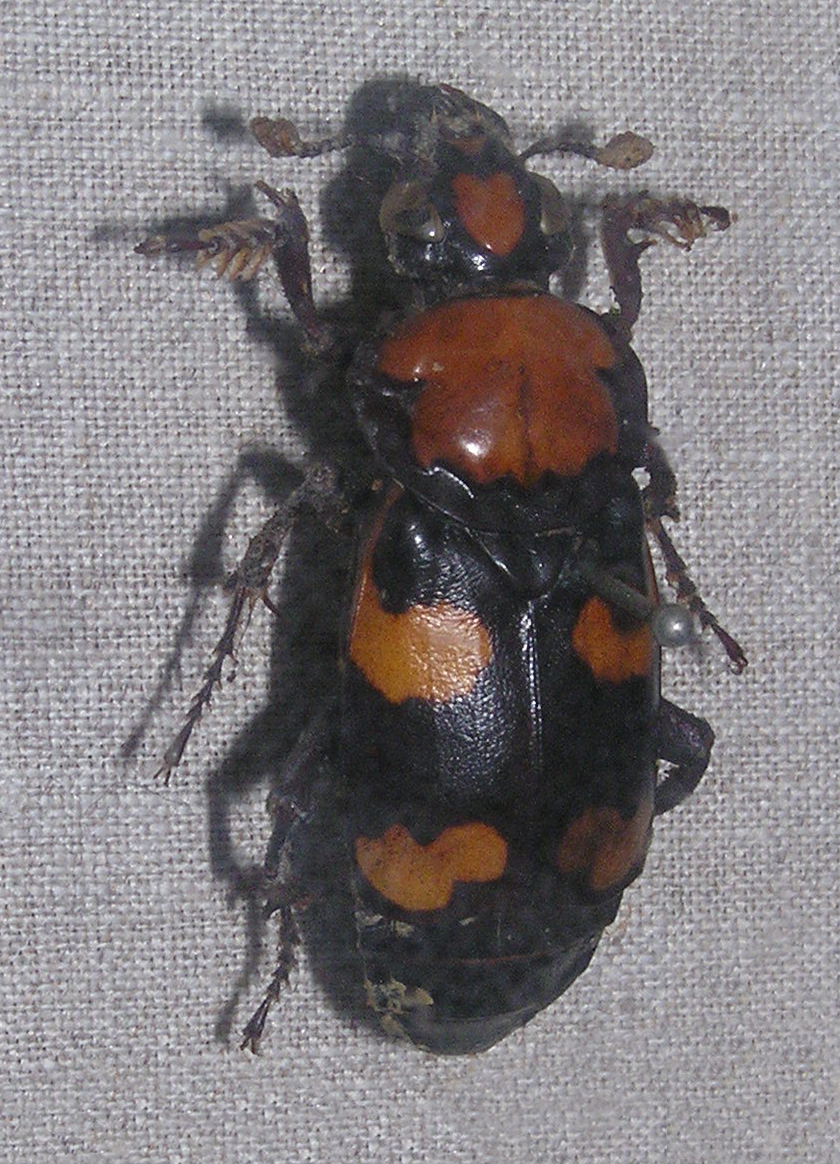
The American burying beetle, extinct in Michigan and listed as endangered in the United States

There are six species of threatened beetles in Michigan. Of these, three are species of special concern, one is threatened and one is endangered. One additional species is extinct in Michigan, although it previously had a viable population in the state. Two species of beetles with populations in Michigan are listed as federally endangered.

Species	Common name	State status	Federal status
Brychius hungerfordi	Hungerford's crawling water beetle	Endangered	Endangered
Dryobius sexnotatus	Six-banded longhorn beetle	Threatened	
Liodessus cantralli	Cantrall's bog beetle	Special concern	
Lordithon niger	Black lordithon rove beetle	Special concern	
Nicrophorus americanus	American burying beetle	Extinct	Endangered
Stenelmis douglasensis	Douglas Stenelmis riffle beetle	Special concern	

=== Cicadas and hoppers ===
There are seven species of threatened cicadas and hoppers with populations in Michigan. Of these, five are listed as species of special concern and two as threatened species. There are no federally listed species with populations in Michigan.

Species	Common name	State status
Dorydiella kansana	Leafhopper	Special concern
Flexamia delongi	Leafhopper	Special concern
Flexamia huroni	Huron river leafhopper	Threatened
Flexamia reflexus	Leafhopper	Special concern
Lepyronia angulifera	Angular spittlebug	Special concern
Lepyronia gibbosa	Great plains spittlebug	Threatened
Prosapia ignipectus	Red-legged spittlebug	Special concern

=== Damselflies and dragonflies ===
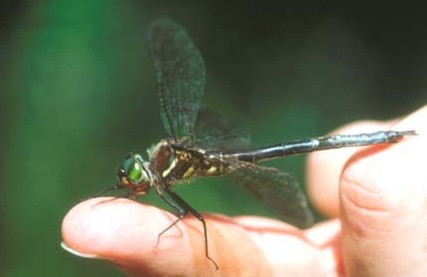
The Hine's emerald dragonfly, listed as endangered in both Michigan and the United States

There are 15 species of threatened damselflies and dragonflies in Michigan. Of these, twelve are listed as species of special concern, two as threatened and one as endangered. The state-listed endangered species is also listed as federally endangered.

Species	Common name	State status	Federal status
Cordulegaster erronea	Tiger spiketail	Special concern	
Gomphus lineatifrons	Splendid clubtail	Special concern	
Gomphus quadricolor	Rapids clubtail	Special concern	
Hetaerina titia	Smokey rubyspot	Special concern	
Ophiogomphus anomalus	Extra-striped snaketail	Special concern	
Ophiogomphus howei	Pygmy snaketail	Threatened	
Somatochlora hineana	Hine's emerald	Endangered	Endangered
Somatochlora incurvata	Incurvate emerald	Special concern	
Stylurus amnicola	Riverine snaketail	Special concern	
Stylurus laurae	Laura's snaketail	Special concern	
Stylurus notatus	Elusive snaketail	Special concern	
Stylurus plagiatus	Russet-tipped clubtail	Special concern	
Tachopteryx thoreyi	Grey petaltail	Threatened	
Williamsonia fletcheri	Ebony boghaunter	Special concern	
Williamsonia lintneri	Ringed boghaunter	Special concern	

=== Grasshoppers and crickets ===
There are 14 species of threatened grasshoppers and crickets in Michigan. Thirteen of these are listed as species of special concern, while the remaining species is listed as threatened. There are no federally listed species with populations in Michigan.

Species	Common name	State status
Appalachia arcana	Secretive locust	Special concern
Atlanticus davisi	Davis's shield-bearer	Special concern
Melanoplus flavidus	Blue-legged locust	Special concern
Neoconocephalus lyristes	Bog conehead	Special concern
Neoconocephalus retusus	Conehead grasshopper	Special concern
Oecanthus laricis	Tamarack tree cricket	Special concern
Oecanthus pini	Pinetree cricket	Special concern
Orchelimum concinnum	Red-faced meadow katydid	Special concern
Orchelimum delicatum	Delicate meadow katydid	Special concern
Orphulella pelidna	Green desert grasshopper	Special concern
Paroxya hoosieri	Hoosier locust	Special concern
Psinidia fenestralis	Atlantic-coast locust	Special concern
Scudderia fasciata	Pine katydid	Special concern
Trimerotropis huroniana	Lake Huron locust	Threatened

=== Bees ===
There are two species of threatened bees in Michigan, both of which are members of the genus Bombus and are listed as species of special concern. There are no federally listed bee species with populations in Michigan.

Species	Common name	State status
Bombus affinis	Rusty-patched bumble bee	Special concern
Bombus terricola	Yellow banded bumble bee	Special concern

=== Caddisflies ===
There is one species of threatened caddisfly in Michigan, which is listed as a species of special concern and is not found on the federal listing of endangered species.

Species	Common name	State status
Limnephilus pallens	No common name	Special concern

=== Dobsonflies and fishflies ===
There is one species of threatened dobsonfly in Michigan and no species of threatened fishflies. The single threatened member of this group is listed as a species of special concern, and is not found on the federal listing.

Species	Common name	State status
Neohermes concolor	No common name	Special concern

=== Mayflies ===
There are three species of threatened mayflies with populations in Michigan, all of which are listed as species of special concern. None are found on the federal listing.

Species	Common name	State status
Anthopotamus verticis	Walker's tusked sprawler	Special concern
Epeorus suffusus	No common name	Special concern
Habrophlebiodes americana	No common name	Special concern

== Freshwater mussels ==
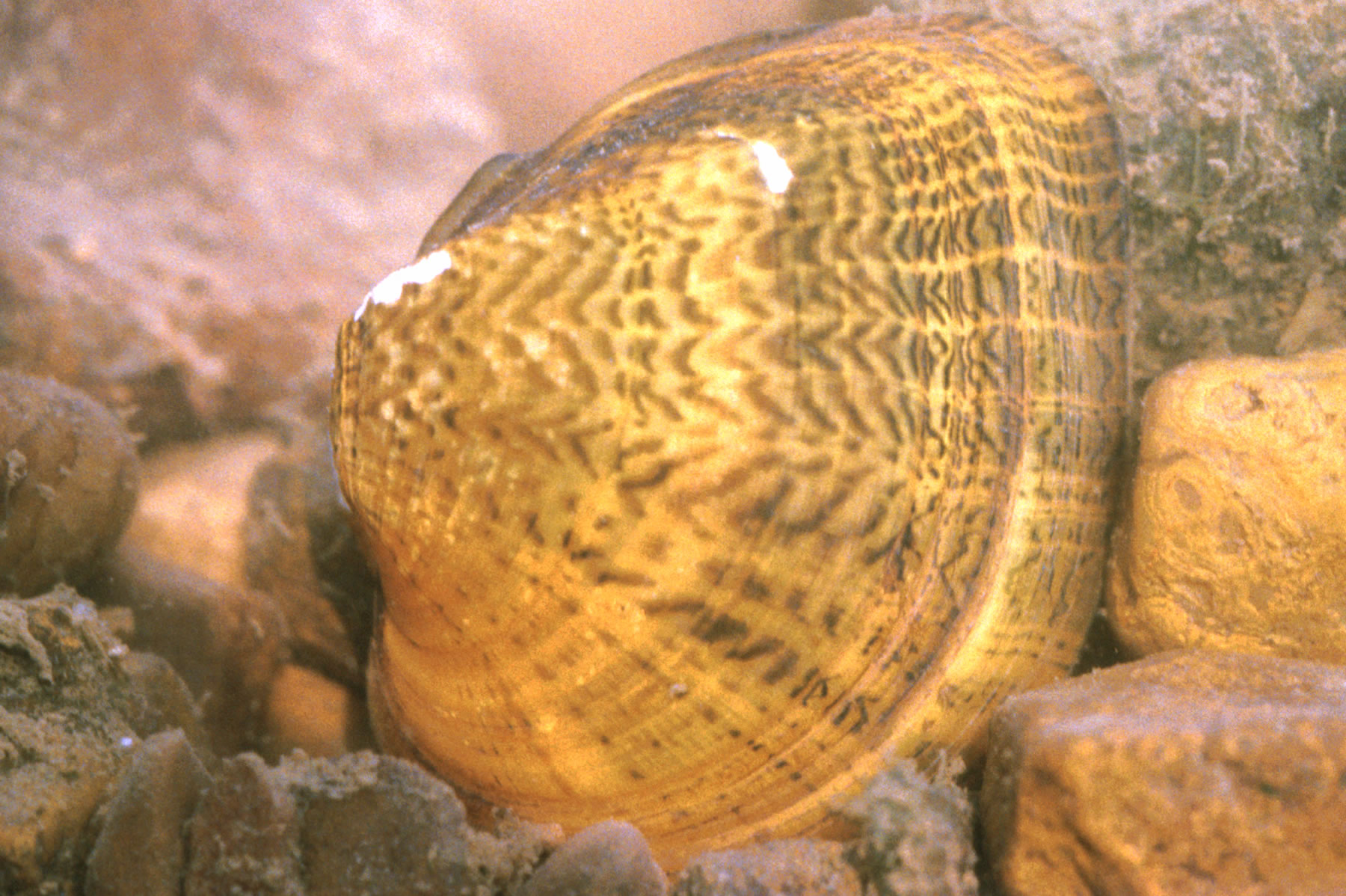
The deertoe mussel is a species of special concern in Michigan.

There are 28 species and subspecies of threatened freshwater mussels in Michigan. Of these, 9 are species of special concern, 6 are listed as threatened and 13 are endangered. Six are also federally listed as endangered.

Species	Common name	State status	Federal status
Alasmidonta marginata	Elktoe	Special concern	
Alasmidonta viridis	Slippershell mussel	Threatened	
Cyclonaias tuberculata	Purple wartyback	Threatened	
Epioblasma obliquata perobliqua	White catspaw	Endangered	Endangered
Epioblasma torulosa rangiana	Northern riffleshell	Endangered	Endangered
Epioblasma triquetra	Snuffbox	Endangered	Endangered
Lampsilis fasciola	Wavy-rayed lampmussel	Threatened	
Leptodea leptodon	Scaleshell	Special concern	Endangered
Ligumia nasuta	Eastern pondmussel	Endangered	
Ligumia recta	Black sandshell	Endangered	
Obliquaria reflexa	Threehorn wartyback	Endangered	
Obovaria olivaria	Hickorynut	Endangered	
Obovaria subrotunda	Round hickorynut	Endangered	
Pleurobema clava	Clubshell	Endangered	Endangered
Pleurobema sintoxia	Round pigtoe	Special concern	
Potamilus ohiensis	Pink papershell	Threatened	
Ptychobranchus fasciolaris	Kidney shell	Special concern	
Pyganodon lacustris	Lake floater	Special concern	
Pyganodon subgibbosa	Round lake floater	Threatened	
Simpsonaias ambigua	Salamander mussel	Endangered	
Toxolasma lividus	Purple lilliput	Endangered	
Toxolasma parvus	lilliput	Endangered	
Truncilla donaciformis	Fawnsfoot	Threatened	
Truncilla truncata	Deertoe	Special concern	
Utterbackia imbecillis	Paper pondshell	Special concern	
Venustaconcha ellipsiformis	Ellipse	Special concern	
Villosa fabalis	Rayed bean	Endangered	Endangered
Villosa iris	Rainbow	Special concern	

== Land and freshwater snails ==
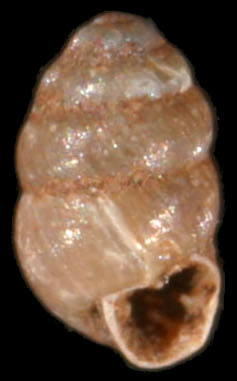
The shell of a crested vertigo, a species of special concern in Michigan

There are 61 species and subspecies of threatened land and freshwater snails in Michigan. Of these, 38 are species of special concern, 10 are listed as threatened and 13 are listed as endangered. No federally listed species of snails have populations in Michigan.

Species	Common name	State status
Acella haldemani	Spindle lymnaea	Special concern
Anguispira kochi	Banded globe	Special concern
Appalachina sayana	Spike-lip crater	Special concern
Birgella subglobosus	Globe siltsnail	Special concern
Carychium nannodes	File thorn	Special concern
Catinella exile	Pleistocene catinella	Threatened
Catinella gelida	No common name	Threatened
Catinella protracta	No common name	Endangered
Cincinnatia cincinnatiensis	Campeloma spire snail	Special concern
Discus patulus	Domed disc	Special concern
Euchemotrema hubrichti	Carinate pillsnail	Threatened
Euconulus alderi	No common name	Threatened
Fontigens nickliniana	Watercress snail	Special concern
Fossaria cyclostoma	Bugle fossaria	Threatened
Fossaria galbana	Boreal fossaria	Special concern
Gastrocopta holzingeri	Lambda snaggletooth snail	Endangered
Glyphyalinia solida	No common name	Special concern
Guppya sterkii	Sterki's granule	Endangered
Hawaiia alachuana	Southeastern gem	Special concern
Helicodiscus singleyanus	Smooth coil	Special concern
Helisoma anceps royalense	Lake Superior ramshorn	Special concern
Hendersonia occulta	Cherrystone drop	Threatened
Lyogyrus walkeri	Canadian duskysnail	Special concern
Mesodon clausus	Yellow globelet	Special concern
Mesodon elevatus	Proud globe	Threatened
Mesodon mitchellianus	Sealed globelet	Special concern
Mesodon pennsylvanicus	Proud globelet	Special concern
Mesomphix cupreus	Copper button	Special concern
Oxyloma peoriense	Depressed ambersnail	Special concern
Pallifera fosteri	Foster mantleslug	Threatened
Philomycus carolinianus	Carolina Mantleslug	Special concern
Physella magnalacustris	Great Lakes physa	Special concern
Physella parkeri	Broadshoulder physa	Threatened
Planogyra asteriscus	Eastern flat-whorl	Special concern
Planorbella multivolvis	Acorn ramshorn	Endangered
Planorbella smithi	No common name	Endangered
Pomatiopsis cincinnatiensis	Brown walker	Special concern
Pupilla muscorum	Widespread column	Special concern
Pyrgulopsis letsoni	Gravel pyrg	Special concern
Stagnicola contracta	Deepwater pondsnail	Endangered
Stagnicola petoskeyensis	Petoskey pondsnail	Endangered
Stagnicola woodruffi	Coldwater pondsnail	Special concern
Striatura meridionalis	Median striate	Special concern
Vallonia gracilicosta albula	No common name	Endangered
Vallonia parvula	Trumpet vallonia	Special concern
Valvata perdepressa	Purplecap valvata	Special concern
Valvata winnebagoensis	Flanged valvata	Special concern
Ventridens intertextus	Pyramid dome	Special concern
Ventridens suppressus	Flat dome	Special concern
Vertigo bollesiana	Delicate vertigo	Threatened
Vertigo cristata	Crested vertigo	Special concern
Vertigo elatior	Tapered vertigo	Special concern
Vertigo hubrichti	Hubricht's vertigo	Endangered
VVertigo modesta modesta	No common name	Endangered
Vertigo modesta parietalis	No common name	Endangered
Vertigo morsei	Six-whorl vertigo	Endangered
Vertigo nylanderi	Deep-throat vertigo	Endangered
Vertigo paradoxa	Mystery vertigo	Special concern
Vertigo pygmaea	Crested vertigo	Special concern
Vertigo tridentata	Honey vertigo	Special concern
Xolotrema denotata	Velvet wedge	Special concern

== Fingernail and pea clams ==
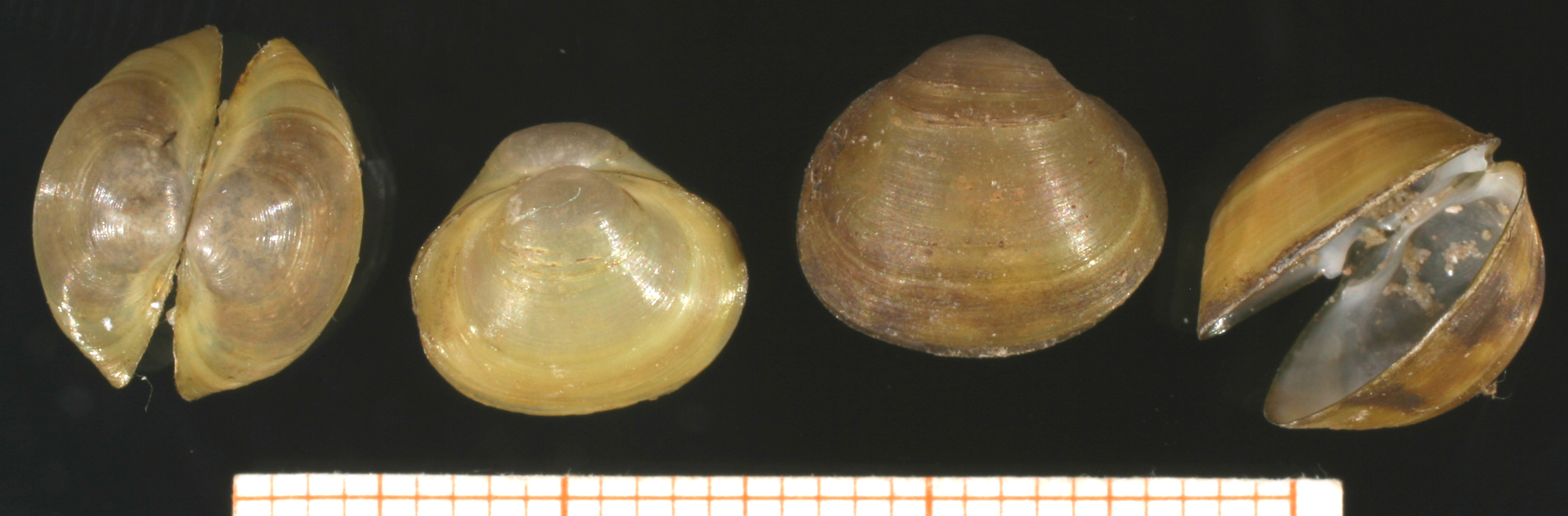
The European pea clam is a species of special concern in Michigan.

There are seven threatened species of fingernail and pea clams in Michigan, all listed as species of special concern. None of the species with populations in Michigan are federally listed as threatened.

Species	Common name	State status
Pisidium amnicum	Greater European pea clam	Special concern
Pisidium cruciatum	Ornamanted pea clam	Special concern
Pisidium equilaterale	Round pea clam	Special concern
Pisidium idahoense	Giant northern pea clam	Special concern
Pisidium simplex	No common name	Special concern
Sphaerium corneum	European pea clam	Special concern
Sphaerium fabale	River fingernail clam	Special concern

== See also ==
- List of fauna of Michigan
