= Scudderia fasciata =

Scientific classification
- Domain: Eukaryota
- Kingdom: Animalia
- Phylum: Arthropoda
- Class: Insecta
- Order: Orthoptera
- Suborder: Ensifera
- Family: Tettigoniidae
- Subfamily: Phaneropterinae
- Tribe: Scudderiini
- Genus: Scudderia
- Species: S. fasciata

Binomial name
- Scudderia fasciata Beutenmuller, 1894

Species of cricket-like animal

Scudderia fasciata, known generally as the treetop bush katydid or black-striped katydid, is a species of phaneropterine katydid in the family Tettigoniidae. It is found in North America.
