= Liodessus noviaffinis =

Scientific classification
- Kingdom: Animalia
- Phylum: Arthropoda
- Clade: Pancrustacea
- Class: Insecta
- Order: Coleoptera
- Suborder: Adephaga
- Family: Dytiscidae
- Genus: Liodessus
- Species: L. noviaffinis

Binomial name
- Liodessus noviaffinis K. B. Miller, 1998

Species of beetle

Liodessus noviaffinis is a species of predaceous diving beetle in the family Dytiscidae. It is found in North America. The species was formally described and classified by entomologist K.B. Miller in 1998. It was actually split from a closely related species, Liodessus affinis, during Miller's revision of the species group.
