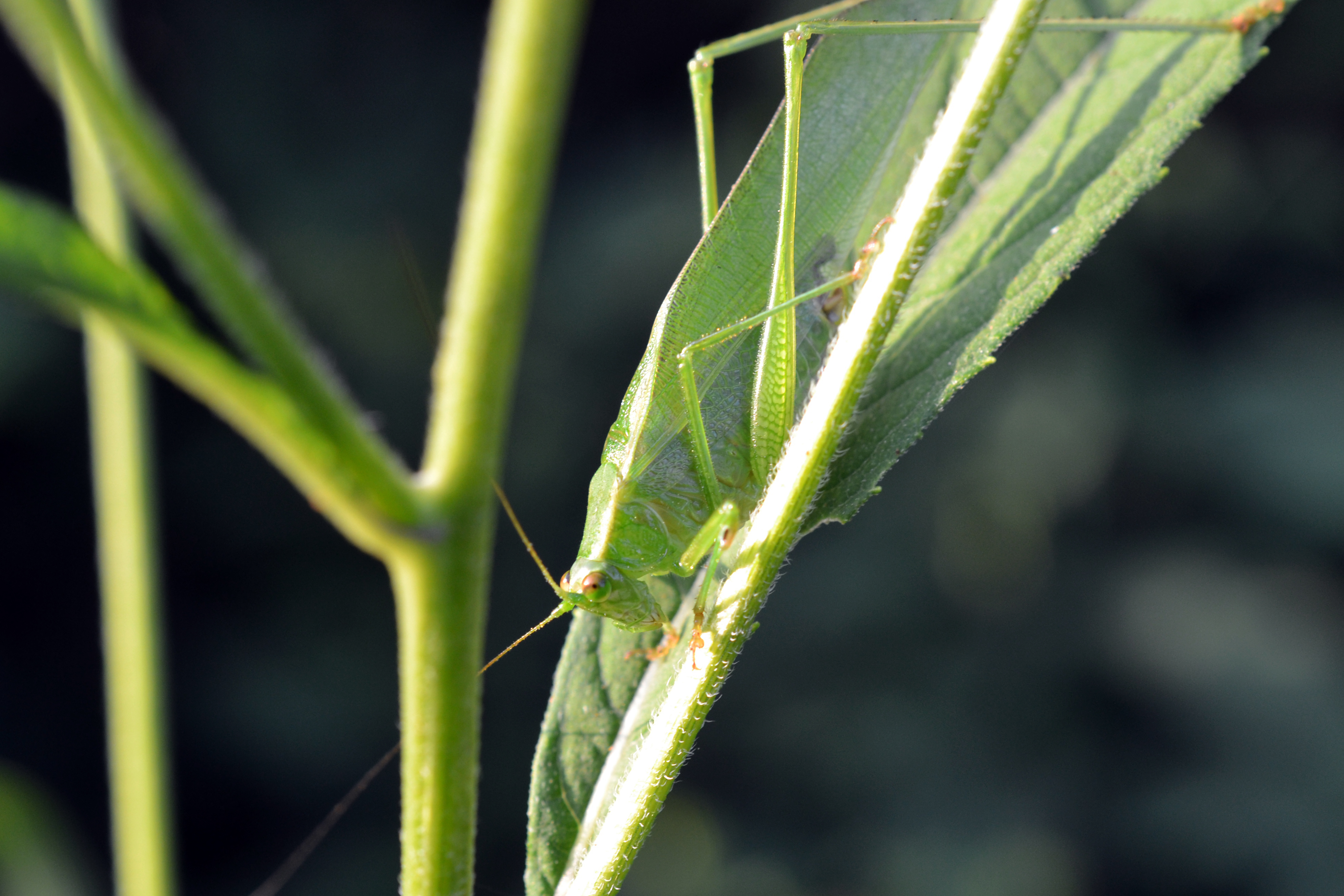

Scientific classification
- Domain: Eukaryota
- Kingdom: Animalia
- Phylum: Arthropoda
- Class: Insecta
- Order: Orthoptera
- Suborder: Ensifera
- Family: Tettigoniidae
- Subfamily: Phaneropterinae
- Genus: Scudderia
- Species: S. curvicauda

Binomial name
- Scudderia curvicauda (De Geer, 1773)

= Scudderia curvicauda =

Species of cricket-like animal

Scudderia curvicauda is a species of katydid in the family Tettigoniidae, within the order Orthoptera (grasshoppers, crickets, and katydids). A common name for Scudderia curvicauda is "curve-tailed bush katydid." Scudderia curvicauda is found in North America.
