= Neohermes angusticollis =

Scientific classification
- Domain: Eukaryota
- Kingdom: Animalia
- Phylum: Arthropoda
- Class: Insecta
- Order: Megaloptera
- Family: Corydalidae
- Genus: Neohermes
- Species: N. angusticollis

Binomial name
- Neohermes angusticollis (Hagen, 1861)

Species of insect

Neohermes angusticollis is a species of fishfly in the family Corydalidae. It is found in North America.
