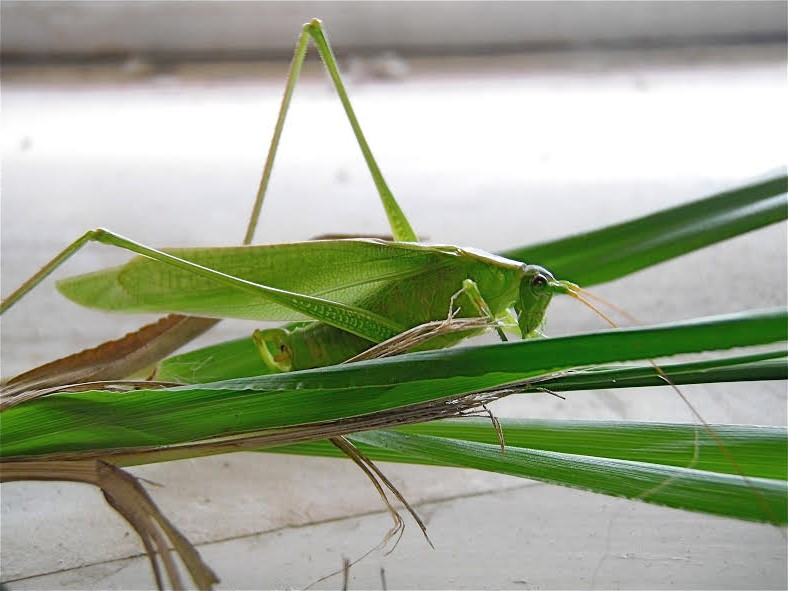

Scientific classification
- Domain: Eukaryota
- Kingdom: Animalia
- Phylum: Arthropoda
- Class: Insecta
- Order: Orthoptera
- Suborder: Ensifera
- Family: Tettigoniidae
- Subfamily: Phaneropterinae
- Genus: Scudderia
- Species: S. texensis

Binomial name
- Scudderia texensis Saussure and Pictet 1897

= Scudderia texensis =

Species of cricket-like animal

Scudderia texensis is a katydid commonly known as the Texas bush katydid.

== Description ==
The length of the species ranges from 40–56 mm. Much of the size variation is dependent on the geography. The female Texas bush katydids can be identified by the right angle between their basal and terminal portions of the ovipositor. In males, the sub-genital plate has an upcurved ventral process that meets a dorsal extension of the supra-anal plate. The dorsal process ends with a pair of curved indentations that define a small central tooth.

== Distribution and habitat ==
Scudderia texensis occurs throughout the eastern United States. It also occurs in adjacent Canada west to the western edge of the Great Plains. It inhabits areas of grasslands, deciduous forests, and shrublands. Of all species within the genus Scudderia, it is most abundant through the majority of its range. Adults are most numerous from late spring or summer into autumn often surviving until the first hard freezes. It is abundant in weedy old fields and roadsides.

== Ecology ==
In the south, two different generations of S. texensis are produced annually. The first matures in late spring, while the second generation matures in early fall. In the north, there is a single generation that matures in late summer. Size variation is dependent on geography, but also varies based on the number of generations and the length of the growing season. In the two generation portion of the range (from Florida to North Carolina), average size is 44 mm. The southern extreme for one generation is Virginia, and average size here is about 52 mm. The northern extreme, Michigan, has an average size of about 44 mm. Studies show that the size of adults is correlated with how fast the individuals must mature in order to fully use the growing season while producing the maximum number of generations.
