= Psinidia amplicornis =

Scientific classification
- Domain: Eukaryota
- Kingdom: Animalia
- Phylum: Arthropoda
- Class: Insecta
- Order: Orthoptera
- Suborder: Caelifera
- Family: Acrididae
- Genus: Psinidia
- Species: P. amplicornis

Binomial name
- Psinidia amplicornis Caudell, 1903

Species of grasshopper

Psinidia amplicornis, known generally as the Caudell's longhorn grasshopper or Texas longhorn grasshopper, is a species of band-winged grasshopper in the family Acrididae. It is found in North America.

== Distribution ==
The species is found predominantly in eastern Texas, USA replacing P. fenestralis west of Louisiana. Where the species meets P. fenestralis there may be some hybridisation and introgression and the species can therefore be hard identify in this area. They are also reported in the very north of Mexico, below the species distribution in Texas.
