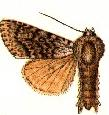
- Merolonche lupini

Scientific classification
- Kingdom: Animalia
- Phylum: Arthropoda
- Class: Insecta
- Order: Lepidoptera
- Superfamily: Noctuoidea
- Family: Noctuidae
- Subfamily: Acronictinae
- Genus: Merolonche; Grote, 1882

= Merolonche =

Genus of moths

Merolonche is a genus of moths of the family Noctuidae. The genus was erected by Augustus Radcliffe Grote in 1882.

== Species ==
- Merolonche australis Mustelin & Leuschner, 2000 California
- Merolonche dolli Barnes & McDunnough, 1918 New York
- Merolonche lupini (Grote, 1873) California, Colorado, British Columbia
- Merolonche spinea (Grote, 1876) California
