= Liodessus affinis =

Scientific classification
- Kingdom: Animalia
- Phylum: Arthropoda
- Clade: Pancrustacea
- Class: Insecta
- Order: Coleoptera
- Suborder: Adephaga
- Family: Dytiscidae
- Genus: Liodessus
- Species: L. affinis

Binomial name
- Liodessus affinis (Say, 1823)

Species of beetle

Liodessus affinis is a species of predaceous diving beetle in the family Dytiscidae. It is found in North America.
