= Acronicta mansueta =

Scientific classification
- Kingdom: Animalia
- Phylum: Arthropoda
- Clade: Pancrustacea
- Class: Insecta
- Order: Lepidoptera
- Superfamily: Noctuoidea
- Family: Noctuidae
- Genus: Acronicta
- Species: A. mansueta

Binomial name
- Acronicta mansueta Smith, 1897

Species of moth

Acronicta mansueta, the gentle dagger moth, is a moth of the family Noctuidae. The species was first described by John Bernhardt Smith in 1897. It was considered a synonym of Acronicta falcula, but was reinstated as a valid species in 2011. It is widespread in western North America, from southern Saskatchewan west to southern British Columbia, and south to at least Colorado and California.

The wingspan is 30–32 mm. Adults are on wing from June to September depending on the location.
