= Neohermes californicus =

Scientific classification
- Kingdom: Animalia
- Phylum: Arthropoda
- Clade: Pancrustacea
- Class: Insecta
- Order: Megaloptera
- Family: Corydalidae
- Genus: Neohermes
- Species: N. californicus

Binomial name
- Neohermes californicus (Walker, 1853)

Species of insect

Neohermes californicus is a species of fishfly in the family Corydalidae. It is found in North America.
