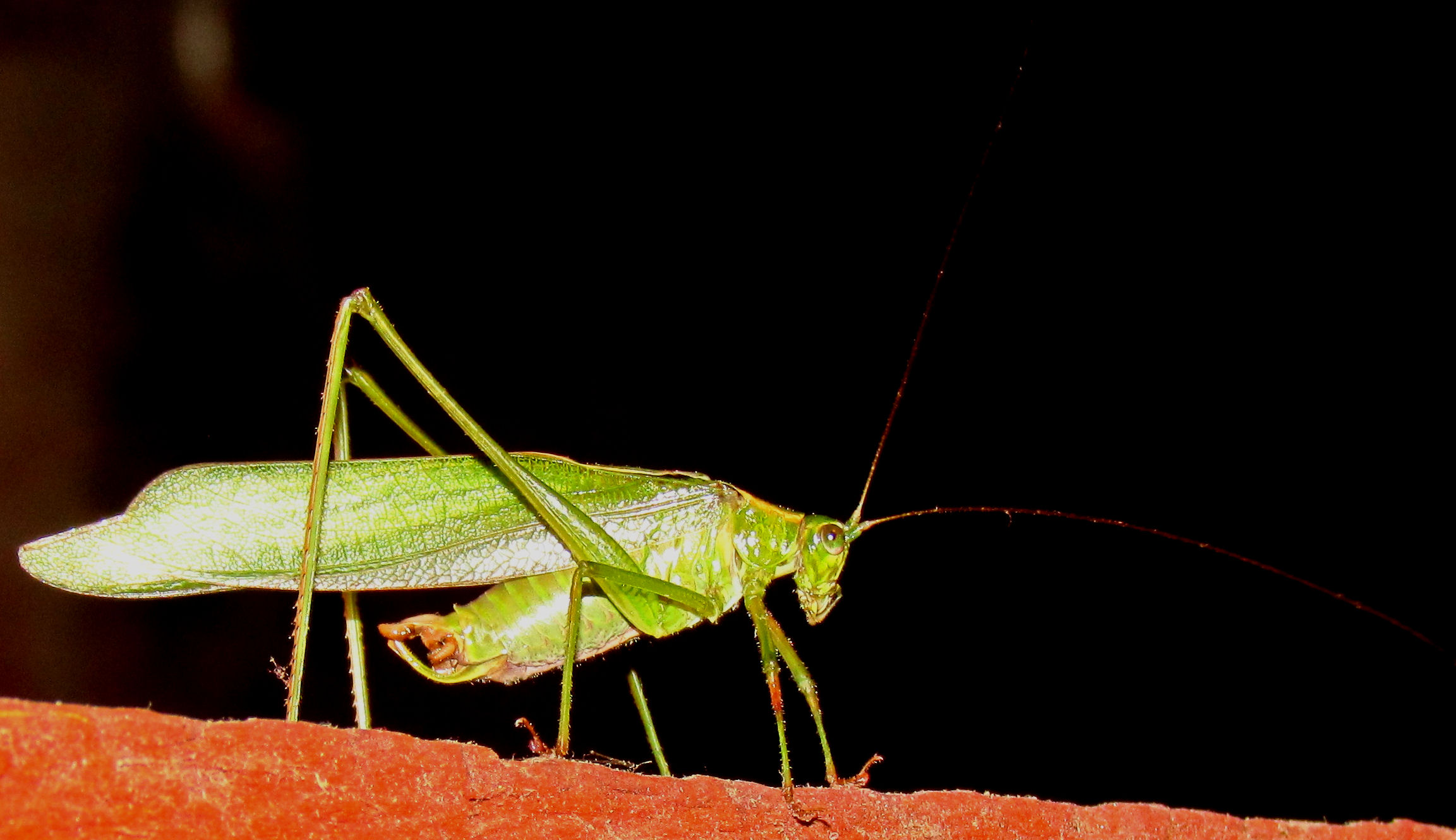

Scientific classification
- Kingdom: Animalia
- Phylum: Arthropoda
- Clade: Pancrustacea
- Class: Insecta
- Order: Orthoptera
- Suborder: Ensifera
- Family: Tettigoniidae
- Subfamily: Phaneropterinae
- Genus: Scudderia
- Species: S. pistillata

Binomial name
- Scudderia pistillata Brunner von Wattenwyl, 1878

= Scudderia pistillata =

Species of cricket-like animal

Scudderia pistillata is a species in the family Tettigoniidae ("katydids"), in the order Orthoptera ("grasshoppers, crickets, katydids"). A common name for Scudderia pistillata is "broad-winged bush katydid". Scudderia pistillata is found in North America.

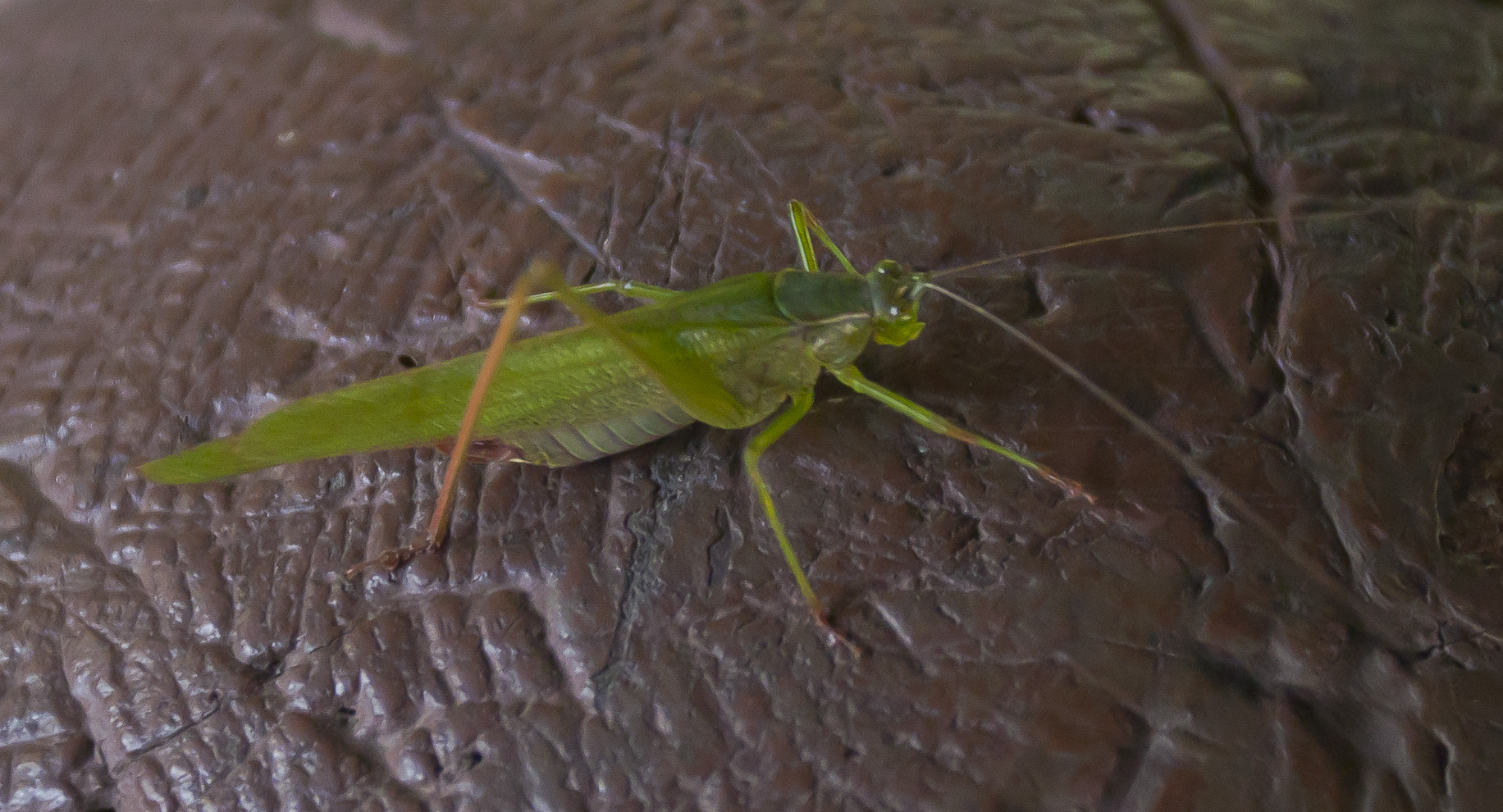
