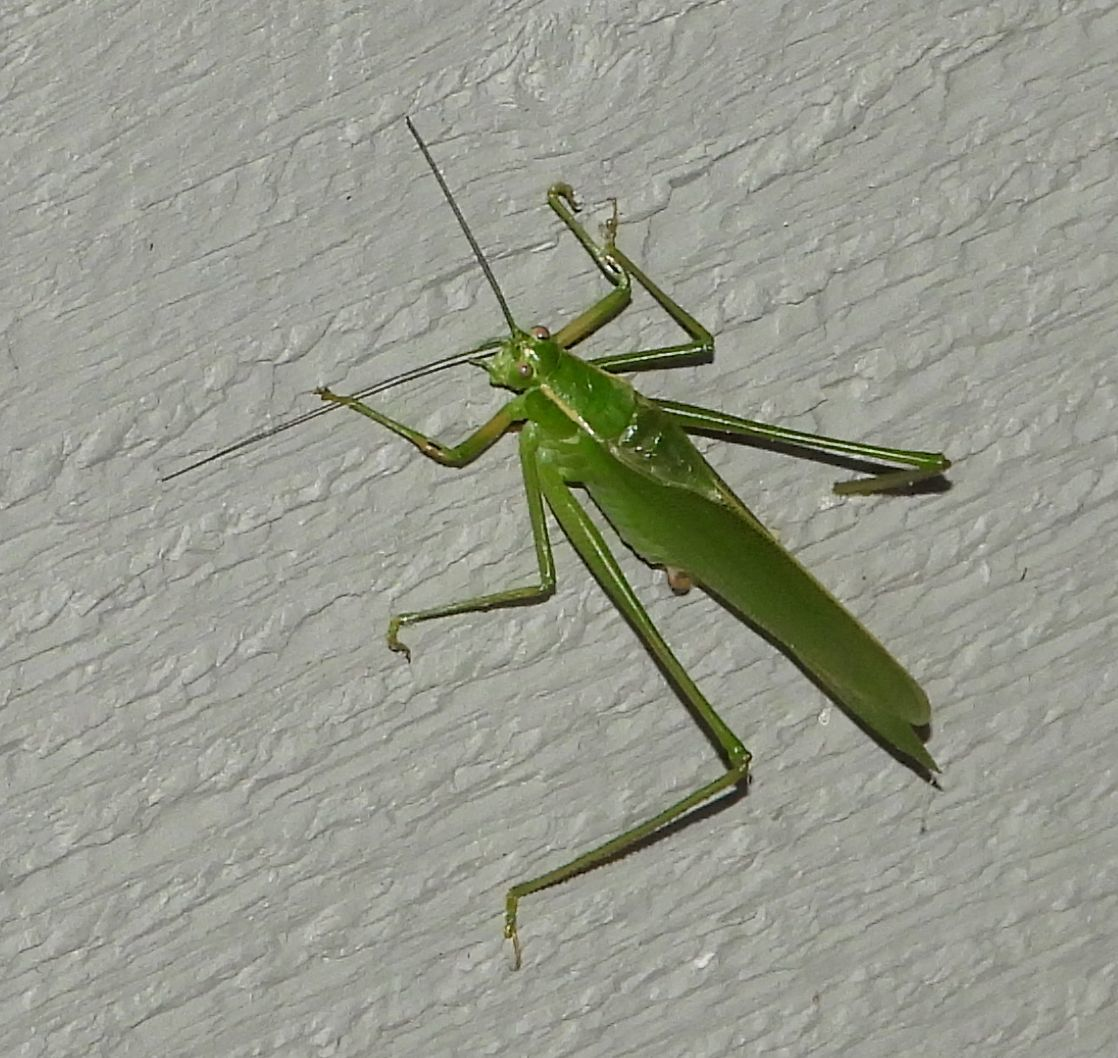

Scientific classification
- Domain: Eukaryota
- Kingdom: Animalia
- Phylum: Arthropoda
- Class: Insecta
- Order: Orthoptera
- Suborder: Ensifera
- Family: Tettigoniidae
- Subfamily: Phaneropterinae
- Tribe: Scudderiini
- Genus: Scudderia
- Species: S. septentrionalis

Binomial name
- Scudderia septentrionalis (Serville, 1839)

= Scudderia septentrionalis =

Species of cricket-like animal

Scudderia septentrionalis, the northern bush katydid, is a species of phaneropterine katydid in the family Tettigoniidae. It is found in North America.
