= Liodessus obscurellus =

Scientific classification
- Domain: Eukaryota
- Kingdom: Animalia
- Phylum: Arthropoda
- Class: Insecta
- Order: Coleoptera
- Suborder: Adephaga
- Family: Dytiscidae
- Genus: Liodessus
- Species: L. obscurellus

Binomial name
- Liodessus obscurellus (LeConte, 1852)

Synonyms
- Bidessus affinis erythrostomus (Mannerheim, 1852); Bidessus affinis macularis (LeConte, 1852); Bidessus affinis microreticulatus Hatch, 1928; Bidessus affinis nigrinus (Casey, 1884)

Species of beetle

Liodessus obscurellus is a species of predaceous diving beetle in the family Dytiscidae. It is found in North America and the Neotropics.
