= Liodessus crotchi =

Scientific classification
- Domain: Eukaryota
- Kingdom: Animalia
- Phylum: Arthropoda
- Class: Insecta
- Order: Coleoptera
- Suborder: Adephaga
- Family: Dytiscidae
- Genus: Liodessus
- Species: L. crotchi

Binomial name
- Liodessus crotchi Nilsson, 2001

Species of beetle

Liodessus crotchi is a species of predaceous diving beetle in the family Dytiscidae. It is found in North America.
