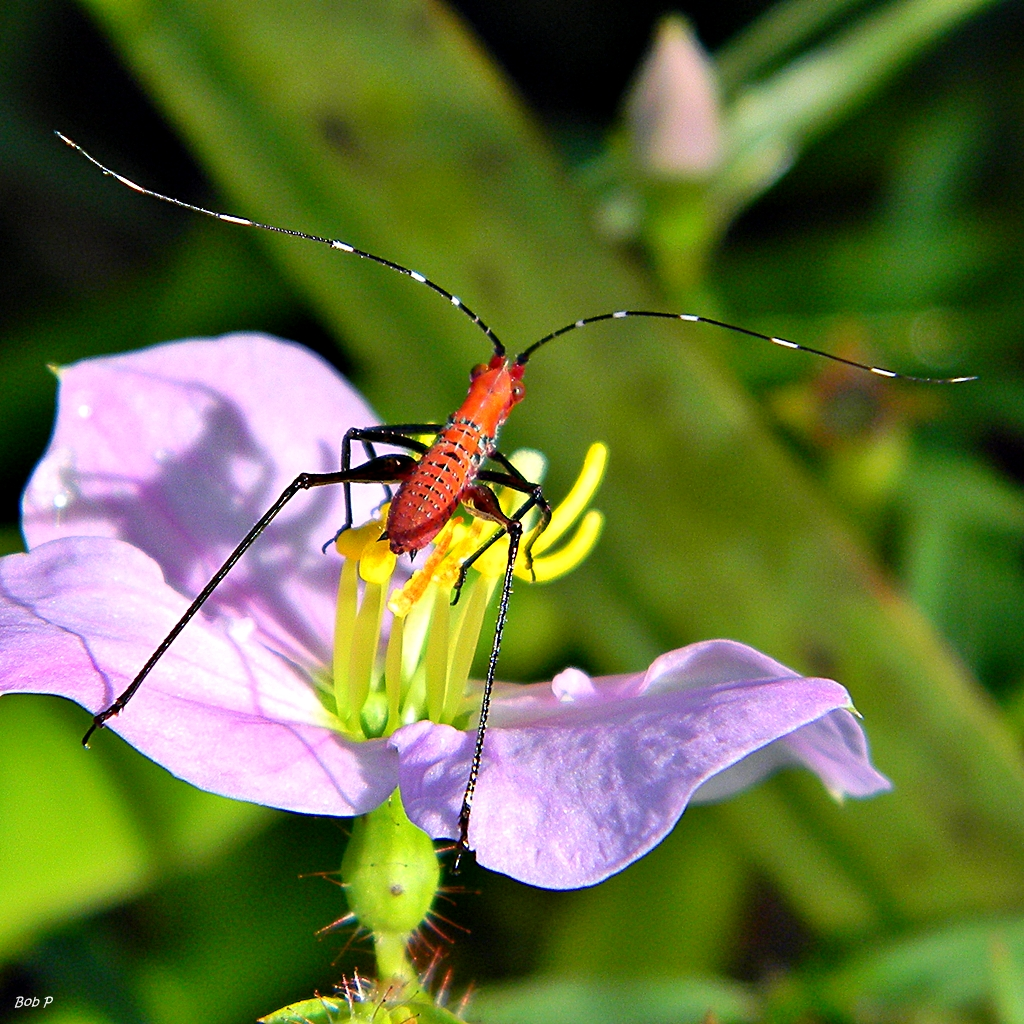

Scientific classification
- Domain: Eukaryota
- Kingdom: Animalia
- Phylum: Arthropoda
- Class: Insecta
- Order: Orthoptera
- Suborder: Ensifera
- Family: Tettigoniidae
- Subfamily: Phaneropterinae
- Genus: Scudderia
- Species: S. cuneata

Binomial name
- Scudderia cuneata Morse, 1901

= Scudderia cuneata =

Species of cricket-like animal

Scudderia cuneata, commonly known as the southeastern bush katydid, is a North American species of katydid in the family Tettigoniidae.
