= Liodessus cantralli =

Scientific classification
- Domain: Eukaryota
- Kingdom: Animalia
- Phylum: Arthropoda
- Class: Insecta
- Order: Coleoptera
- Suborder: Adephaga
- Family: Dytiscidae
- Genus: Liodessus
- Species: L. cantralli

Binomial name
- Liodessus cantralli (Young, 1953)

Species of beetle

Liodessus cantralli, or Cantrall's bog beetle, is a species of predaceous diving beetle in the family Dytiscidae. It is found in North America.
