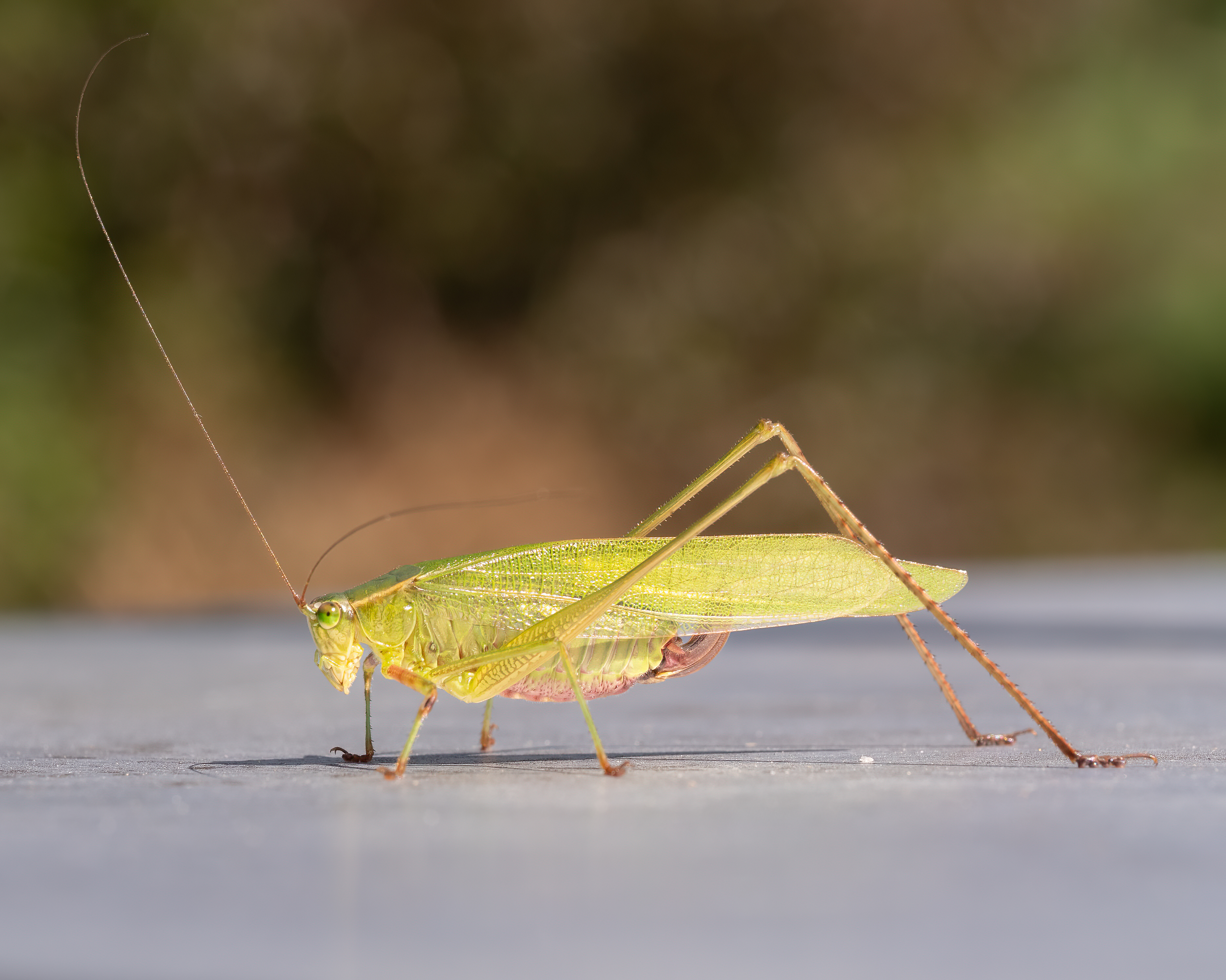
- Adult in Tennessee
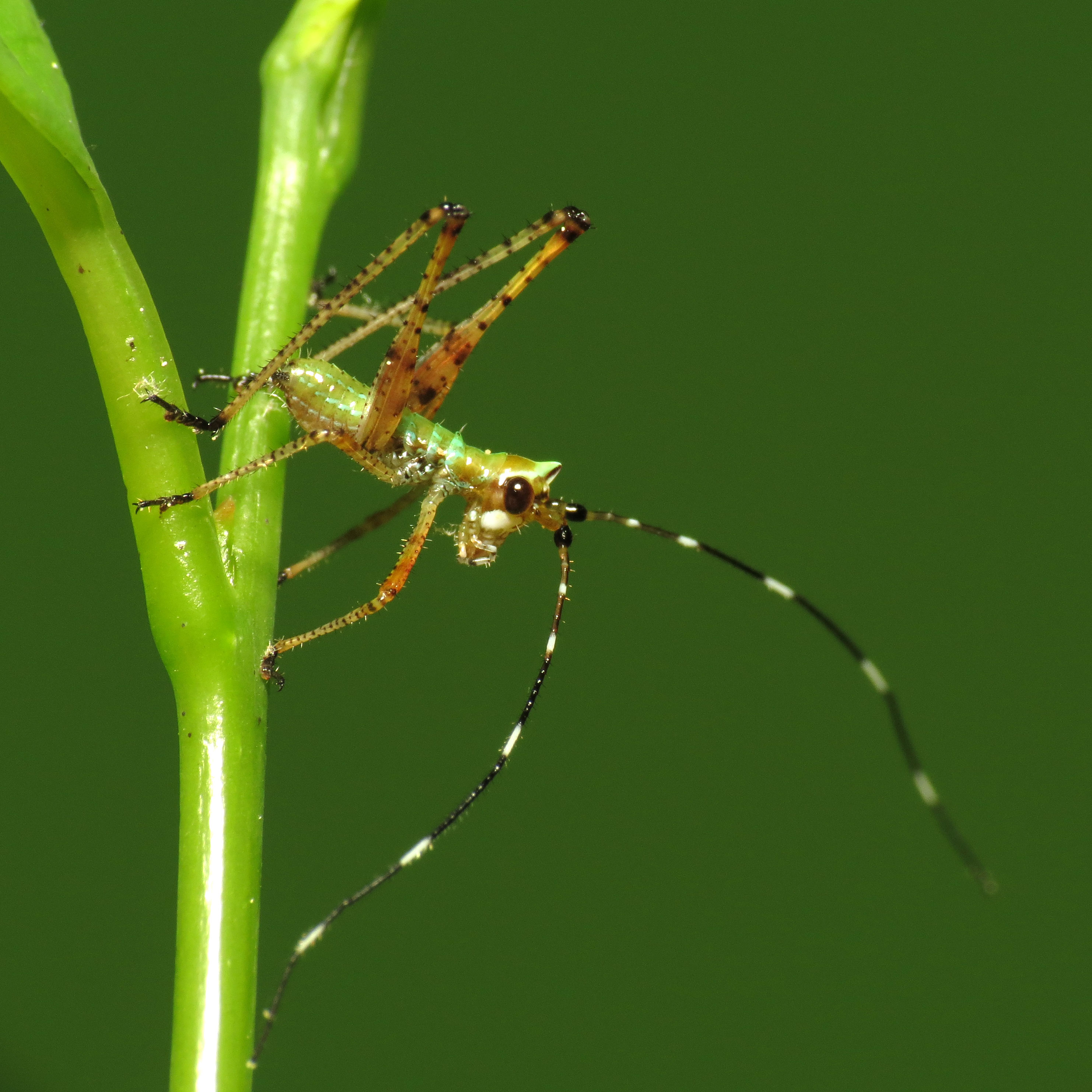
- Bush katydid nymph

Scientific classification
- Kingdom: Animalia
- Phylum: Arthropoda
- Clade: Pancrustacea
- Class: Insecta
- Order: Orthoptera
- Suborder: Ensifera
- Family: Tettigoniidae
- Subfamily: Phaneropterinae
- Genus: Scudderia
- Species: S. furcata

Binomial name
- Scudderia furcata Brunner, 1878

= Scudderia furcata =

Species of cricket-like animal

Scudderia furcata is a species in the family Tettigoniidae ("katydids"), in the order Orthoptera ("grasshoppers, crickets, katydids"). A common name for Scudderia furcata is fork-tailed bush katydid. The distribution range of Scudderia furcata includes North America.

== Interactions with humans ==
The nymphs of this species can be pests of citrus fruit. Nymphs will often bite each fruit only once before moving on to the next fruit. Because of this, a few S. furcata nymphs can damage a comparatively large number of fruits.

The injuries to the fruit usually heal, leaving only minor discoloration. The interior of the fruit is affected little if at all.

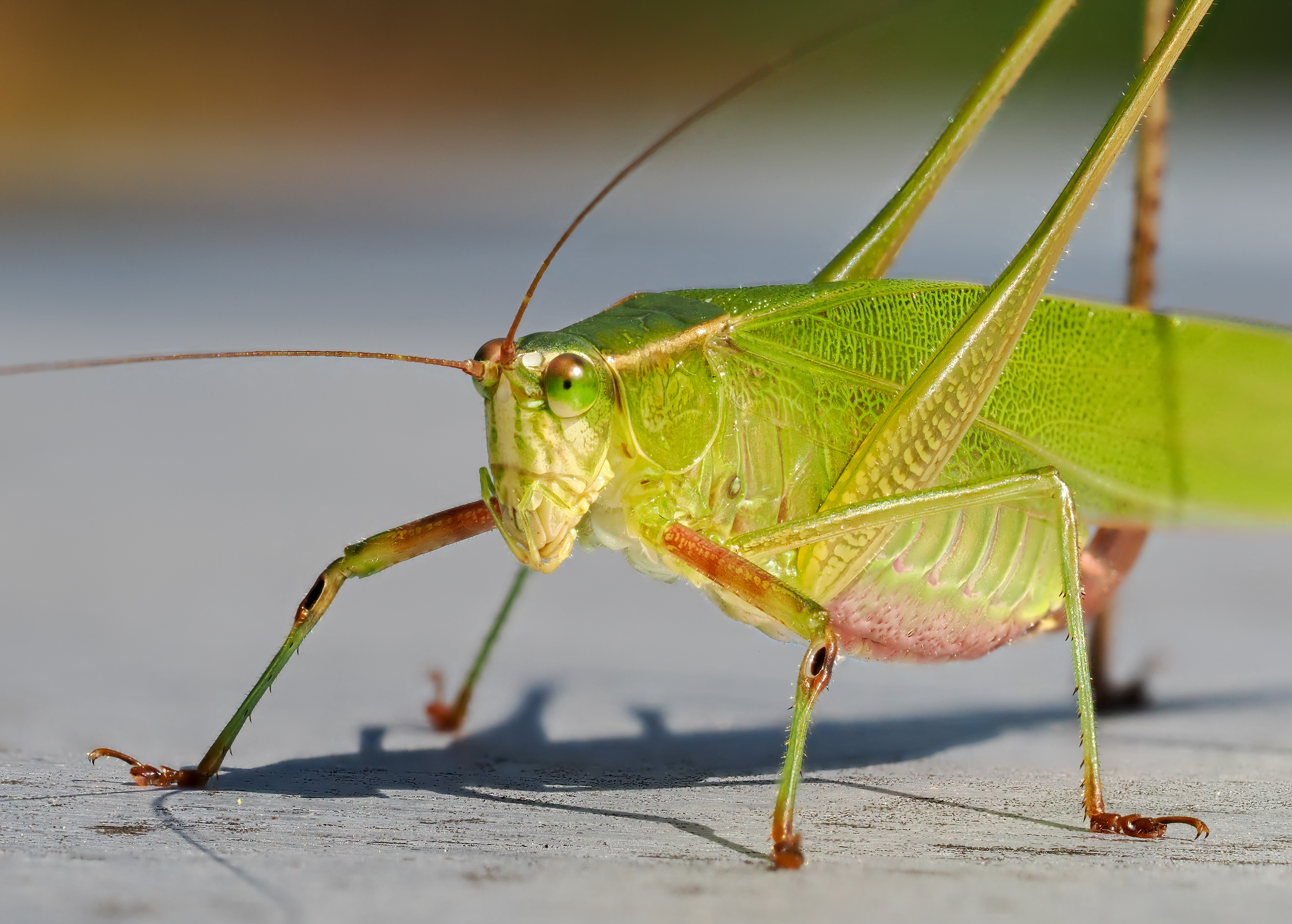
Close-up of an adult
