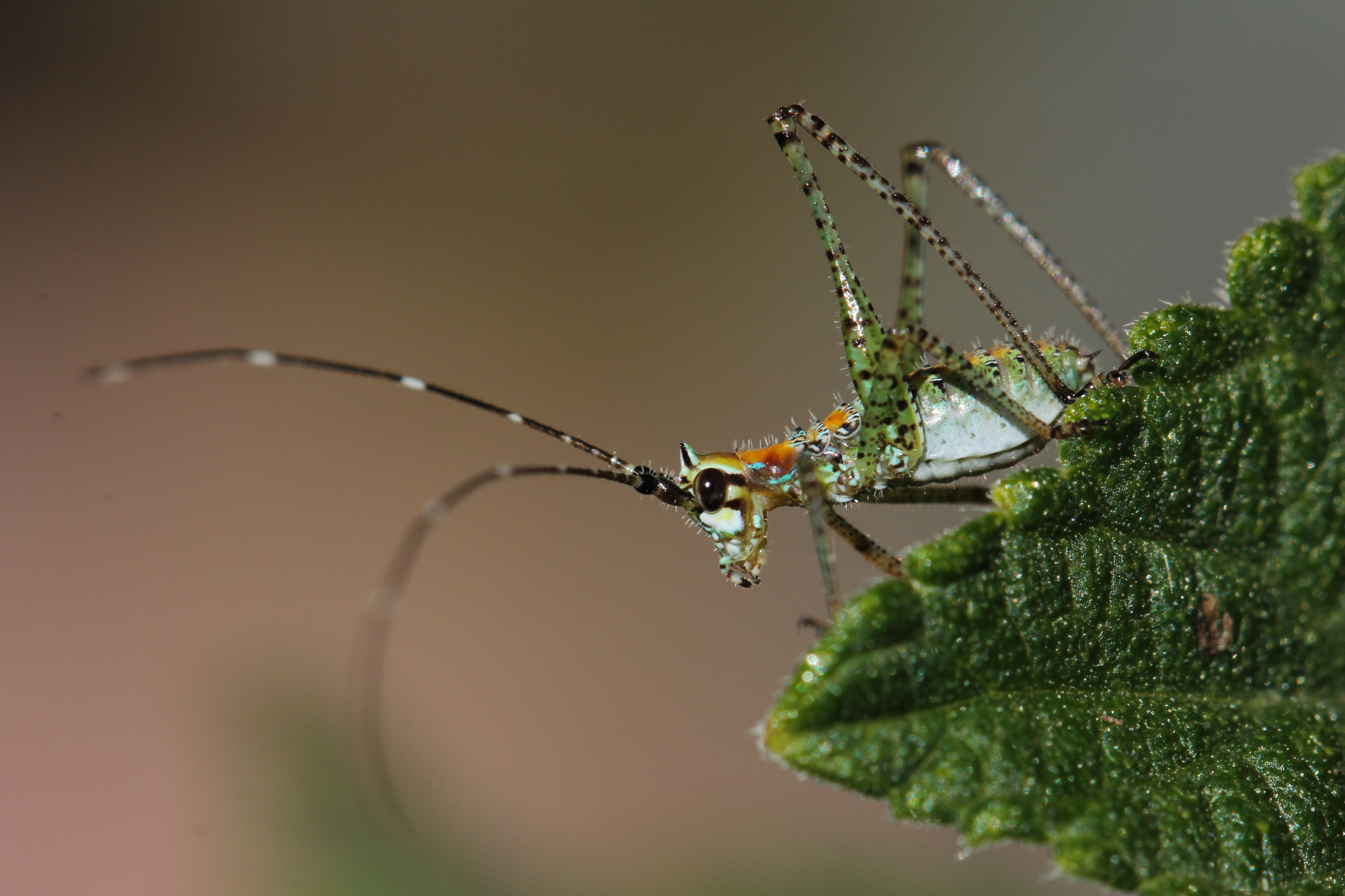
- Nymph of Mexican bush katydid

Scientific classification
- Kingdom: Animalia
- Phylum: Arthropoda
- Class: Insecta
- Order: Orthoptera
- Suborder: Ensifera
- Family: Tettigoniidae
- Subfamily: Phaneropterinae
- Genus: Scudderia
- Species: S. mexicana

Binomial name
- Scudderia mexicana (Saussure, 1861)

= Scudderia mexicana =

Species of cricket-like animal

Scudderia mexicana, the Mexican bush katydid, is a species of phaneropterine katydid in the family Tettigoniidae. They are 30–38 mm in length and have slender wings. Nymphs have a horn between their antennae. They eat leaves, including big-leaf mahogany.
