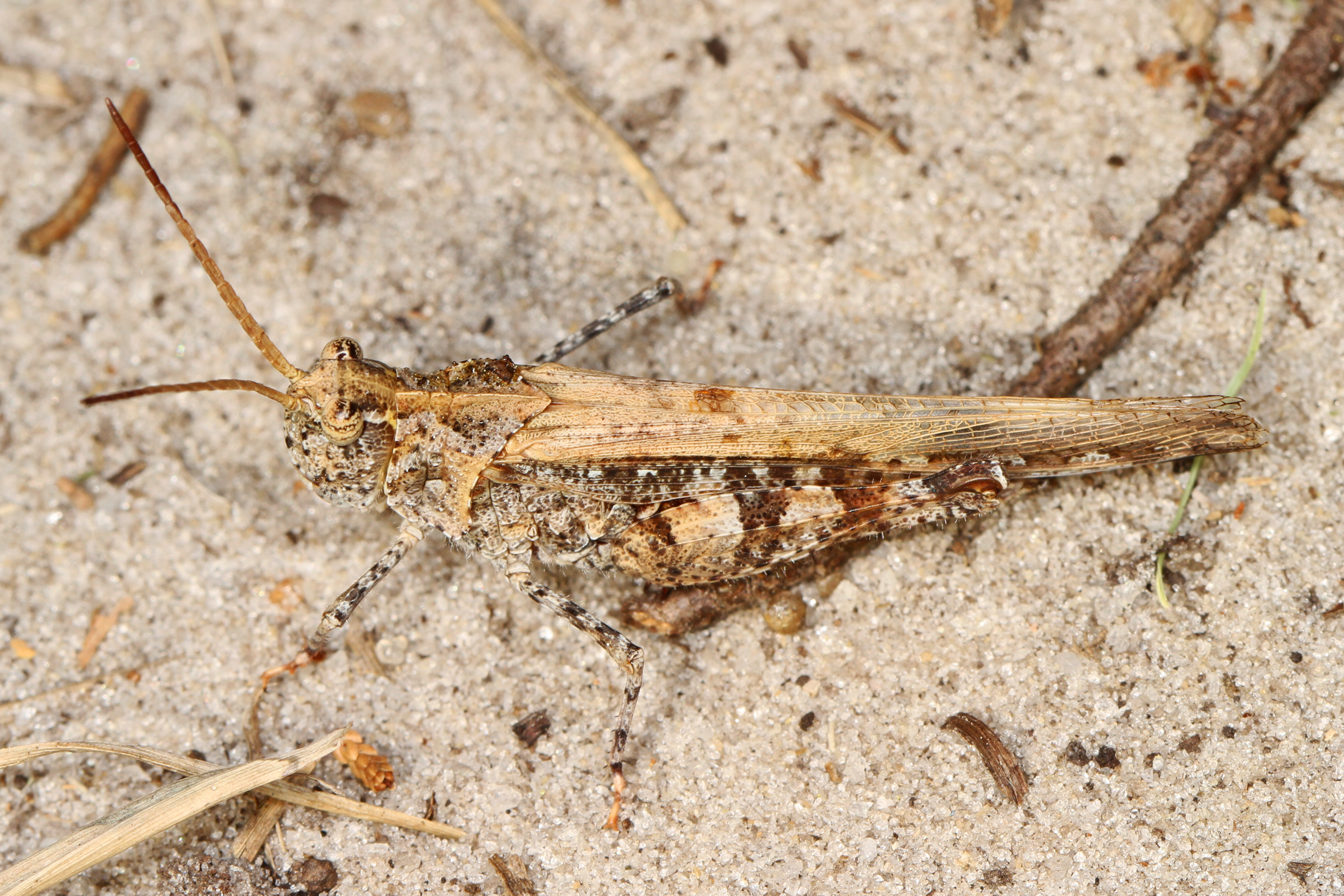

Scientific classification
- Domain: Eukaryota
- Kingdom: Animalia
- Phylum: Arthropoda
- Class: Insecta
- Order: Orthoptera
- Suborder: Caelifera
- Family: Acrididae
- Genus: Psinidia
- Species: P. fenestralis

Binomial name
- Psinidia fenestralis (Serville, 1839)

= Psinidia fenestralis =

Species of grasshopper

Psinidia fenestralis, known generally as longhorn band-wing grasshopper, is a species of band-winged grasshopper in the family Acrididae. Other common names include the long-horned grasshopper, long-horned locust, and sand locust. It is found in the Caribbean and North America.

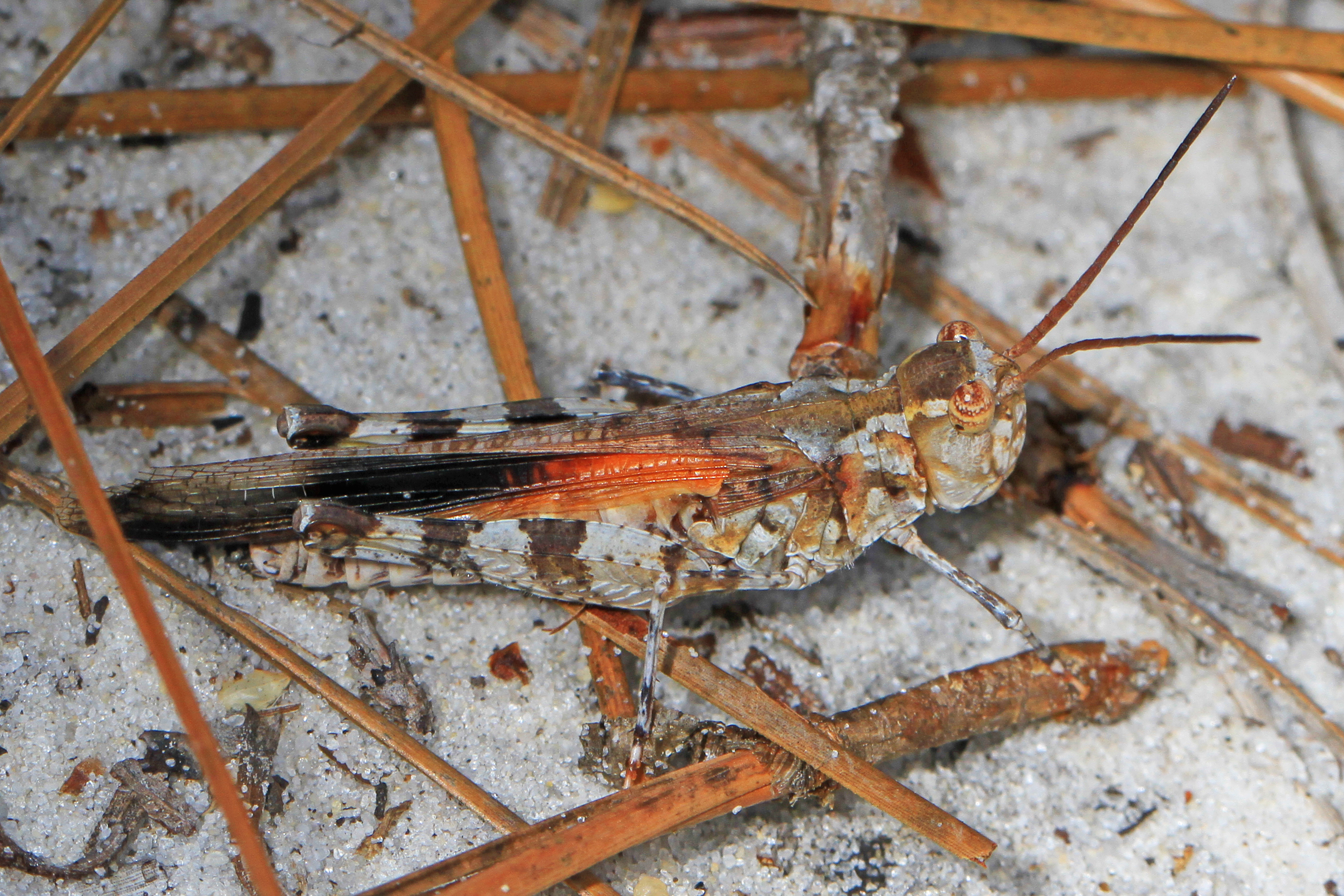
Longhorn band-wing grasshopper, Psinidia fenestralis
