= Acronicta parallela =

Scientific classification
- Kingdom: Animalia
- Phylum: Arthropoda
- Clade: Pancrustacea
- Class: Insecta
- Order: Lepidoptera
- Superfamily: Noctuoidea
- Family: Noctuidae
- Genus: Acronicta
- Species: A. parallela

Binomial name
- Acronicta parallela Grote, 1879

Species of moth

Acronicta parallela, the parallel dagger moth, is a species of moth of the family Noctuidae. It was considered a synonym of Acronicta falcula but reinstated as a valid species in 2011. It is found in North America, including Colorado and Oklahoma.
