= Acronicta falcula =

Corylus dagger moth

Conservation status
- Vulnerable (NatureServe)

Scientific classification
- Kingdom: Animalia
- Phylum: Arthropoda
- Clade: Pancrustacea
- Class: Insecta
- Order: Lepidoptera
- Superfamily: Noctuoidea
- Family: Noctuidae
- Genus: Acronicta
- Species: A. falcula

Binomial name
- Acronicta falcula (Grote, 1877)

Synonyms
- Apatela falcula Grote, 1877

Species of moth

Acronicta falcula, the corylus dagger moth, is a moth of the family Noctuidae. The species was first described by Augustus Radcliffe Grote in 1877. It is found in the United States and Canada from southern New England to southern Manitoba and Iowa. Recently seen from Wisconsin, Connecticut, Rhode Island, New York and Michigan. It is reported as rare in Ohio. It is listed as a species of special concern in the US state of Connecticut.

The wingspan is about 42 mm. There are probably two generations in about May and July to August in most of its range.

The larvae feed on the foliage of Corylus species.

== Taxonomy ==
Acronicta mansueta Smith, 1897 and Acronicta parallela Grote, 1879 were placed as synonyms of Acronicta falcula, but later reinstated as valid species.
