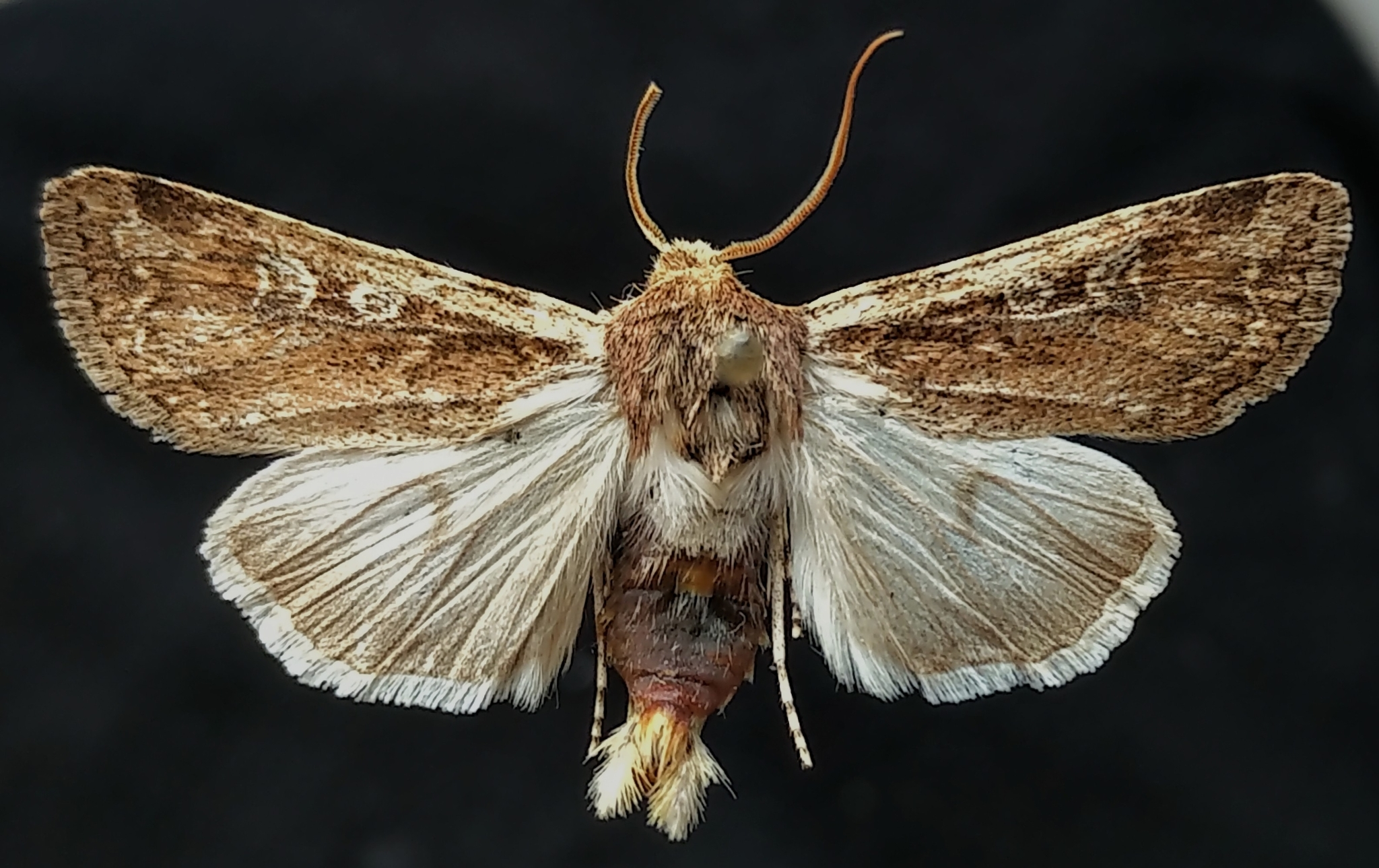

Scientific classification
- Kingdom: Animalia
- Phylum: Arthropoda
- Clade: Pancrustacea
- Class: Insecta
- Order: Lepidoptera
- Superfamily: Noctuoidea
- Family: Noctuidae
- Genus: Euxoa
- Species: E. aurulenta

Binomial name
- Euxoa aurulenta (Smith, 1888)

Synonyms
- Agrotis aurulenta Smith, 1890; Euxoa aurulentoides (Strand, 1916)

= Euxoa aurulenta =

Species of moth

Euxoa aurulenta, commonly known as the dune cutworm, is a species of moth in the family Noctuidae. The species was first described by Smith in 1888. It is found in North America from Ontario west to Alberta and Washington, south to Illinois, Nebraska, Colorado and Arizona.

The wingspan is 35–39 mm. Adults are on wing in May to July. There is one generation per year.

The larvae probably feed on species of dune grass. In Michigan specimens have been collected near the beach grasses Ammophila breviligulata and Calmovilfa longifolia.
