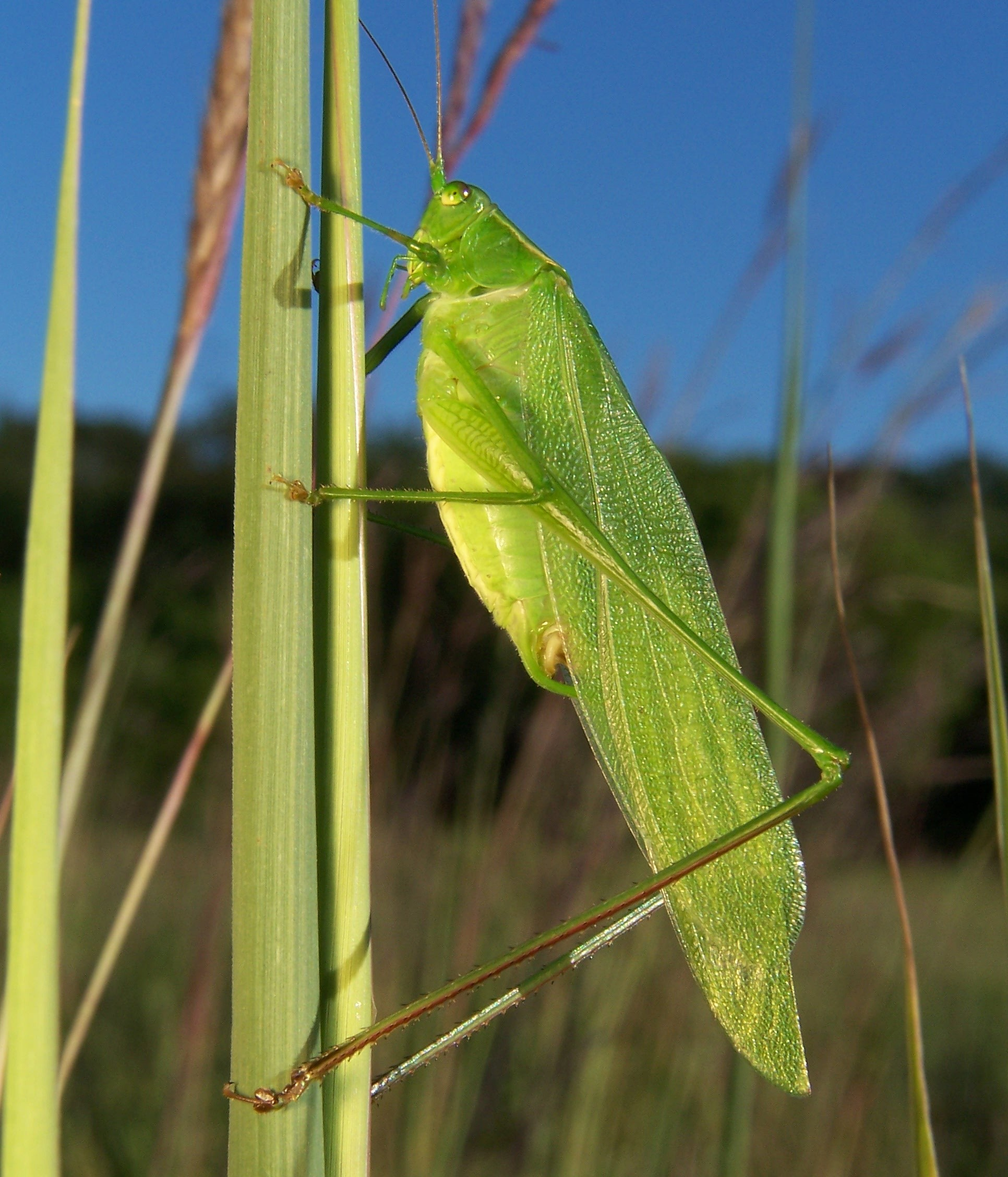
- Scudderia sp.

Scientific classification
- Kingdom: Animalia
- Phylum: Arthropoda
- Clade: Pancrustacea
- Class: Insecta
- Order: Orthoptera
- Suborder: Ensifera
- Family: Tettigoniidae
- Subfamily: Phaneropterinae
- Tribe: Scudderiini
- Genus: Scudderia; Stål, 1873

Synonyms
- Spilacris Rehn & Cockerell, 1903

= Scudderia =

Genus of cricket-like animals

Scudderia is a genus of katydids in the subfamily Phaneropterinae. They are sometimes called bush katydids and are 30–38 mm in length. Their range is much of North America from southern Canada southward in deciduous forests, shrublands, grasslands. Some can even be in more lush parts of some desert areas from southern California southward. They are herbivores, with nymphs feeding primarily on flowers and adults preferring woody deciduous plants.

== Species ==
- Scudderia beckeri Piza, 1967
- Scudderia bivittata Piza, 1976
- Scudderia chelata Piza, 1980
- Scudderia cuneata Morse, 1901
- Scudderia curvicauda (De Geer, 1773)
- Scudderia dentata Brunner von Wattenwyl, 1878
- Scudderia fasciata Beutenmüller, 1894
- Scudderia furcata Brunner von Wattenwyl, 1878
- Scudderia intermedia Márquez Mayaudón, 1958
- Scudderia mexicana (Saussure, 1861)
- Scudderia pallens (Fabricius, 1787)
- Scudderia paraensis Piza, 1980
- Scudderia paronae Griffini, 1896
- Scudderia pistillata Brunner von Wattenwyl, 1878 – broadwinged bush katydid
- Scudderia salesopolensis Piza, 1980
- Scudderia septentrionalis (Serville, 1838)
- Scudderia surinama Piza, 1980
- Scudderia texensis Saussure & Pictet, 1897
- Scudderia trombetana Piza, 1980
- Scudderia ungulata Scudder, 1898
- Scudderia williamsi Piza, 1974
