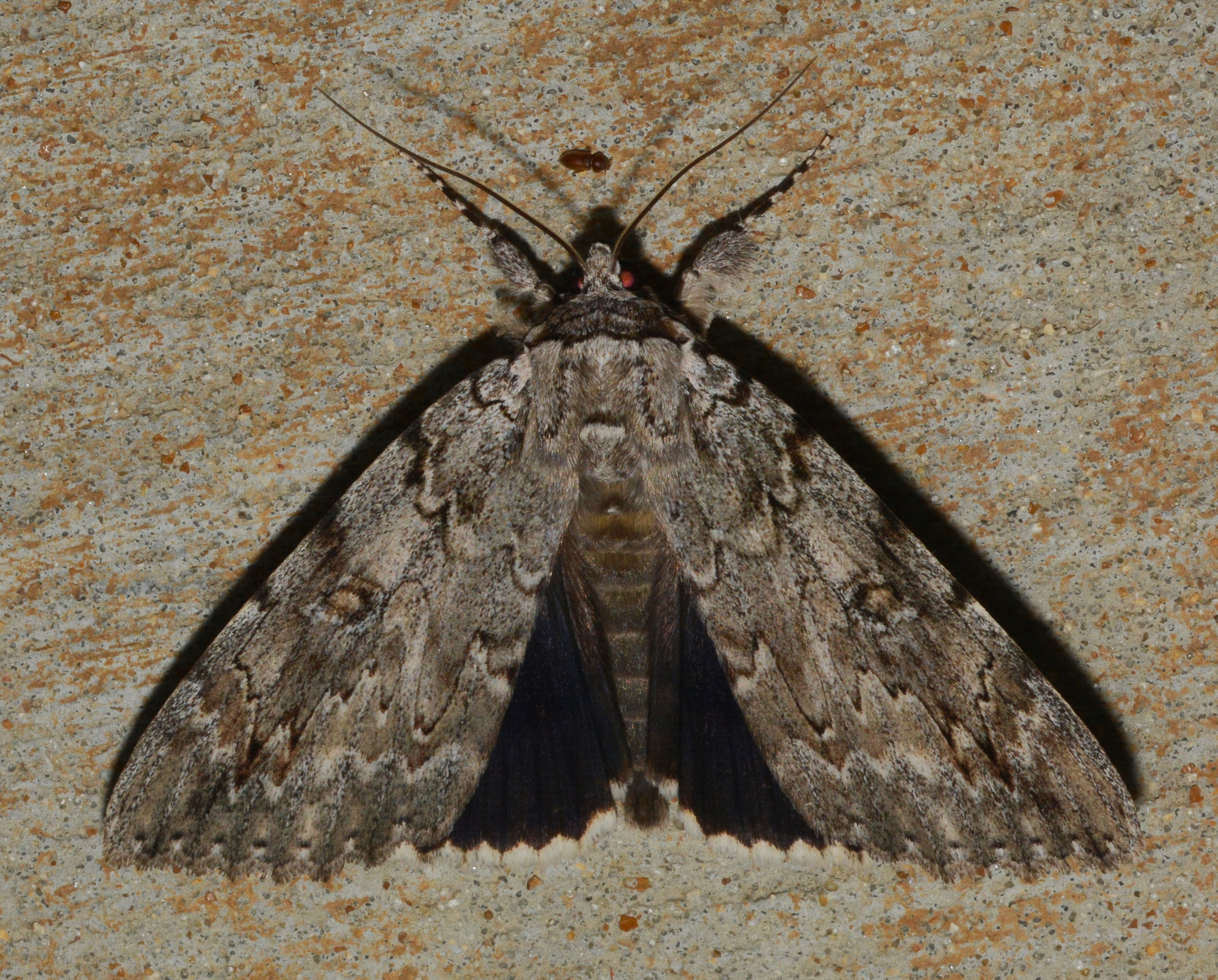

Scientific classification
- Kingdom: Animalia
- Phylum: Arthropoda
- Class: Insecta
- Order: Lepidoptera
- Superfamily: Noctuoidea
- Family: Erebidae
- Genus: Catocala
- Species: C. robinsonii

Binomial name
- Catocala robinsonii Grote, 1872

Synonyms
- Catabapta robinsoni; Catocala curvata French, 1881; Catocala missouriensis Schwarz, 1915; Catocala robinsonii curvata

= Catocala robinsonii =

Robinson's underwing

Species of insect

Catocala robinsonii, or Robinson's underwing, is a moth of the family Erebidae. The species was first described by Augustus Radcliffe Grote in 1872. It is found in North America from southern Ontario and New Hampshire south to Florida west to Oklahoma, Missouri and Arkansas and northward to Illinois, Indiana, and Michigan (where it is rare).

The wingspan is 70–80 mm. Adults are on wing from July to October depending on the location. There is probably one generation per year.

The larvae feed on Carya ovata, Juglans and Quercus alba.
