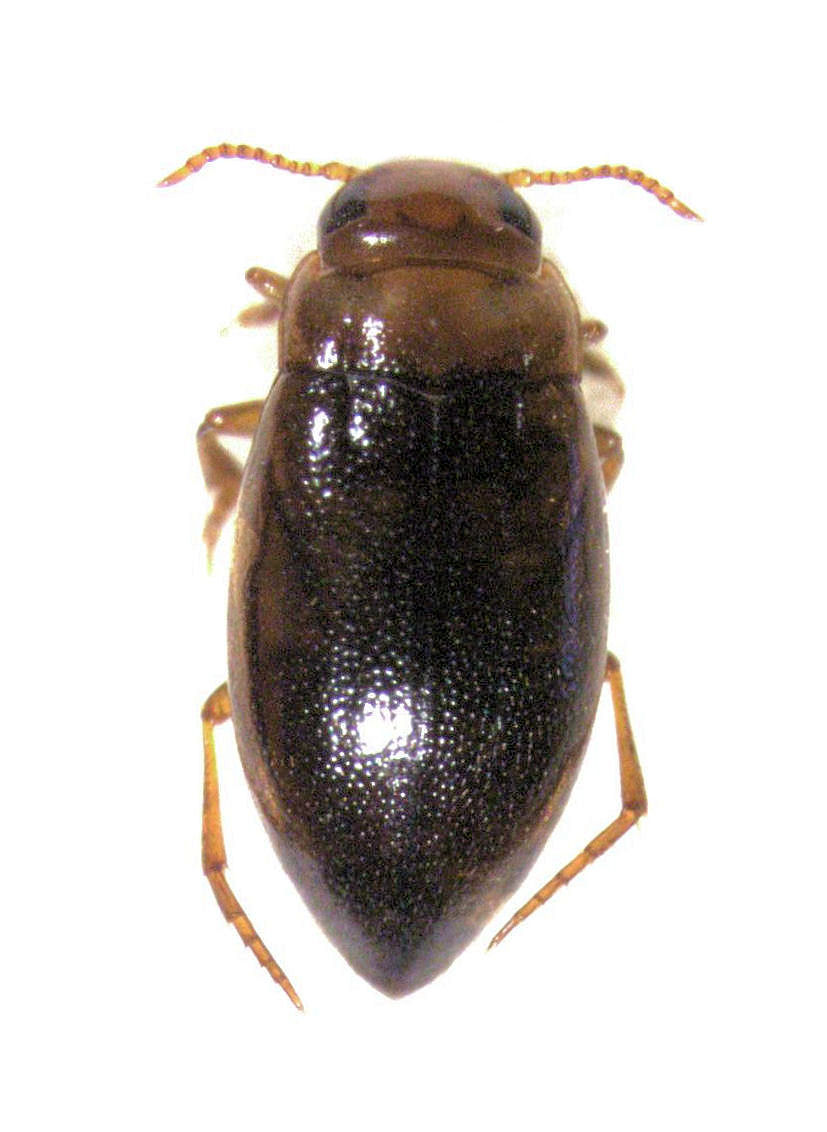
- Liodessus plicatus

Scientific classification
- Kingdom: Animalia
- Phylum: Arthropoda
- Class: Insecta
- Order: Coleoptera
- Suborder: Adephaga
- Family: Dytiscidae
- Tribe: Bidessini
- Genus: Liodessus; Guignot, 1939

= Liodessus =

Genus of beetles

Liodessus is a genus of beetles in the family Dytiscidae, containing the following species:

- Liodessus abjectus (Sharp, 1882)
- Liodessus acollensis Guignot, 1955
- Liodessus affinis (Say, 1823)
- Liodessus andinus Guignot, 1957
- Liodessus antrias Guignot, 1955
- Liodessus bogotensis Guignot, 1953
- Liodessus bonariensis (Steinheil, 1869)
- Liodessus bordoni Pederzani, 2001
- Liodessus cancellosus Guignot, 1957
- Liodessus cantralli (Young, 1953)
- Liodessus chilensis (Solier, 1849)
- Liodessus crassus (Sharp, 1882)
- Liodessus crotchi Nilsson, 2001
- Liodessus deflectus Ordish, 1966
- Liodessus delfini (Régimbart, 1899)
- Liodessus dilatatus (Régimbart, 1895)
- Liodessus emaciatus Guignot, 1953
- Liodessus fijiensis (J.Balfour-Browne, 1944)
- Liodessus flavicollis (LeConte, 1855)
- Liodessus flavofasciatus (Steinheil, 1869)
- Liodessus guttatus Biström, 1988
- Liodessus hobbsi (Young, 1950)
- Liodessus incrassatus Biström, 1988
- Liodessus involucer (Brinck, 1948)
- Liodessus legrosi Biström, 1988
- Liodessus leonensis Franciscolo & Sanfilippo, 1990
- Liodessus luteopictus (Régimbart, 1897)
- Liodessus microscopicus (Zimmermann, 1921)
- Liodessus miersii (White, 1847)
- Liodessus noviaffinis K.B.Miller, 1998
- Liodessus obscurellus (LeConte, 1852)
- Liodessus ophonoides Guignot, 1955
- Liodessus patagonicus (Zimmermann, 1923)
- Liodessus plicatus (Sharp, 1882)
- Liodessus rhicnodes Guignot, 1955
- Liodessus riveti (Peschet, 1923)
- Liodessus saratogae K.B.Miller, 1998
- Liodessus strobeli (Steinheil, 1869)
- Liodessus uruguensis (Sharp, 1882)
