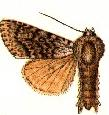

Scientific classification
- Kingdom: Animalia
- Phylum: Arthropoda
- Clade: Pancrustacea
- Class: Insecta
- Order: Lepidoptera
- Superfamily: Noctuoidea
- Family: Noctuidae
- Genus: Acronicta
- Species: A. lupini

Binomial name
- Acronicta lupini (Grote, 1873)

Synonyms
- Merolonche lupina McDunnough, 1938 (missp.); Merolonche lupini (Grote, 1873); Merolonche ursina Smith, 1898; Acronicta ursina (Smith, 1898); Merolonche atlinensis (Barnes & Benjamin, 1927; Acronicta atlinensis (Barnes & Benjamin, 1927)

= Acronicta lupini =

Species of moth

Acronicta lupini, the lupine dagger or little bear, is a moth of the family Noctuidae. The species was first described by Augustus Radcliffe Grote in 1873. It is found from Quebec, Newfoundland and Labrador, British Columbia, Alberta and Yukon in Canada, south to California.

It is found in alpine habitats.

The wingspan is about 33 mm. Adults are on wing from May to August in Canada.
