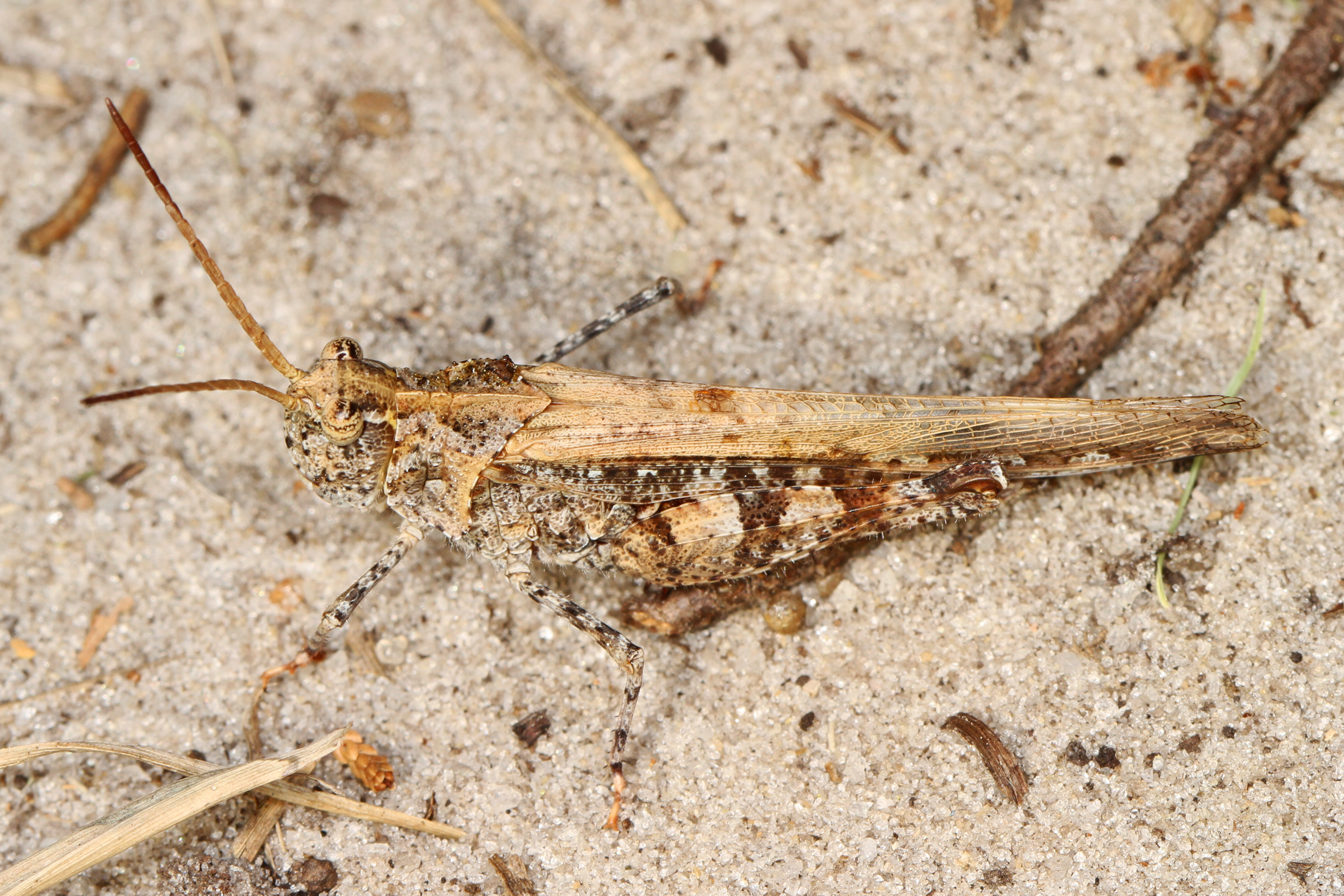
- Psinidia fenestralis

Scientific classification
- Kingdom: Animalia
- Phylum: Arthropoda
- Clade: Pancrustacea
- Class: Insecta
- Order: Orthoptera
- Suborder: Caelifera
- Family: Acrididae
- Subfamily: Oedipodinae
- Tribe: Psinidiini
- Genus: Psinidia; Stål, 1873

= Psinidia =

Genus of grasshoppers

Psinidia is a genus of band-winged grasshoppers in the family Acrididae. There are at least three described species in Psinidia.

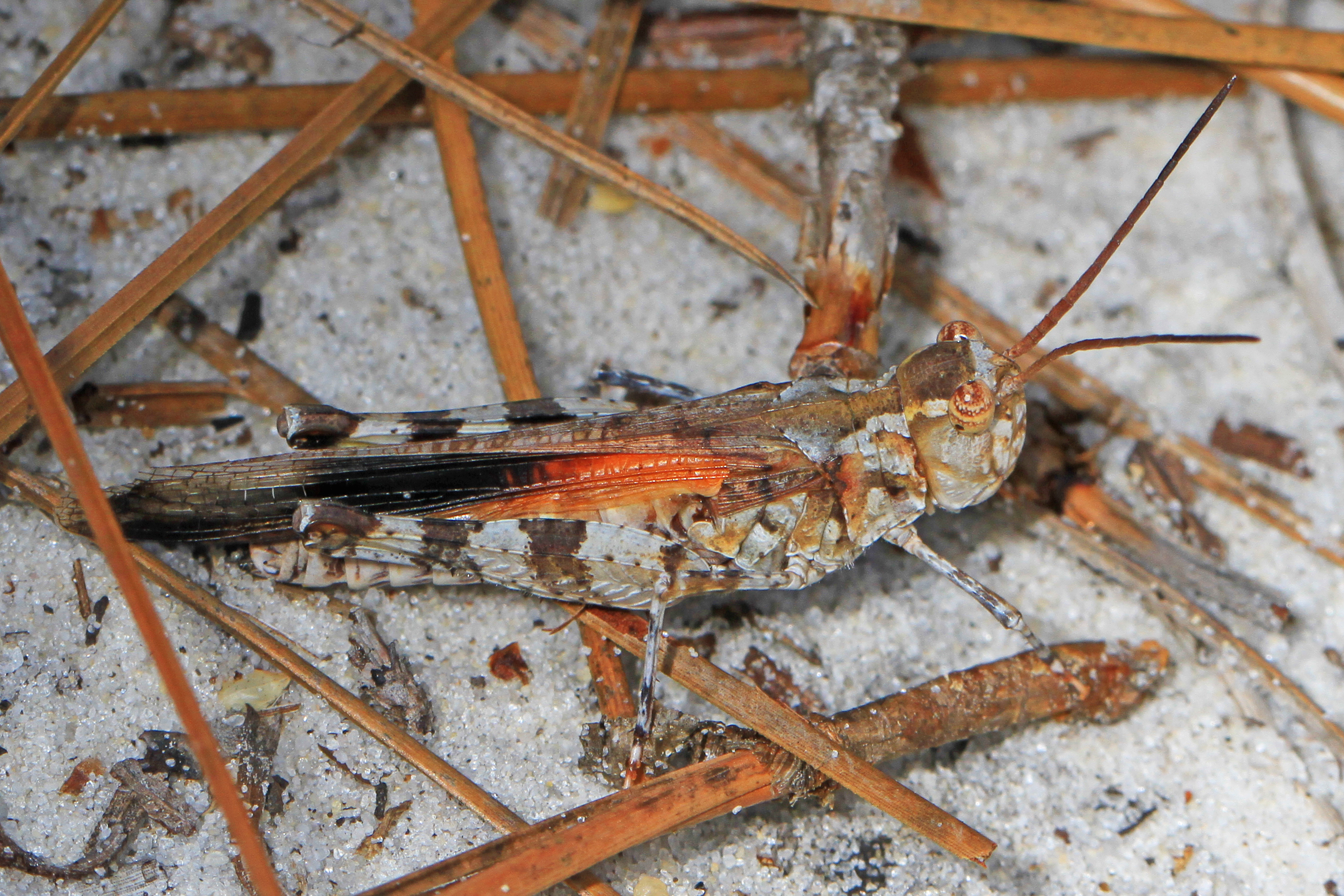
Psinidia fenestralis

== Species ==
These three species belong to the genus Psinidia:

- Psinidia amplicornis Caudell, 1903 (Caudell's longhorn grasshopper)
- Psinidia amplicornus Caudell, 1903
- Psinidia fenestralis (Serville, 1839) (longhorn band-wing grasshopper)
