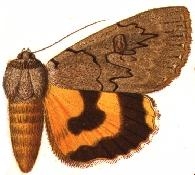

Scientific classification
- Kingdom: Animalia
- Phylum: Arthropoda
- Class: Insecta
- Order: Lepidoptera
- Superfamily: Noctuoidea
- Family: Erebidae
- Genus: Catocala
- Species: C. illecta

Binomial name
- Catocala illecta Walker, 1858

Synonyms
- Catocala magdalena Strecker, 1874

= Catocala illecta =

Species of moth

Catocala illecta, the Magdalen underwing, is a moth of the family Erebidae. The species was first described by Francis Walker in 1858. It is found in North America from south-western Ontario south to Tennessee and South Carolina and west and south to Texas and north through Oklahoma and Kansas to Nebraska, Wisconsin, Indiana, Illinois and Michigan.

The wingspan is 60–70 mm. Adults are on wing from May to July depending on the location. There is probably one generation per year.

The larvae feed on Amorpha canescens, Gleditsia triacanthos and Robinia pseudoacacia.
