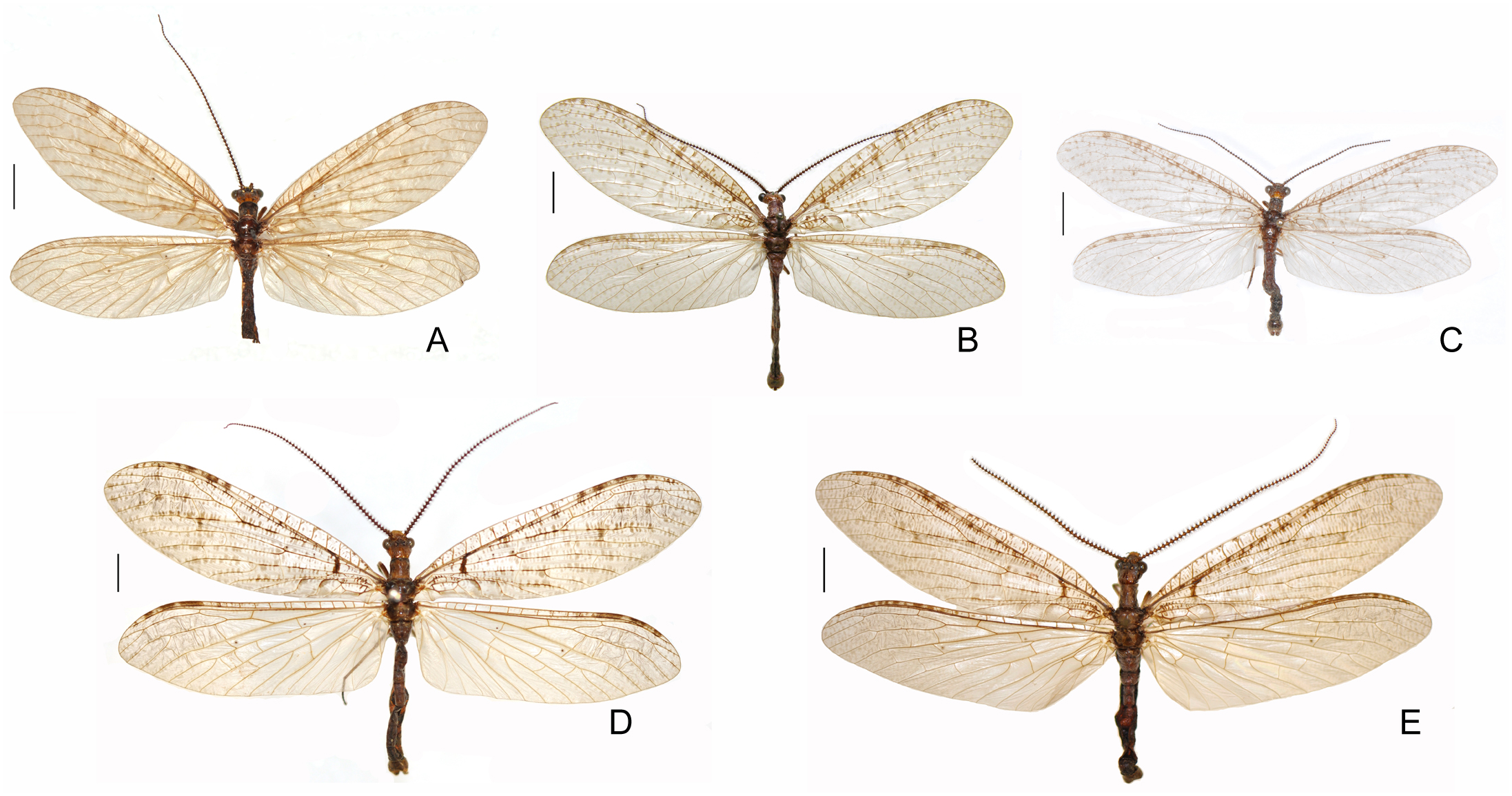

Scientific classification
- Kingdom: Animalia
- Phylum: Arthropoda
- Clade: Pancrustacea
- Class: Insecta
- Order: Megaloptera
- Family: Corydalidae
- Subfamily: Chauliodinae
- Genus: Neohermes; Banks, 1908

= Neohermes =

Genus of insects

Neohermes is a genus of fishflies in the family Corydalidae. There are about 5 described species in Neohermes.

== Species ==
- Neohermes angusticollis (Hagen, 1861)
- Neohermes californicus (Walker, 1853)
- Neohermes concolor (Davis, 1903)
- Neohermes filicornis (Banks, 1903)
- Neohermes matheri Flint, 1965
