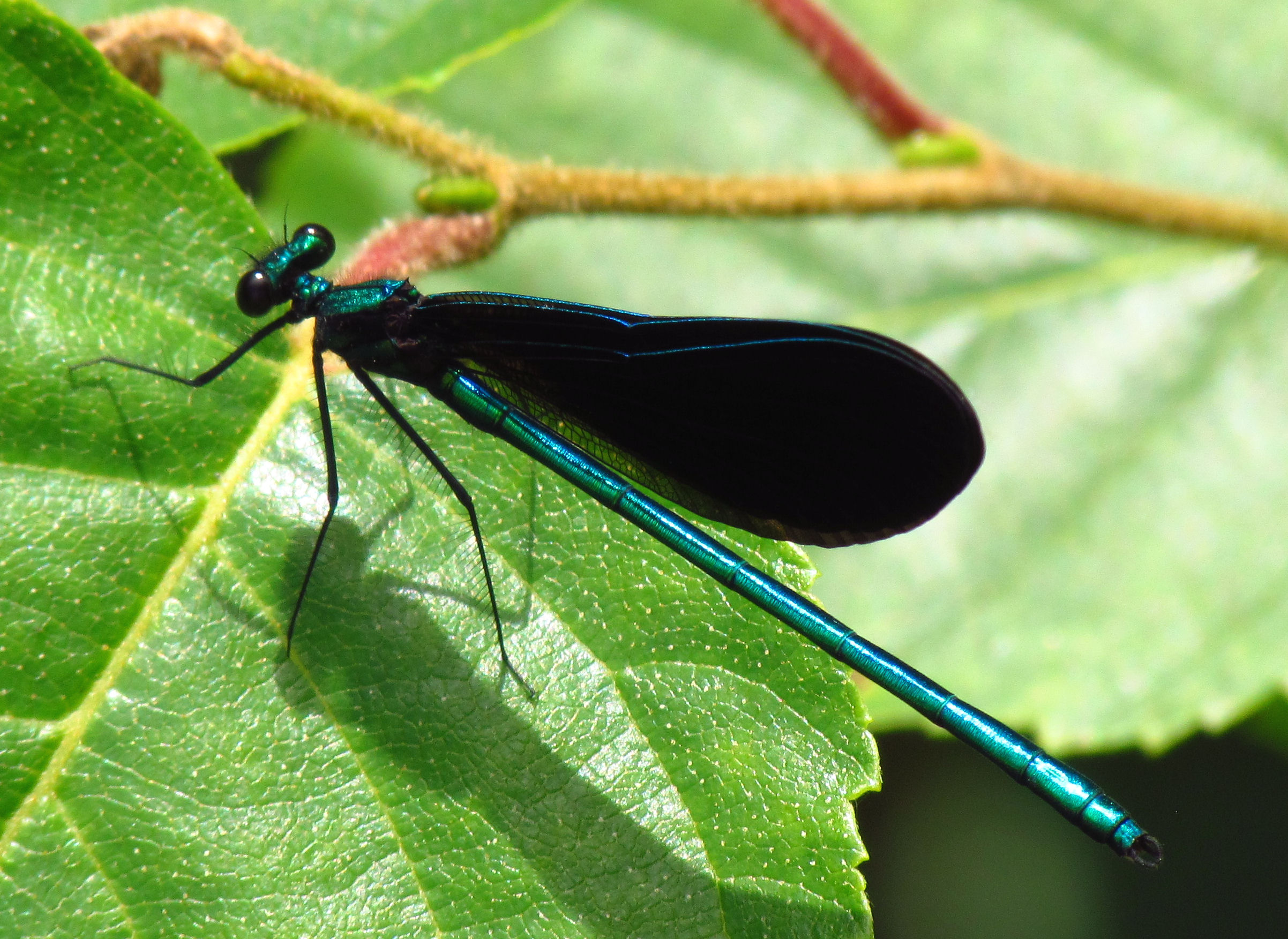
- Male
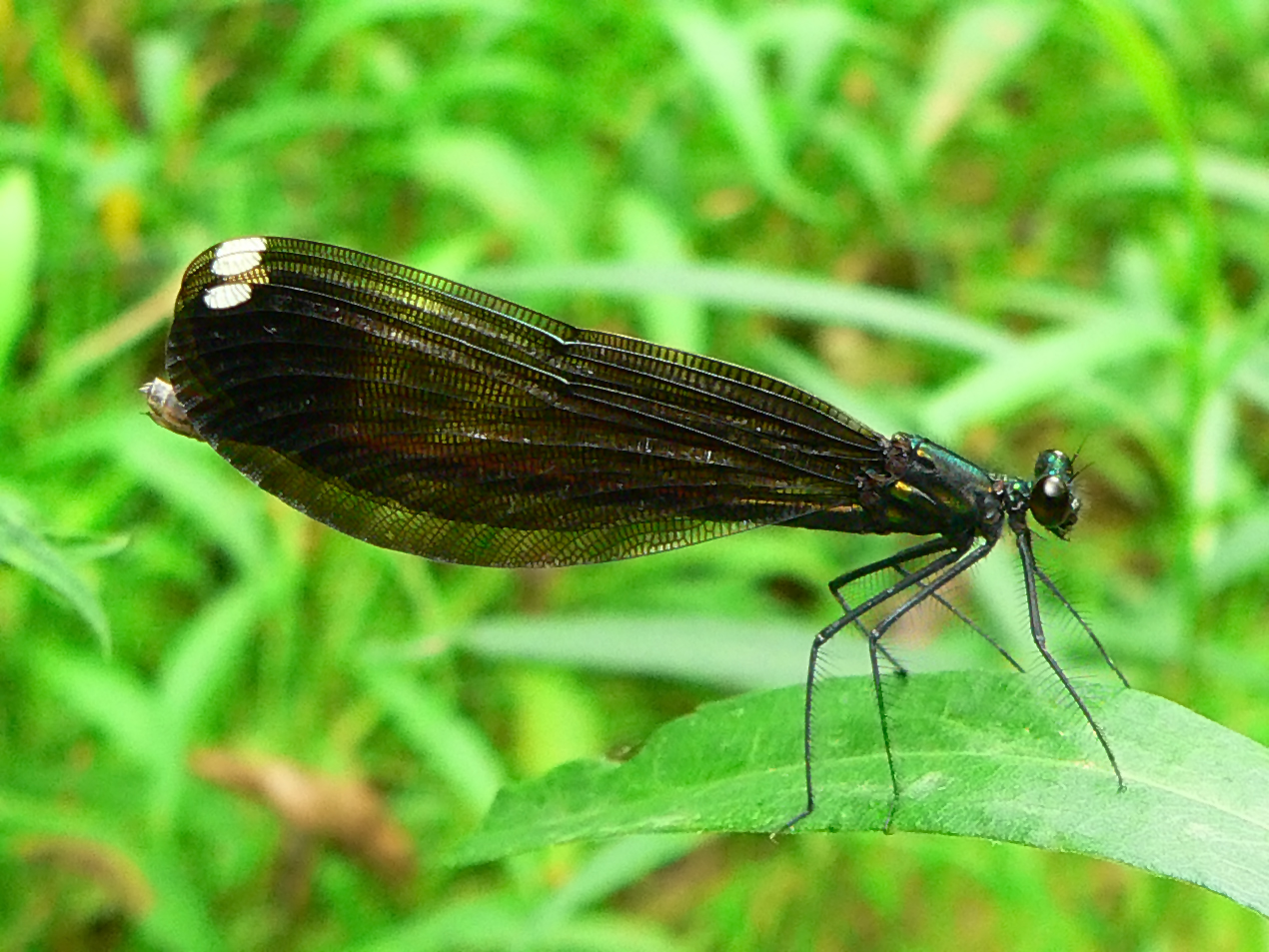
- Female

Conservation status
- Secure (NatureServe)

Scientific classification
- Kingdom: Animalia
- Phylum: Arthropoda
- Class: Insecta
- Order: Odonata
- Suborder: Zygoptera
- Family: Calopterygidae
- Genus: Calopteryx
- Species: C. maculata

Binomial name
- Calopteryx maculata (Palisot de Beauvois, 1807)

Synonyms
- Agrion maculata Palisot de Beauvois, 1807; Agrion virginica Westwood, 1837; Calopteryx holosericea Burmeister, 1839; Calopteryx maculata subsp. floridana Huggins, 1927; Calopteryx materna Say, 1840; Calopteryx opaca Say, 1840; Calopteryx papilionacea Rambur, 1842

= Ebony jewelwing =

Species of damselfly

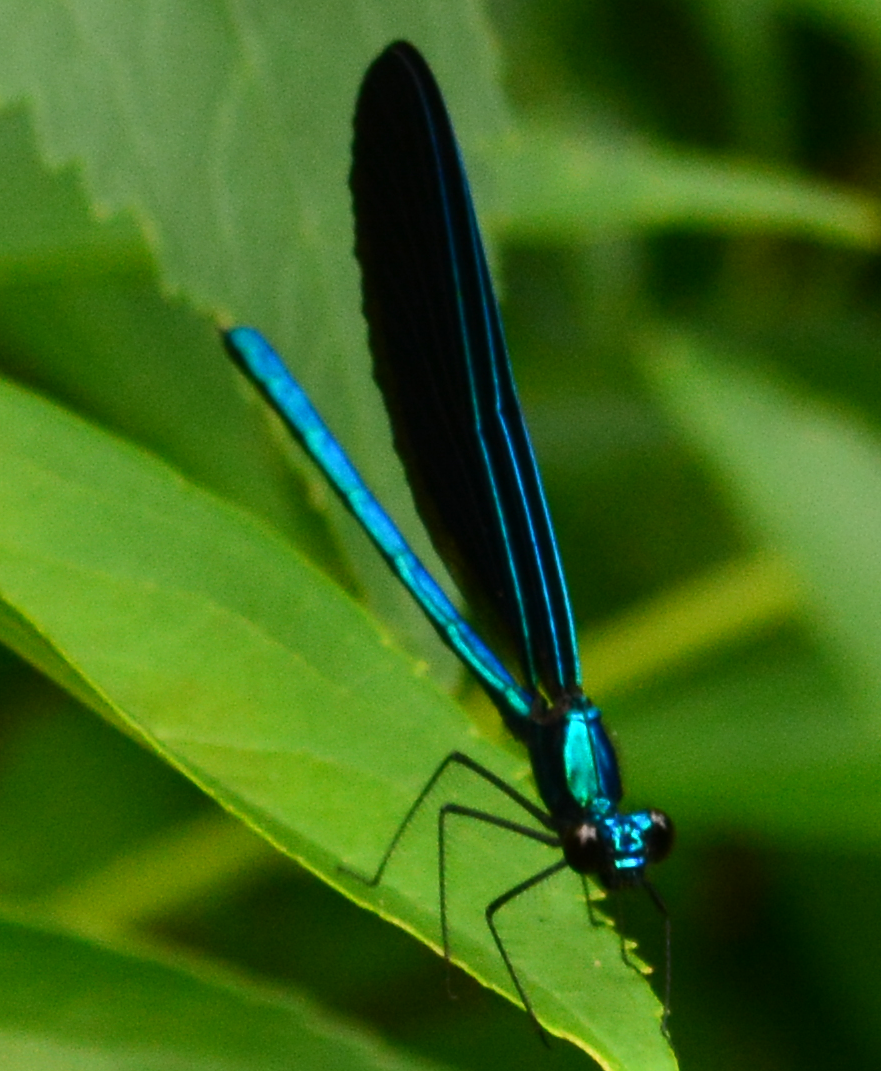
Male in North Carolina

The ebony jewelwing (Calopteryx maculata) is a species of broad-winged damselfly. One of about 150 species of Calopterygidae, it is found in the eastern U.S. and southeastern Canada, ranging west to the Great Plains. Other common names include black-winged damselfly.

== Description ==
It is between 39–57 mm (1.5–2.2 in). The male has a metallic blue-green body and black wings. The female is duller brown with smoky wings that have white spots near the tips (pseudopterostigmas). The naiad is pale brown with darker markings. There are some spots in the wings.

== Habitat ==
It lives near wooded streams and rivers, but it can move far from water.

== Breeding ==
Ebony jewelwings mate in the summer. The male holds the female behind her head with his tail or abdomen. The female lays eggs in the soft stems of aquatic plants. The naiad eats small aquatic insects. When the naiad is fully grown, it crawls out of the water and molts.

== Flight season ==
This damselfly species can be seen almost year-round in some regions.

== Ecology ==
Prey of this species includes the tiger mosquito, giant willow aphid, fungus gnats, crane flies, large diving beetles, eastern dobsonfly, water fleas, green darner, aquatic oligochaetes, caddisflies, rotifers, copepods, amphipods, dogwood borer, six-spotted tiger beetle, freshwater triclads, and green hydra.

Predators of this damselfly include birds such as the great crested flycatcher, American robin, mallard, red-winged blackbird, and blue jay, reptiles and amphibians such as the eastern painted turtle, common snapping turtle, and southern leopard frog, fish such as the bluegill, largemouth bass, yellow perch, creek chub, channel catfish, common carp, and northern hogsucker, mammals such as the big brown bat, and insects such as the green darner, large diving beetles, eastern dobsonfly, and common water strider.

The damselfly shelters among various plants and algaes in its habitat, including green algae, yellow water lily, hydrilla, lizard's tail, pickerelweed, common cattail, upright sedge, common bladderwort, common duckweed, black willow, orange jewelweed, spotted Joe-pye weed, poison ivy, wild grape, sassafras, common greenbrier, and buttonbush.

== Gallery ==
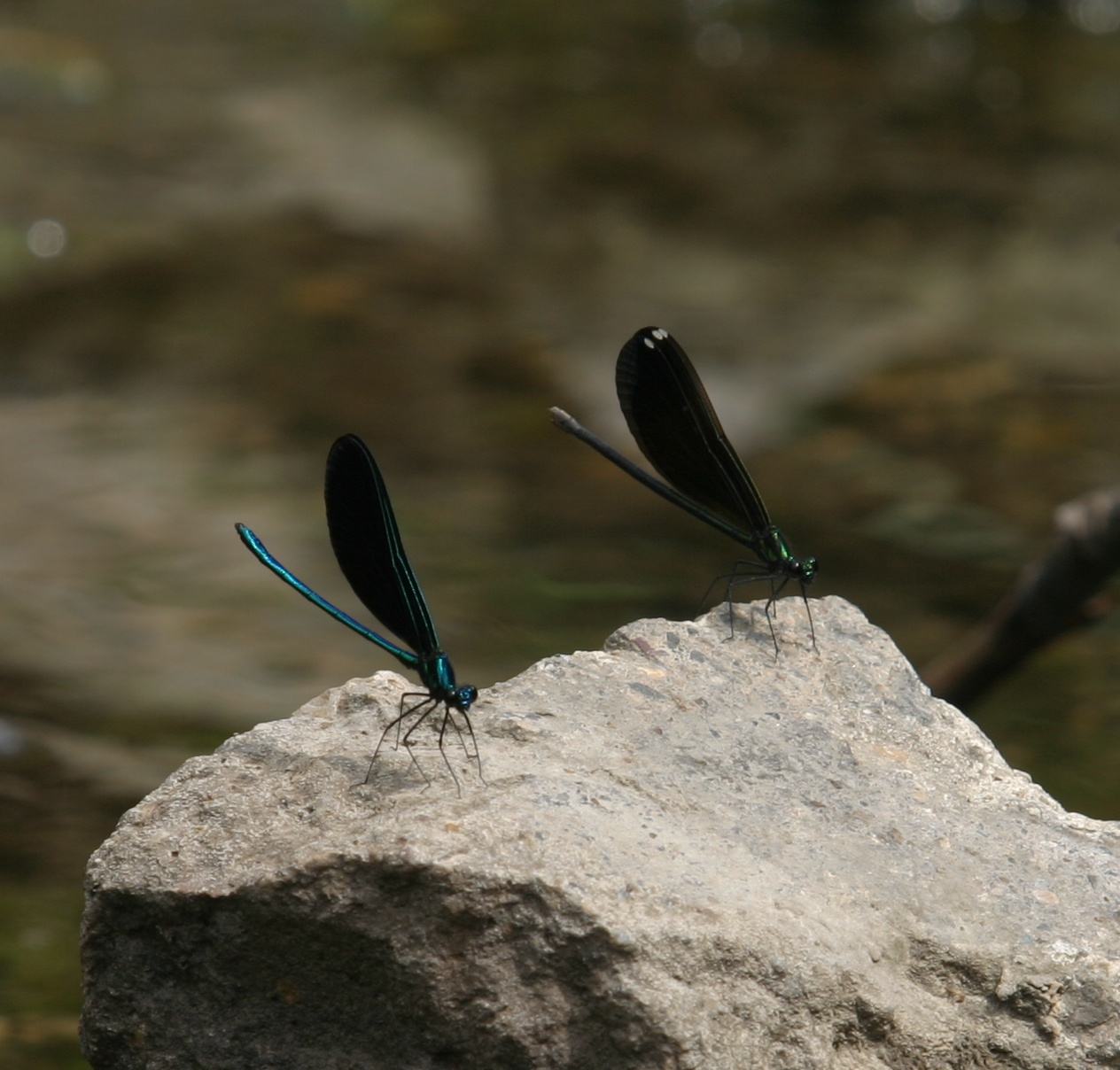
Male & female

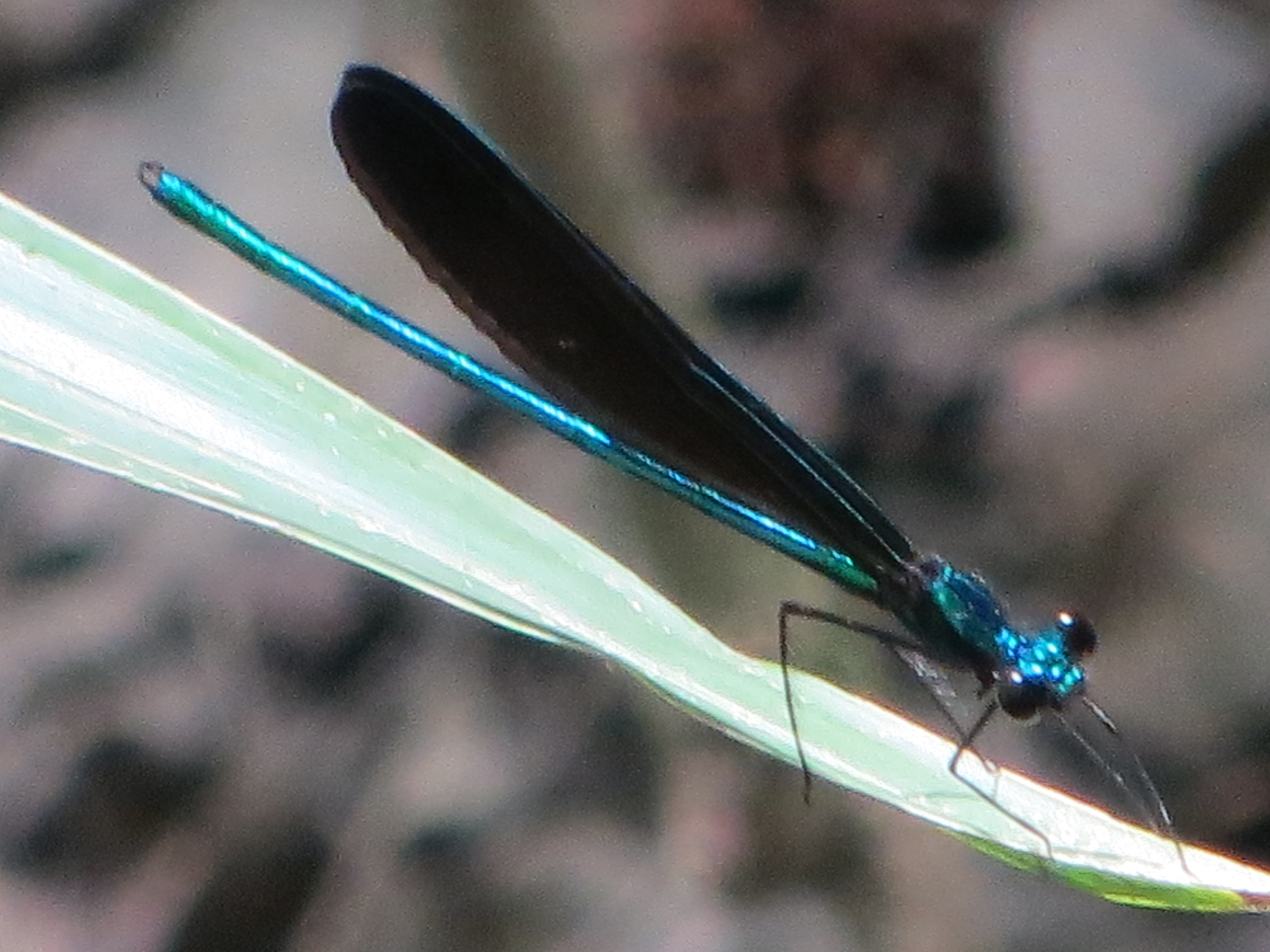
On palmetto at Francis Beidler Forest

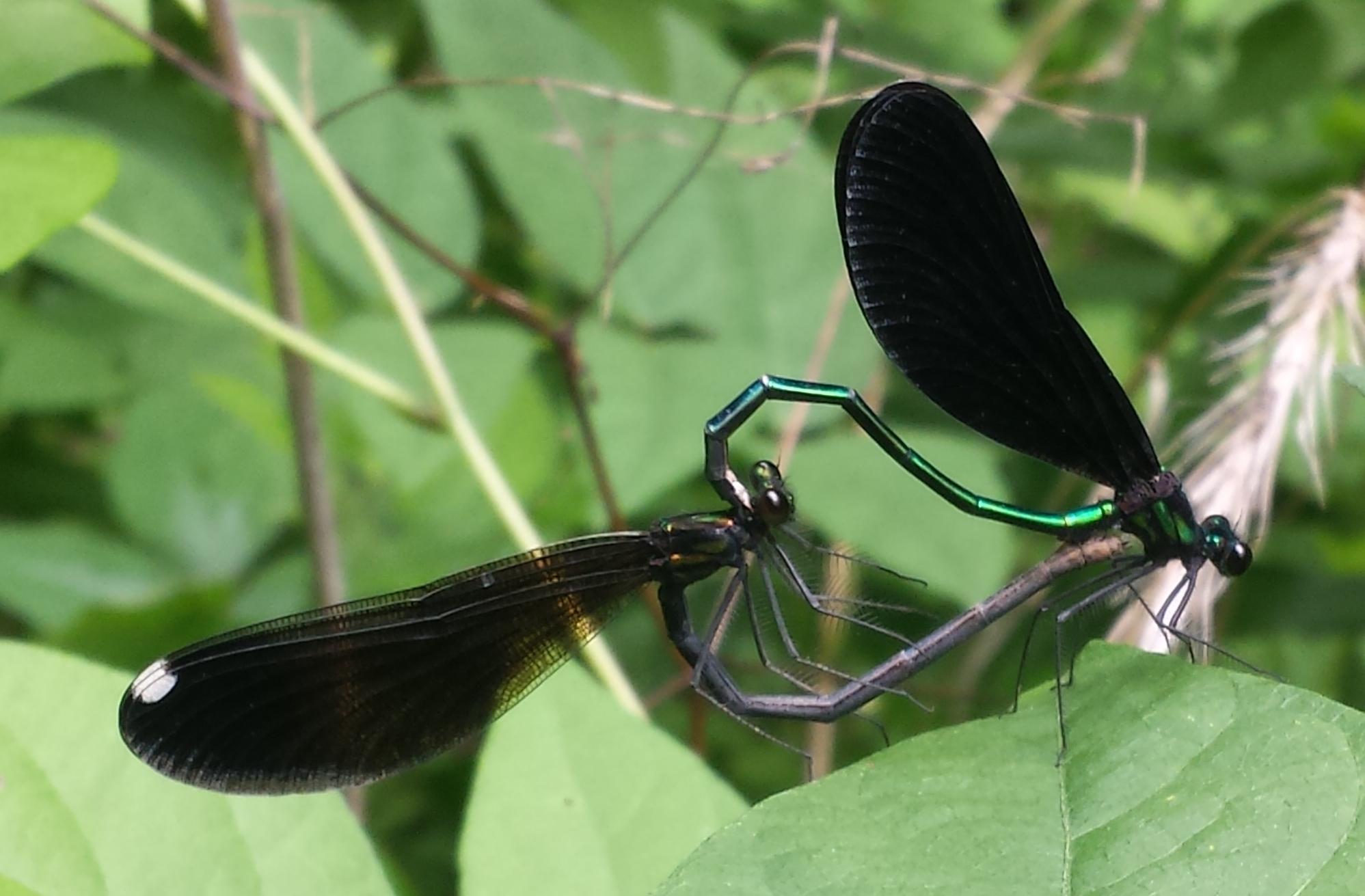
Mating

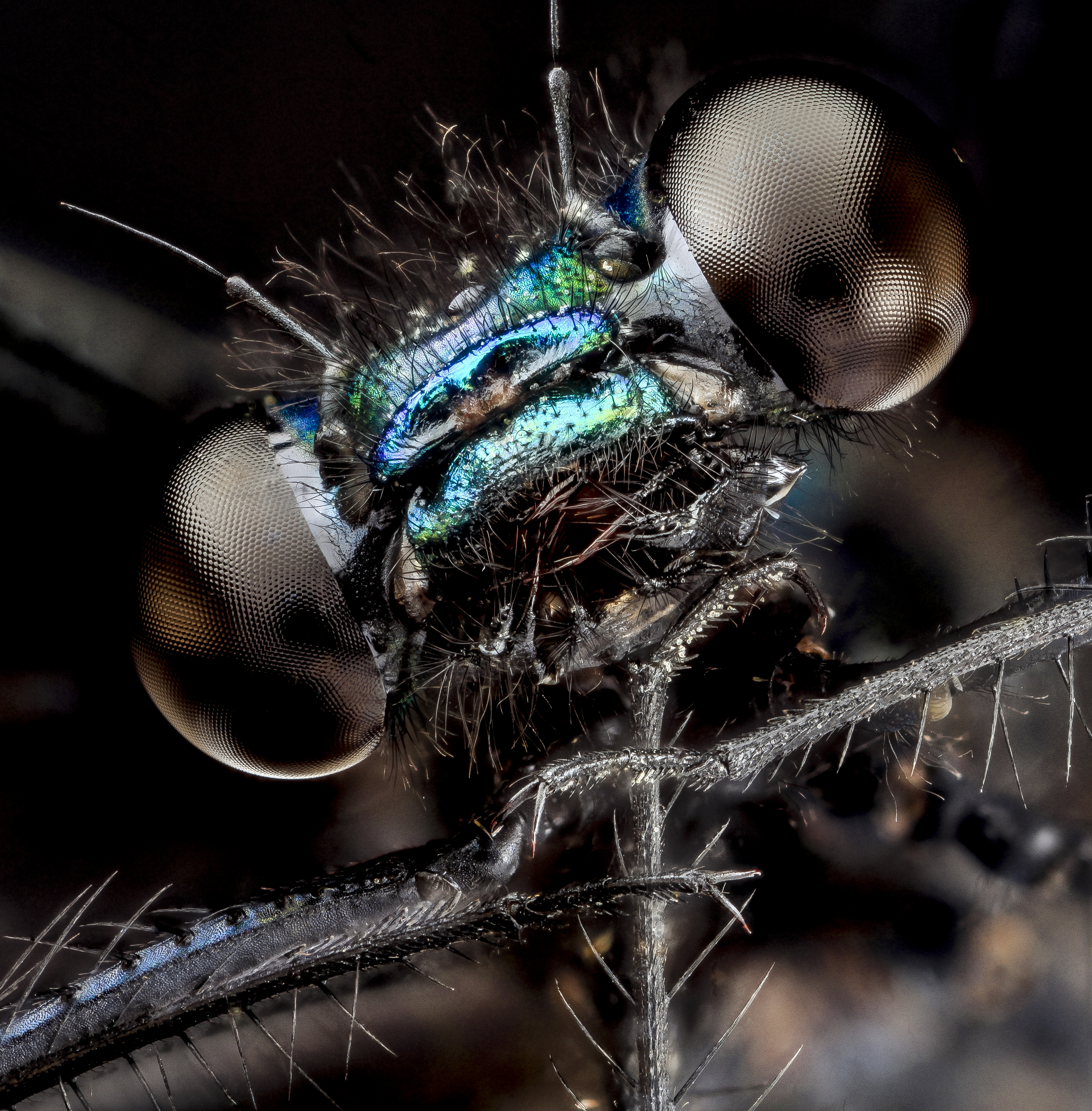
Eyes
