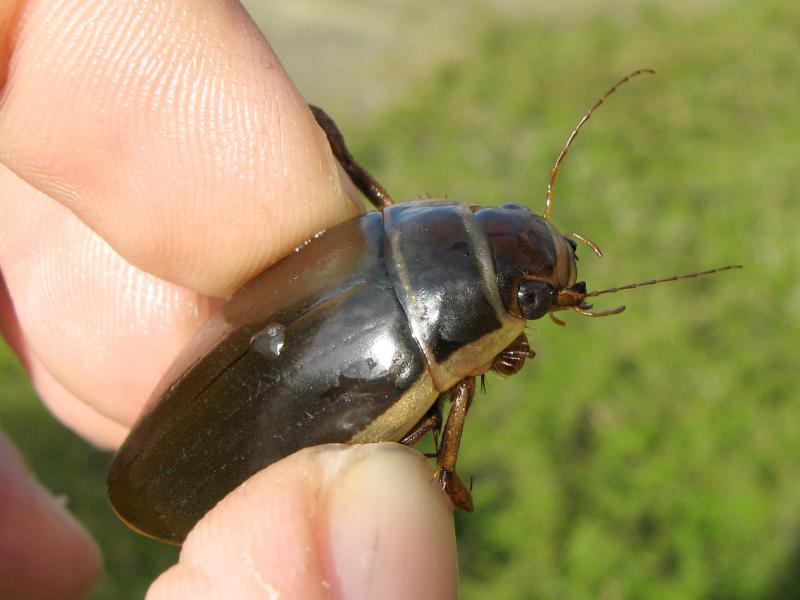

Scientific classification
- Kingdom: Animalia
- Phylum: Arthropoda
- Class: Insecta
- Order: Coleoptera
- Suborder: Adephaga
- Family: Dytiscidae
- Genus: Dytiscus
- Species: D. circumcinctus

Binomial name
- Dytiscus circumcinctus Ahrens, 1811

Synonyms
- Dytiscus anxius Mannerheim, 1843; Dytiscus ooligbucki Kirby, 1837

= Dytiscus circumcinctus =

Species of beetle

Dytiscus circumcinctus is a species of predaceous diving beetle in the family Dytiscidae. It is found in North America and the Palearctic.
