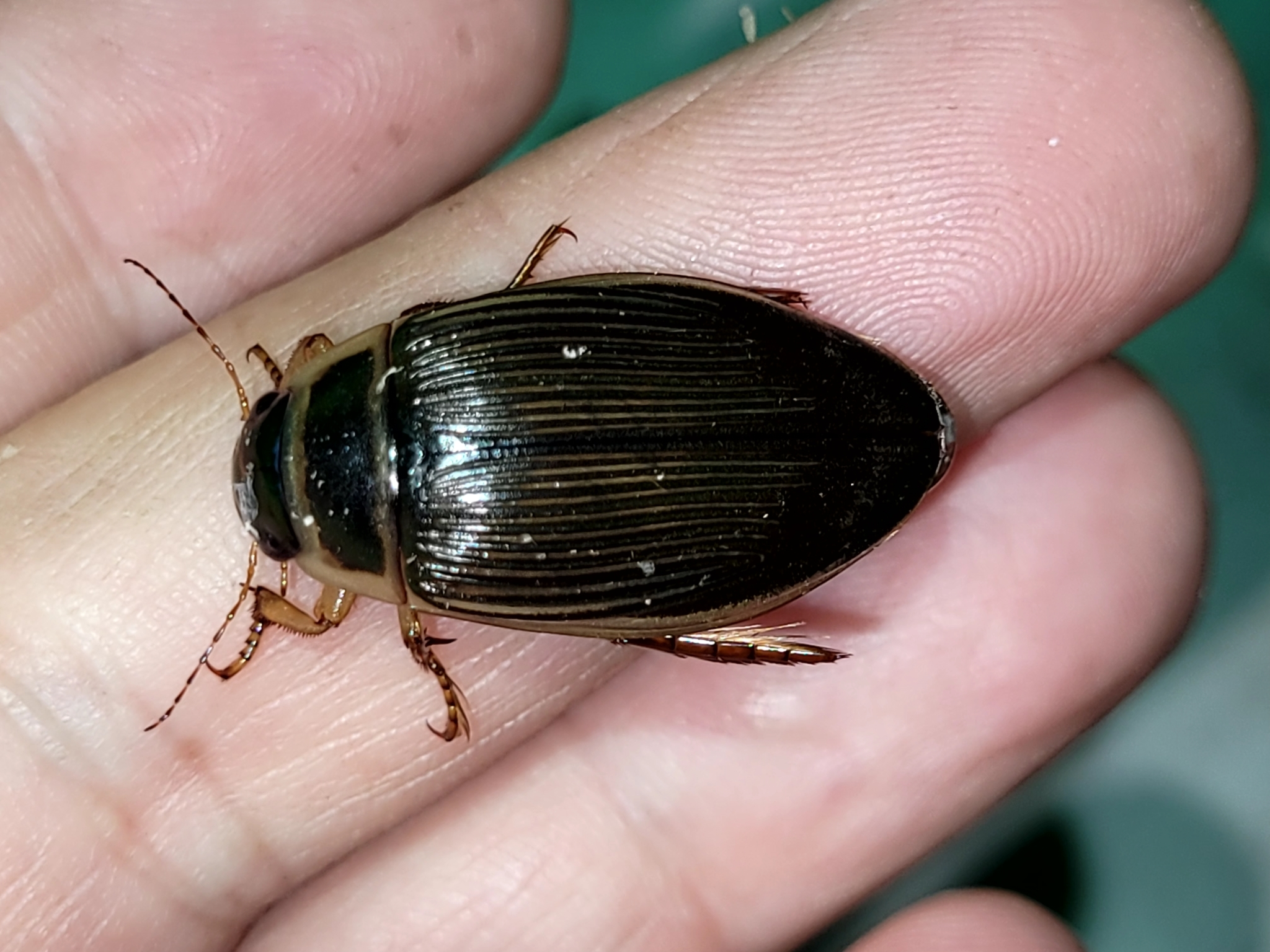

Scientific classification
- Domain: Eukaryota
- Kingdom: Animalia
- Phylum: Arthropoda
- Class: Insecta
- Order: Coleoptera
- Suborder: Adephaga
- Family: Dytiscidae
- Genus: Dytiscus
- Species: D. alaskanus

Binomial name
- Dytiscus alaskanus J. Balfour-Browne, 1944

= Dytiscus alaskanus =

Species of beetle

Dytiscus alaskanus, commonly known as the boreal water beetle or Alaskan diving beetle, is a species of predaceous diving beetle in the family Dytiscidae. It is found in North America.
