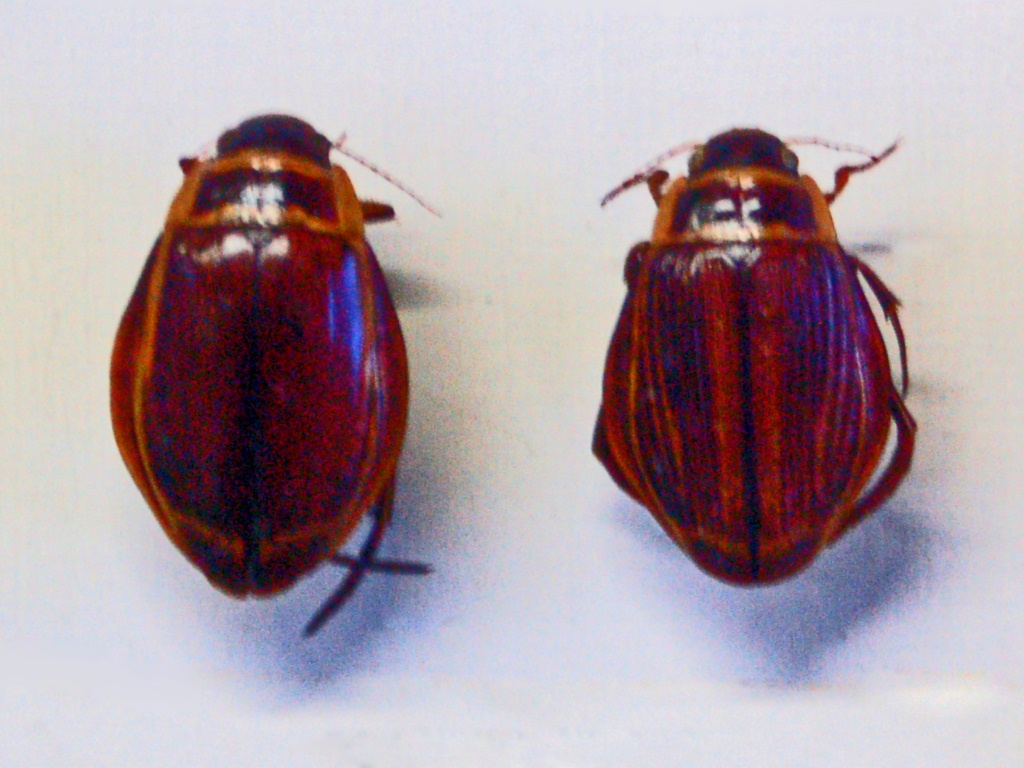
- Dytiscus latissimus male and female, at National Museum (Prague)

Conservation status
- Vulnerable (IUCN 2.3)

Scientific classification
- Kingdom: Animalia
- Phylum: Arthropoda
- Clade: Pancrustacea
- Class: Insecta
- Order: Coleoptera
- Suborder: Adephaga
- Family: Dytiscidae
- Genus: Dytiscus
- Species: D. latissimus

Binomial name
- Dytiscus latissimus Linnaeus, 1758

= Dytiscus latissimus =

Species of beetle

Dytiscus latissimus is a large species of aquatic beetle in family Dytiscidae. It is native to Europe and considered threatened.

== Description ==
One of the largest representatives of the predaceous diving beetles of the family Dytiscidae (its maximum size only exceeded by the Brazilian Megadytes ducalis), D. latissimus can reach a length around 38–44 mm (1.5–1.7 in). This beetle is similar in structure to the better-known and widespread D. marginalis, but it is clearly larger and especially wider. The species is usually easy to recognize by the extensions on both sides of the shield. The elytra and the pronotum are dark brown with yellow sides. The head is black, while the legs are yellow. The male's wing cases are shiny, while those of the female are finely grooved. This voracious predator hunts a wide variety of prey, including other insects, tadpoles, and small fish. Before they dive, they collect air bubbles in their wing cases which go through the spiracles.

== Distribution ==
This species can be found in northern and central European countries. The species is listed on Annex II and Annex IV of the European Union Habitats Directive; the latter gives it strict protection within the EU member countries.

== Habitat ==
It is an aquatic species and it inhabits in dense vegetation, mainly of Carex and Equisetum, at the edges of lakes or in nonflowing waters and deep ponds. They key parameter of the habitat is the abundance of case-making caddis flies, which serve as the primary food for D. latissimus larvae.

== Conservation ==
The species was extirpated from much of its previous area, including most of Central Europe. The main reason is the rise of intensive use of water bodies for fish production. There is a successful breeding program for this species in Latvia, which gives hope for potential reintroduction into formerly inhabited areas, should they become habitable for the species in the future.

== Gallery ==
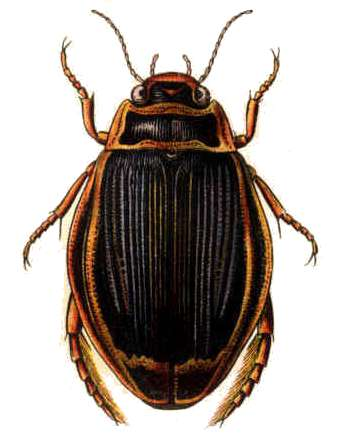
Illustration from Fauna Germanica: Die Käfer des deutschen Reiches (vol. I, pl. 39) (1908)
