= Corydalus liui =

Scientific classification
- Kingdom: Animalia
- Phylum: Arthropoda
- Clade: Pancrustacea
- Class: Insecta
- Order: Megaloptera
- Family: Corydalidae
- Genus: Corydalus
- Species: C. liui

Binomial name
- Corydalus liui Ardila-Camacho & Contreras-Ramos, 2018

Species of some of the largest insects

Corydalus liui is a species of dobsonfly found in Colombia.

== Diagnosis ==
=== Adult ===
The mandible of the male has reduced dentition, flagellum is dark brown. The male clypeus has divergent lateral projections, with the median projection well developed and medially incised. The forewing of both sexes with two pale "pterostigma-like" areas. The distal half of the wing, radial space, and area surrounding M fork with irregular areas alternated by pale- to dark brown suffusions. The female head is dark reddish-brown and the female mandible has a median protrusion contiguous to the basal tooth. The male genitalia with ectoproct and gonostylus 9 elongated, tube-shaped, slightly subclavate, gonostylus 9 with a small and short preapical claw. The ninth sternite is modified with a narrow posteromedian projection, curved dorsad and reaching to the middle of gonostyli 10. The posterolateral projections are well developed, broadened and subquadrate to a degree, sometimes cuved mesally. Fused gonocoxites 10 with anterolateral projections elongate and straight, posterolateral sides subquadrate, posterior margin straight. The gonostyli are somewhat elongated, blunt, sclerotized, and divergent. The male forewing length is 49.13–52.62 mm and the female forewing length is 48.43–57.65 mm.

=== Larva ===
The mandible is narrow, basal half yellow to pale brown, basal tooth closer to apex than base, third preapical tooth not completely fused to basal tooth. The submental projections are blunt and slightly surpassing the anterior margin of the mental plates (Platyneuromus, which have very similar larvae, have pointed submental projections that surpass the anterior margin of the mental plates). The area between the ocular region and frontal sclerite has a conspicuous subtrapezoidal yellow spot, and the area posterior to frontal sclerite has two subtriangular yellow spots. The sternellum is short and blunt with a few short and thick setae. The abdominal tergites are densely covered by scale-shaped decumbent microsetae, and scattered subclavate striated black macrosetae, medial region with numerous long and tapered pale brown setae. The lateral filaments are long and thickened, similar in shape and size on the different segments, except the lateral filament on the first abdominal segment which almost has half the length of all the other lateral filaments. All the rows of the lateral filaments have three thick rows of hair-like setae dorsally.

== Ecology ==
Larvae of this species have been collected in a small montane stream at an elevation of 1700 m a.s.l. in the Chipatá Municipality, Colombia. It was found alongside Corydalus armatus, which is likely a generalist regarding its microhabitat. However, C. liui was always found shaded and cold zones with shallow water flux, presence of submerged plant roots and decomposing leaves. They were generally found beneath flat fragments of sedimentary rock or in association with submerged plant meterial. Prepupae have been found under stones in very dry soil beside the water.

== Etymology ==
The specific epithet is a tribute to Xingyue Lui from China Agricultural University of Beijing, who has "extensively contributed to the knowledge of Megaloptera", according to the authors.
