= Dytiscus marginicollis =

- A time-lapse of a Dytiscus marginicollis metamorphosing from its larval stage to its adult stage

Scientific classification
- Kingdom: Animalia
- Phylum: Arthropoda
- Class: Insecta
- Order: Coleoptera
- Suborder: Adephaga
- Family: Dytiscidae
- Genus: Dytiscus
- Species: D. marginicollis

Binomial name
- Dytiscus marginicollis Leconte, 1844

Species of beetle

Dytiscus marginicollis, the giant green water beetle, is a species of predaceous diving beetle in the family Dytiscidae. It is found in North America.
