= Dytiscus dauricus =

Scientific classification
- Domain: Eukaryota
- Kingdom: Animalia
- Phylum: Arthropoda
- Class: Insecta
- Order: Coleoptera
- Suborder: Adephaga
- Family: Dytiscidae
- Genus: Dytiscus
- Species: D. dauricus

Binomial name
- Dytiscus dauricus Gebler, 1832

Synonyms
- Dytiscus vexatus Sharp, 1882

Species of beetle

Dytiscus dauricus is a species of predaceous diving beetle in the family Dytiscidae. It is found in North America and the Palearctic.

== Subspecies ==
These two subspecies belong to the species Dytiscus dauricus:

- Dytiscus dauricus dauricus Gebler, 1832
- Dytiscus dauricus zaitzevi Nakane, 1990
