= Corydalus armatus =

Scientific classification
- Kingdom: Animalia
- Phylum: Arthropoda
- Clade: Pancrustacea
- Class: Insecta
- Order: Megaloptera
- Family: Corydalidae
- Genus: Corydalus
- Species: C. armatus

Binomial name
- Corydalus armatus (Hagen, 1861)

Synonyms
- Corydalis armata Hagen, 1861 Corydalus quadrispinosus Stitz, 1914

Species of neotropical dobsonfly

Corydalus armatus is a species of dobsonfly found in the following countries: Argentina, Bolivia, Colombia, Ecuador, Peru, and Venezuela.

== Ecology ==
Larvae of this species have been found alongside Corydalus liui larvae. They have been found to inhabit different microhabitats. C. armatus was found in a wide variety of microhabitats in the small montane stream at 1700 m a.s.l., including under stones, logs, in decomposing organic material, and submerged roots. It was found in both sunny and shaded areas with lots of riparian vegetation. This all points to C. armatus being a generalist species.
