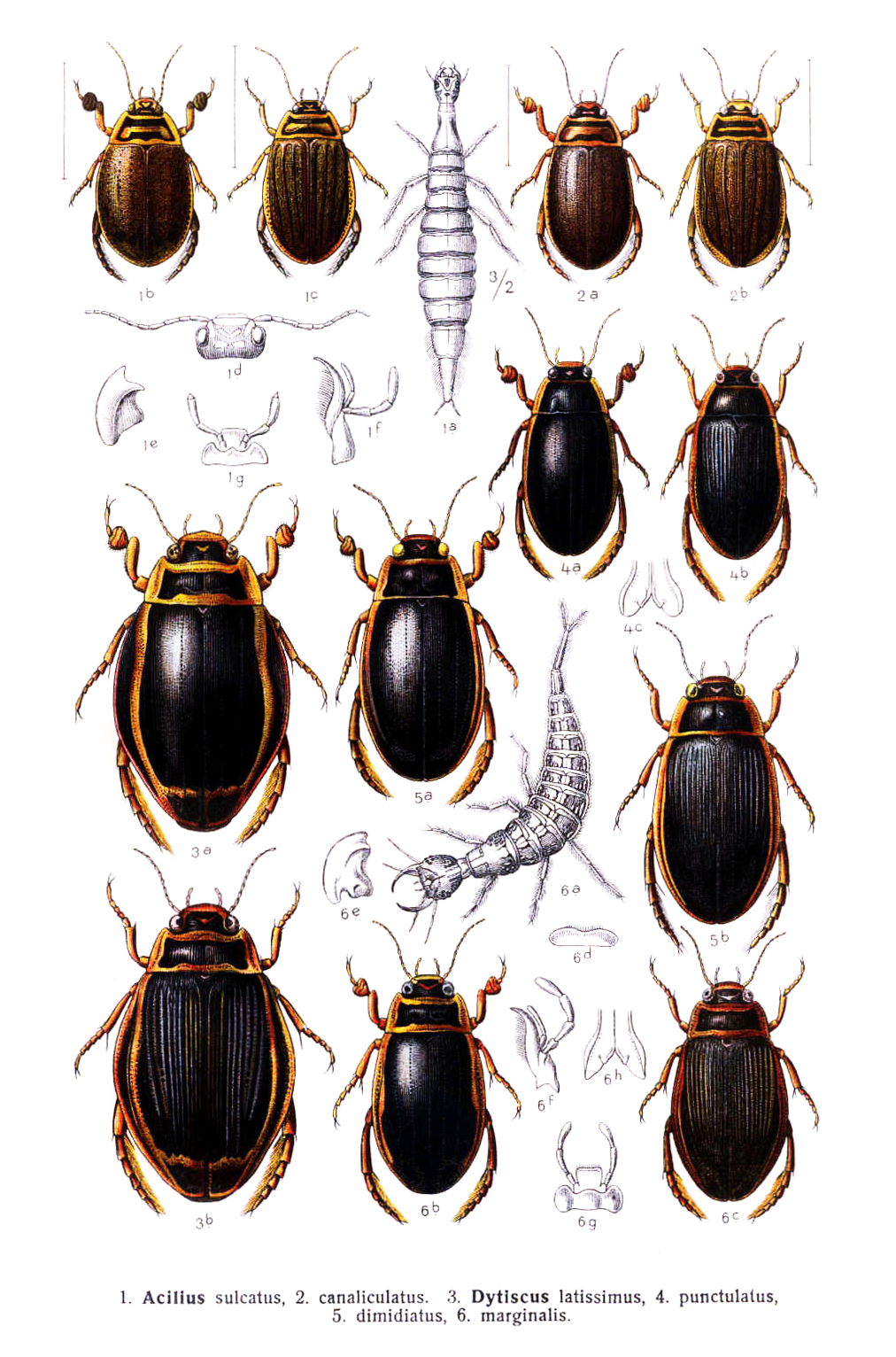
- No. 4 shows Dytiscus punctulatus F. synonym of D. semisulcatus O.F.Müller, 1776 (4a: adult male, dorsal view, 4b: adult female, dorsal view, 4c: hindcoxa appendages

Scientific classification
- Kingdom: Animalia
- Phylum: Arthropoda
- Clade: Pancrustacea
- Class: Insecta
- Order: Coleoptera
- Suborder: Adephaga
- Family: Dytiscidae
- Genus: Dytiscus
- Species: D. semisulcatus

Binomial name
- Dytiscus semisulcatus O.F.Müller, Zoologiae Danicae Prodromus, seu Animalium Daniae et Norvegiae Indigenarum characteres, nomina, et synonyma imprimis popularium, 1776

Synonyms
- Dytiscus punctulatus Fabricius, 1777; Dytiscus semisulcatus Mueller, 1776

= Dytiscus semisulcatus =

Brown-bellied great diving beetle

Species of beetle

Dytiscus semisulcatus, the brown-bellied great diving beetle , is an aquatic diving beetle native to Europe and northern Asia, and is particularly common in England. It is a large dark red-brown or black beetle, that can fly and lives near water.

== Taxonomy ==
The specific epithet 'semisulcatus' comes from two Latin words. Semi-, numerical prefix meaning "half" and sulcatus meaning “grooved” or "furrowed", which is in reference to the parallel grooves underneath the body of the beetle.

It is commonly known as Brown-bellied Great Diving Beetle, or Black bellied Great Diving Beetle. This is due to the dark colour of the under bellies of the beetles.

It was formerly known as Dytiscus punctulatus F.

It is listed in the Catalogue of Life.

== Description ==
It is a rather large insect. The larvae can grow up to 18 millimetres (0.71 in) in length, while the adults are generally 22–32 millimetres (0.87–1.26 in).

The basic anatomy of the D. semisulcatus is broken up into three separate functional body regions: the head, the thorax, and the abdomen. The entire body wall of the beetle is called the exoskeleton. The head houses the brain, eyes, antennae, and mouth parts. The eyes are compound eyes which are lens-like in appearance and have a pixel-like reception. They are made up of thousands of little receptors called ommatidia. The antennae are covered with many chemical receptors and act as sensory organs.

They are dark-coloured, with a black head and clypeus testaceous (or brick red in colour). The antennae are pale and short. The head of male beetles are finely punctured, while female beetles are more coarse. The pronotum (dorsal exoskeletal plate) is black.

Their back and wing cases (or elytra) are red-brick to black, with a pale outer margin (or epipleuron). The elytra on male beetles has 3 narrow grooves. The females have 10 furrows on the lower section. The wings are broad. The metasternum (belly plate) is rounded and black in colour.

They have slender legs that are dark brown to black and it has metatarsal claws.

== Distribution ==
It is found in Europe (ranging from North Africa to Southern Scandinavia and east to Turkestan) and in Northern Asia (excluding China).

== Habitat ==
It can be found in stagnant ponds and slow-moving clear water with much vegetation on the sides. They also can be found in peat bogs and among marginal sphagnum.

== Life history ==
From recorded sightings, it has been found that the beetle hibernates through the winter period in pond edge soils, then in early spring they reappear. They can mate from spring to autumn. The beetle reproduces by laying eggs, under water in the mesophyll of an aquatic plant leaf (such as Juncus articulatus), the incubation period is between 17 and 19 days long. Most of the eggs are laid in the autumn time, with the larvae developing through the winter. In the spring, normally around April fully grown larvae are found. The larvae are normally about 18 millimetres (0.71 in) in length. The larvae are known to feed exclusively on caddis fly larvae. The adults beetles may occur in large numbers where found and they known to be able fliers.

Before they dive, they collect air bubbles in their wing cases which goes through the spiracles. The jaws of diving beetles are strong compared to their body size.
