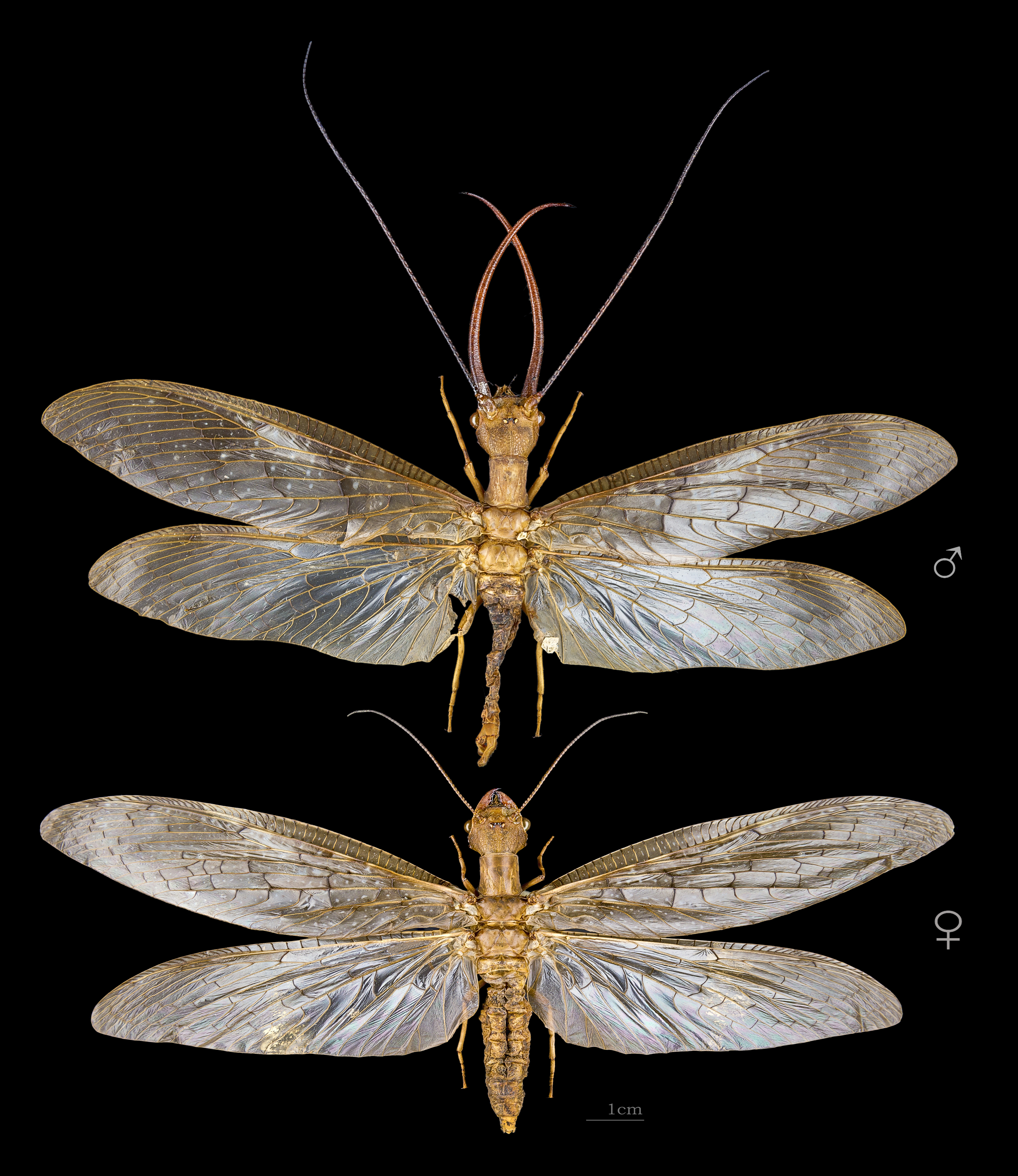
- Corydalus cornutus

Scientific classification
- Kingdom: Animalia
- Phylum: Arthropoda
- Clade: Pancrustacea
- Class: Insecta
- Order: Megaloptera
- Family: Corydalidae
- Subfamily: Corydalinae
- Genus: Corydalus; Latreille, 1802

Species
- see text

= Corydalus =

Genus of insects

Corydalus is a genus of large flying insects in the Corydalidae family, commonly known as dobsonflies. They are endemic to North, Central and South America and there are about 40 known species. Members of the genus have wing lengths of up to 85 millimetres. They are sexually dimorphic, with the males having large mandibles used to grasp the females during mating while the females have smaller jaws. The larvae are known as hellgrammites and are aquatic predators.

== Diagnosis ==
=== Adults ===
The adults of this genus can be separated from all other Neotropical dobsonflies by having four palpomeres (palpal segments) instead of three, though there are two South American species with only a partial subdivision in the last palpomere. Species in the genus vary much in size and may have a forewing length of 33.5–85.3 mm (1.32–3.36 in). They also show a lot of intraspecific variation in size.

=== Larvae ===
The larvae are similar to larval Platyneuromus, as both have mucle attachment scars on the head and thoracic nota. Once these are confirmed, the Platyneuromus and Corydalus can be separated based on small details found below.

Corydalus: Abdominal setae are erect, dark macrosetae which are either striated, inflated, and seemingly closed at the apex OR elongated and striated OR elongated and completely smooth. Often with short, blunt submental projections that do not go past the anterior margin of the mental plates, but some South American species have similar submental projections as Platyneuromus.

Platyneuromus: Abdominal setae are clear and either tubular and widened with an open apical portion OR thin, smooth and with an inconspicuous apical hole. Always with long and pointed submental projections that go past the anterior margin of the mental plates.

== Etymology ==
Corydalus is a transliteration from the Greek κορδαλος (korúdalos) meaning a crested lark or the flower, larkspur, apparently related to Greek corys (κορυς) a helmet crest. The name probably refers to the long mandibles of the male which might be considered to resemble the crest of a lark, or perhaps, the decorative crests of a helmet.

== Species ==
The following 41 (or 40) extant and extinct species are included as of 2026:

- Corydalus affinis Burmeister, 1839 - Argentina, Bolivia, Brazil, Colombia, Ecuador, French Guiana, Guyana, Paraguay, Peru, Venezuela
- Corydalus amazonas Contreras-Ramos, 1998 - Brazil
- Corydalus armatus Hagen, 1861 - Argentina, Bolivia, Brazil, Colombia, Ecuador, Peru, Venezuela
- Corydalus arpi Navás, 1936 - Brazil, Venezuela
- Corydalus australis Contreras-Ramos, 1998 - Argentina, Brazil, Uruguay
- Corydalus batesii McLachlan, 1867 - Bolivia, Brazil, Colombia, Ecuador, French Guiana, Guyana, Peru, Suriname, Venezuela
- Corydalus bidenticulatus Contreras-Ramos, 1998 - Mexico, Honduras USA (Arizona)
- Corydalus cephalotes Rambur, 1842 - Brazil
- Corydalus clauseni Contreras-Ramos, 1998 - Colombia, Costa Rica, Ecuador
- Corydalus clavijoi Contreras-Ramos, 2002 - Venezuela
- Corydalus colombianus Contreras-Ramos, 1998 - Colombia
- Corydalus cornutus (Linnaeus, 1758) - Eastern dobsonfly - Eastern North America, Canada
- Corydalus crossi Contreras-Ramos, 2002 - Venezuela
- Corydalus diasi Navás, 1915 - Argentina, Brazil, Paraguay
- Corydalus ecuadorianus Banks, 1948 - Ecuador
- Corydalus flavicornis Stitz, 1914 - Brazil, Colombia, Costa Rica, Ecuador, El Salvador, Guatemala, Honduras, Panama, Peru, Venezuela
- Corydalus flinti Contreras-Ramos, 1998 - Venezuela
- Corydalus hayashii Contreras-Ramos, 2002 - Venezuela
- Corydalus hecate McLachlan, 1866 - Brazil, Peru(?), Venezuela(?)
- Corydalus holzenthali Contreras-Ramos, 1998 - Bolivia, Peru
- Corydalus ignotus Contreras-Ramos, 1998 - Brazil, French Guiana
- Corydalus imperiosus Contreras-Ramos, 1998 - Argentina
- Corydalus liui Ardila-Camacho & Contreras-Ramos, 2018 - Columbia
- Corydalus longicornis Contreras-Ramos, 1998 - Argentina, Bolivia, Ecuador
- Corydalus luteus Hagen, 1861 - Southern United States, Mexico, Costa Rica, El Salvador, Guatemala, Honduras, Nicaragua, Panama
- Corydalus magnus Contreras-Ramos, 1998 - Costa Rica, El Salvador, Honduras, Guatemala, Mexico, Nicaragua
- Corydalus mayri Contreras-Ramos, 2002 - Venezuela
- Corydalus muzoensis Ardila-Camacho, 2014 - Colombia
- Corydalus neblinensis Contreras-Ramos, 1998 - Venezuela
- Corydalus nubilus Erichson, 1848 - Brazil, Colombia, French Guiana, Guyana, Venezuela
- Corydalus parvus Stitz, 1914 - Ecuador, Peru
- Corydalus peruvianus (Davis, 1903) - Argentina, Bolivia, Colombia, Costa Rica, Ecuador, Guatemala, Honduras, Nicaragua, Mexico, Panama, Peru, Venezuela
- Corydalus primitivus Van der Weele, 1909 - Argentina, Bolivia
- Corydalus ralphi Martins et al., 2022 - Venezuela
- Corydalus sophiae Ardila-Camacho & Contreras-Ramos, 2018 - Colombia
- Corydalus tesselatus Stitz, 1914 - Colombia, Venezuela
- Corydalus testaceus* (Le Peletier de Saint Fargeau & Audinet-Serville, 1828) - Indonesia
- Corydalus texanus Banks, 1903 - Southwest United States, Guatemala(?), Mexico
- Corydalus tridentatus Stitz 1914 - Brazil
- †Corydalus vetustus Oppenheim, 1888 - Late Jursassic - Germany
- Corydalus wanningeri Contreras-Ramos & von der Dunk, 2010 - Venezuela

*This is a doubtful identification because Corydalus is seemingly strictly a New World genus.
