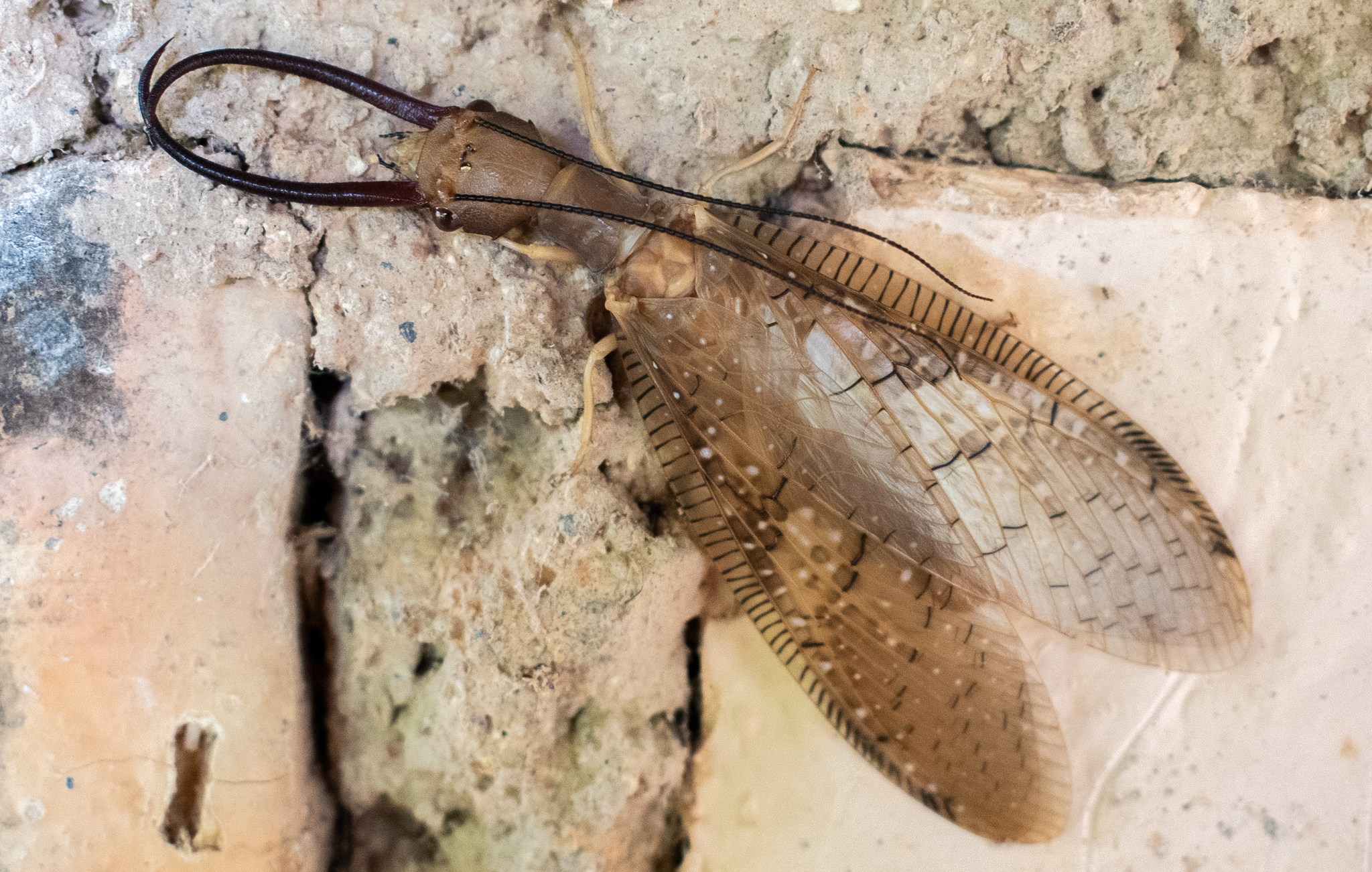
- male

Scientific classification
- Kingdom: Animalia
- Phylum: Arthropoda
- Clade: Pancrustacea
- Class: Insecta
- Order: Megaloptera
- Family: Corydalidae
- Genus: Corydalus
- Species: C. affinis

Binomial name
- Corydalus affinis Burmeister, 1839

= Corydalus affinis =

Species of insect

Corydalus affinis is a species of dobsonfly in the genus Corydalus. It is found in Argentina, Bolivia, Brazil, Colombia, Ecuador, French Guiana, Guyana, Paraguay, Peru, and Venezuela. It is found mainly in Amazonian lowlands.

== Diagnosis ==
The head is flattened with a subtle dark stripe behind the eye. The male mandibles are long with reduced dentition. Both sexes have thin, very dark thread-like antennae. The wing is brown with small pale dots. The ectoproct of the male genitalia is densely covered by fine setae, elongate and flattened at the apical ¼. The gonostylus 9 is similar to the ectoproct. The 9th sternite is shaped like a square with rounded edges (subquadrate). The gonostyli 10 are moderately convergent and are shaped somewhat like rounded rectangles being 2 times as long as wide. The length of the male forewing is 32.0–58.0 mm and the length of the female forewing is 38.6–61.6 mm.
