= Dytiscus hybridus =

Scientific classification
- Domain: Eukaryota
- Kingdom: Animalia
- Phylum: Arthropoda
- Class: Insecta
- Order: Coleoptera
- Suborder: Adephaga
- Family: Dytiscidae
- Genus: Dytiscus
- Species: D. hybridus

Binomial name
- Dytiscus hybridus Aubé, 1838

Species of beetle

Dytiscus hybridus is a species of predaceous diving beetle in the family Dytiscidae. It is found in North America.
