= Dytiscus caraboides =

Scientific classification
- Kingdom: Animalia
- Phylum: Arthropoda
- Class: Insecta
- Order: Coleoptera
- Suborder: Adephaga
- Family: Dytiscidae
- Genus: Dytiscus
- Species: D. caraboides

Binomial name
- Dytiscus caraboides Linnaeus, 1758

Species of beetle

Dytiscus caraboides is a species of beetle from the family Dytiscidae. The scientific name of this genus was first published in 1758 by Linnaeus.
