= Corydalus amazonas =

Scientific classification
- Kingdom: Animalia
- Phylum: Arthropoda
- Class: Insecta
- Order: Megaloptera
- Family: Corydalidae
- Genus: Corydalus
- Species: C. amazonas

Binomial name
- Corydalus amazonas Contrera-Ramos 1998

Species of insect

Corydalus amazonas is a species of dobsonfly in the genus Corydalus. It is endemic to Brazil.
