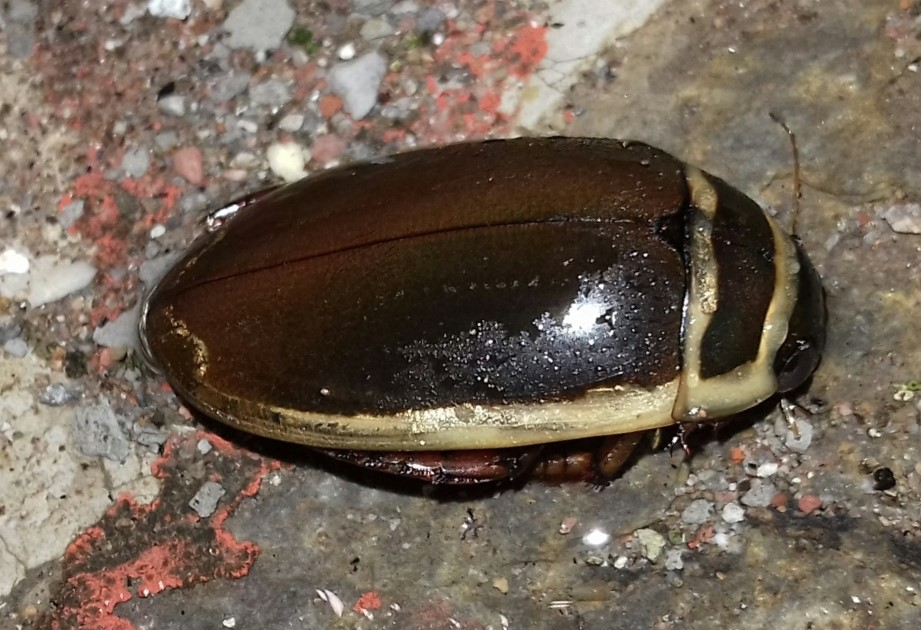

Scientific classification
- Domain: Eukaryota
- Kingdom: Animalia
- Phylum: Arthropoda
- Class: Insecta
- Order: Coleoptera
- Suborder: Adephaga
- Family: Dytiscidae
- Genus: Dytiscus
- Species: D. habilis

Binomial name
- Dytiscus habilis Say, 1830

= Dytiscus habilis =

Species of beetle

Dytiscus habilis is a species of predaceous diving beetle in the family Dytiscidae. It is found in North America from Oklahoma to Arizona south throughout Mexico to Guatemala; it is the only Dytiscus species found in the Neotropics.
