= Corydalus sophiae =

Scientific classification
- Kingdom: Animalia
- Phylum: Arthropoda
- Clade: Pancrustacea
- Class: Insecta
- Order: Megaloptera
- Family: Corydalidae
- Genus: Corydalus
- Species: C. sophiae

Binomial name
- Corydalus sophiae Ardila-Camacho & Contreras-Ramos, 2018

Species of dobsonfly

Corydalus sophiae is a species of dobsonfly found in Colombia. As of 2026, not much is known about this species, as it is known from a single male specimen.

== Diagnosis ==
The head is a dark reddish-brown and narrower than other species. The ridge behind the eye and spine are moderately developed. The male mandible with well-developed dentition, the inner margin is without protuberances and they are as short as what is typical for female specimens of related species. The forewing is strongly patterned (like C. colombianus and C. equadorianus). The forewing has lots of pale spots surrounded by brownish suffusions with varying darkness. The hindwings are more concolorous. The ectoproct of the male genitalia is short, slightly flattened and densely covered by setae. The basal half of this is subcylindrical, then it progressively narrows towards the tip (apex). The gonostylus 9 is elongate, a little longer than the ectoproct, distinctly subclavate (as opposed to tubular and digitiform in C. equadorianus) and is also densely covered by setae. The ninth sternite is subquadrate with posterolateral lobes slightly developed. The gonocoxites 10 are fused, forming a moderately sclerotized plate, with short anterolateral projections, with a rounded lone opposite to the gonostyli 10. The gonostyli 10 are papilliform, semi-membranous, short widely separated, slightly convergent and not surpassing the posterior margin of gonocoxites 10. The length of the forewing of the single known male is 59.26 mm.

== Etymology ==
The specific epithet is a tribute to Lauren Sophia, daughter of the first author (Adrian Ardila-Camacho). It is a noun in the genitive case (feminine).
