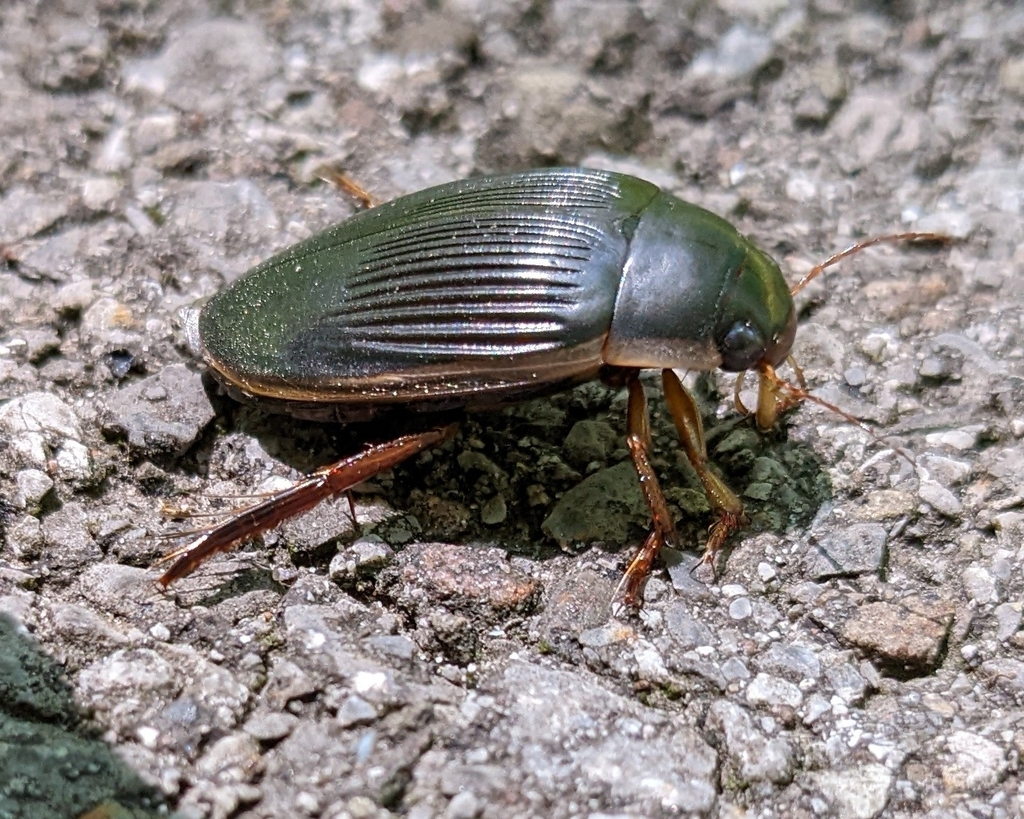
- Female

Scientific classification
- Domain: Eukaryota
- Kingdom: Animalia
- Phylum: Arthropoda
- Class: Insecta
- Order: Coleoptera
- Suborder: Adephaga
- Family: Dytiscidae
- Genus: Dytiscus
- Species: D. fasciventris

Binomial name
- Dytiscus fasciventris Say, 1824

= Dytiscus fasciventris =

Species of beetle

Dytiscus fasciventris, the understriped diving beetle, is a species of predaceous diving beetle in the family Dytiscidae. It is found in North America.
