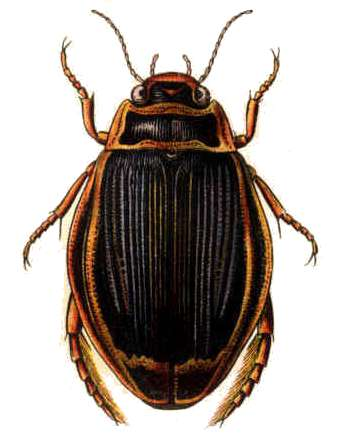
- D. latissimus

Scientific classification
- Domain: Eukaryota
- Kingdom: Animalia
- Phylum: Arthropoda
- Class: Insecta
- Order: Coleoptera
- Suborder: Adephaga
- Family: Dytiscidae
- Tribe: Dytiscini
- Genus: Dytiscus; Linnaeus, 1758

= Dytiscus =

Genus of beetles

Dytiscus ("little diver" based on Greek δυτικός, "able to dive" and the diminutive suffix -ίσκος) is a Holarctic genus of predaceous diving beetles that usually live in wetlands and ponds. There are 26 species in this genus distributed in Europe, Asia, North Africa and North and Central America. They are predators that can reduce mosquito larvae.

Dytiscus are large water beetles with a robust, rounded shape and they measure 2.2–4.4 cm (0.9–1.7 in) long depending on the exact species involved. The largest, D. latissimus, is among the largest species in the family and its size is only matched by certain Megadytes. The tarsi of the males are modified into suckers which are used to grip the female in mating. Females are usually larger than the males and come in two forms, with grooved (sulcate) or smooth elytra. Males only ever have smooth elytra. The adults of most species can fly.

== Life history ==
Adult beetles and their larvae are aquatic but the pupae spend their life in the ground. Females lay eggs inside the tissue of aquatic plants such as reeds. The eggs hatch in about three weeks.

The larvae (known as "water tigers") are elongate with a round and flat head and strong mandibles. They are predatory and their mandible have grooves on their inner edge through which they are able to suck the body fluids of their prey. The larvae take air from the surface of the water using hairs at the end of their abdomen. These lead to spiracles into which the air is taken.

Once the larvae grow to some size, they move to soil at the edge of water and burrow into a cell and pupate.

The adults breathe by going to the surface and upending. They collect air under their elytra and are able to breathe this collected air using spiracles hidden under the elytra.

In Dytiscus marginalis and other species the tarsus of the forelegs is modified in males to form a circular sucker. A reduced sucker is also seen in the midleg of the male.

== Parasitoids ==
Eggs of Dytiscus are sometimes parasitized by wasps of the families Eulophidae, Mymaridae and other Chalcidoidea.

== Species ==
Dysticus contains the following species:

- Dytiscus alaskanus J.Balfour-Browne, 1944
- Dytiscus avunculus C.Heyden, 1862
- Dytiscus caraboides Linnaeus, 1758
- Dytiscus carolinus Aubé, 1838
- Dytiscus circumcinctus (Ahrens, 1811)
- Dytiscus circumflexus Fabricius, 1801
- Dytiscus cordieri Aubé, 1838
- Dytiscus dauricus Gebler, 1832
- Dytiscus delictus (Zaitzev, 1906)
- Dytiscus dimidiatus Bergsträsser, 1778
- Dytiscus distantus Feng, 1936
- Dytiscus fasciventris Say, 1824
- Dytiscus habilis Say, 1830
- Dytiscus harrisii Kirby, 1837
- Dytiscus hatchi Wallis, 1950
- Dytiscus hybridus Aubé, 1838
- Dytiscus krausei H.J.Kolbe, 1931
- Dytiscus lapponicus Gyllenhal, 1808
- Dytiscus latahensis Wickham, 1931
- Dytiscus latissimus Linnaeus, 1758
- Dytiscus latro Sharp, 1882
- Dytiscus lavateri Heer, 1847
- Dytiscus marginalis Linnaeus, 1758
- Dytiscus marginicollis LeConte, 1845
- Dytiscus miocenicus Lewis & Gundersen, 1987
- Dytiscus mutinensis Branden, 1885
- Dytiscus persicus Wehncke, 1876
- Dytiscus pisanus Laporte, 1835
- Dytiscus semisulcatus (O.F.Müller, 1776)
- Dytiscus sharpi Wehncke, 1875
- Dytiscus sinensis Feng, 1935
- Dytiscus thianschanicus (Gschwendtner, 1923)
- Dytiscus verticalis Say, 1823
- Dytiscus zersii Sordelli, 1882
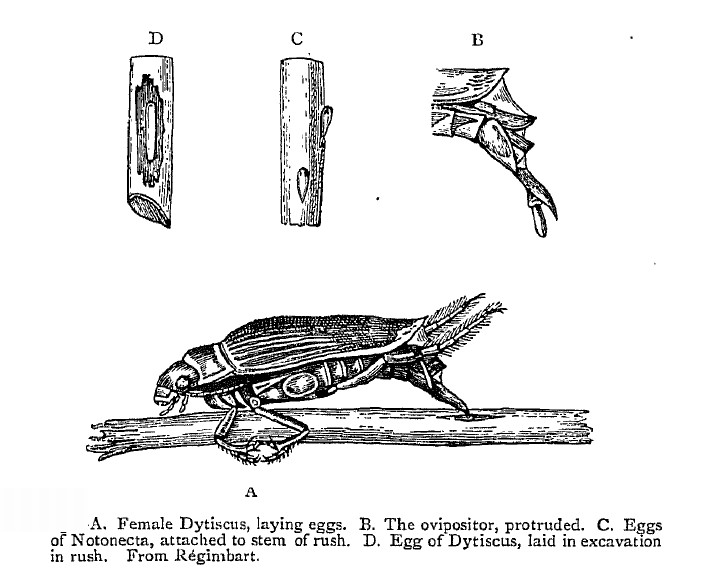
Eggs and egglaying

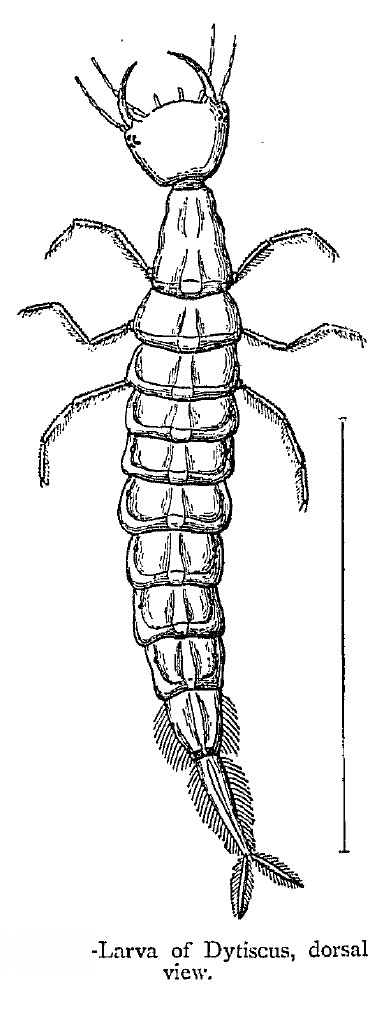
Larva

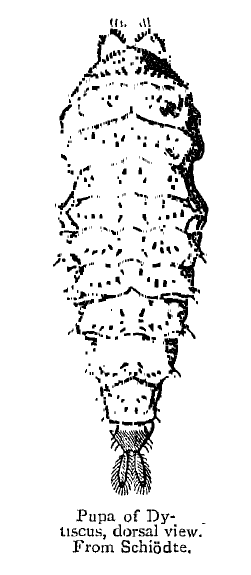
Pupa

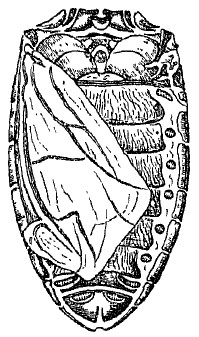
Spiracles under the elytra

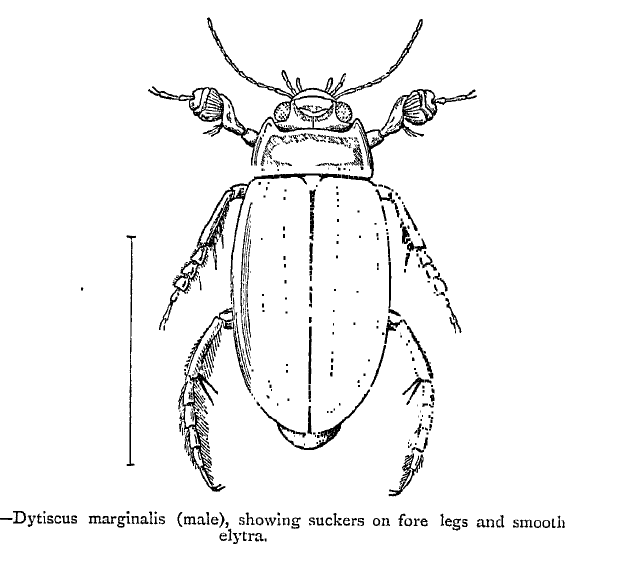
Male with suckers on fore tarsi

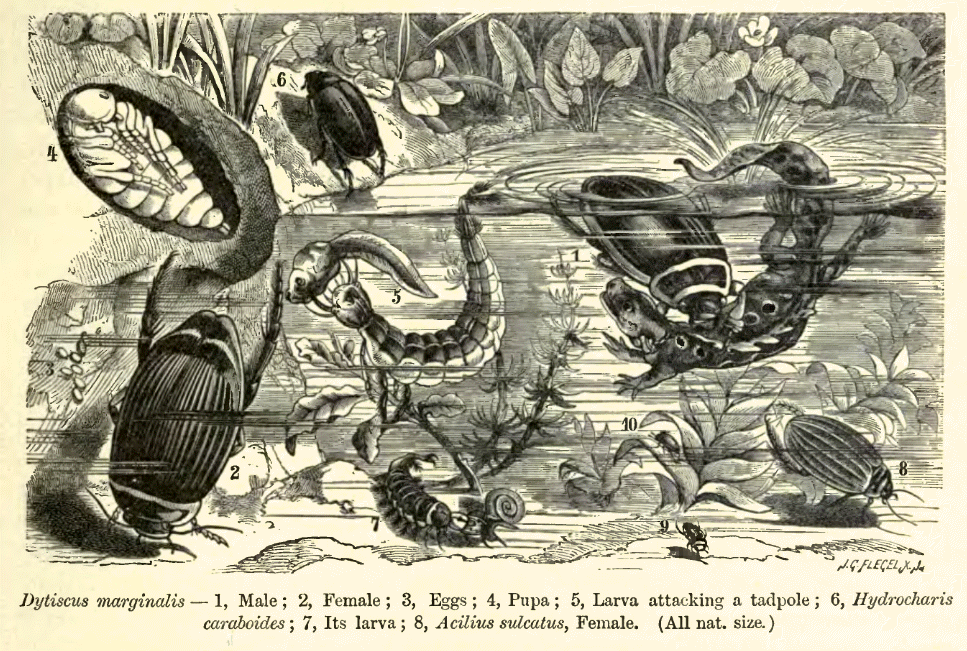
Life history
