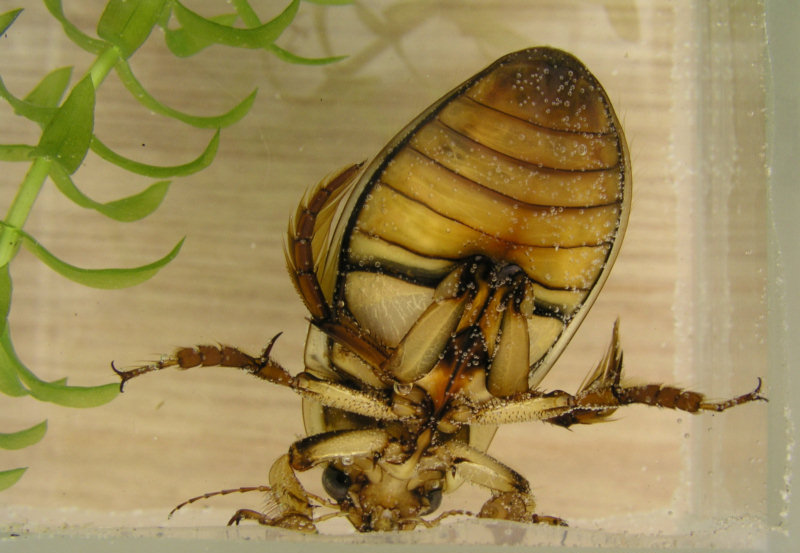
- Bottom view

Scientific classification
- Kingdom: Animalia
- Phylum: Arthropoda
- Clade: Pancrustacea
- Class: Insecta
- Order: Coleoptera
- Suborder: Adephaga
- Family: Dytiscidae
- Genus: Dytiscus
- Species: D. marginalis

Binomial name
- Dytiscus marginalis Linnaeus, 1758

= Great diving beetle =

Species of beetle

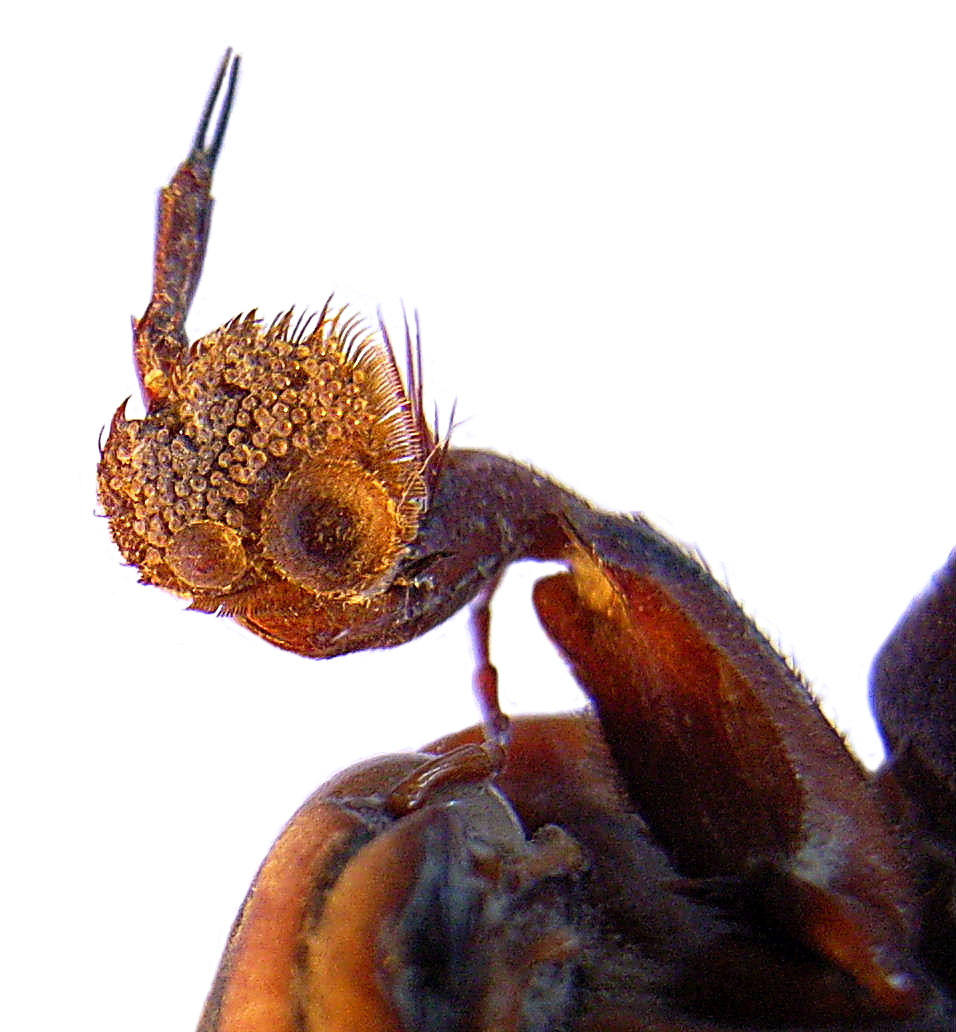
Male front leg from underside

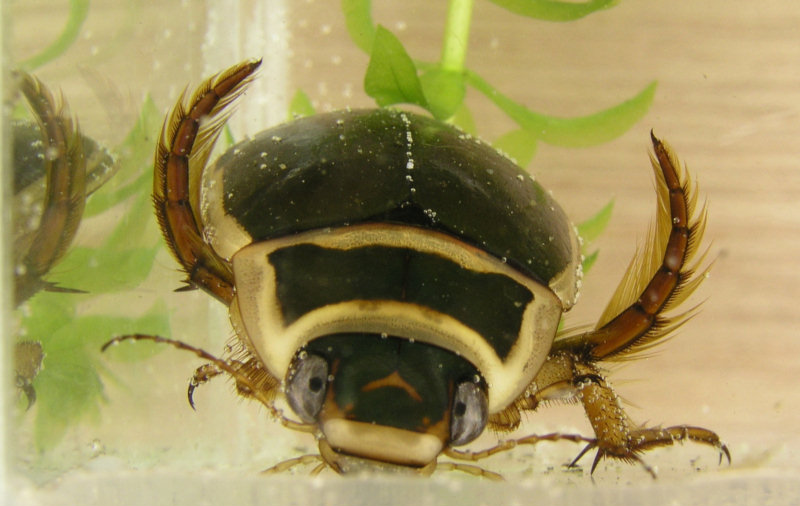
Adult

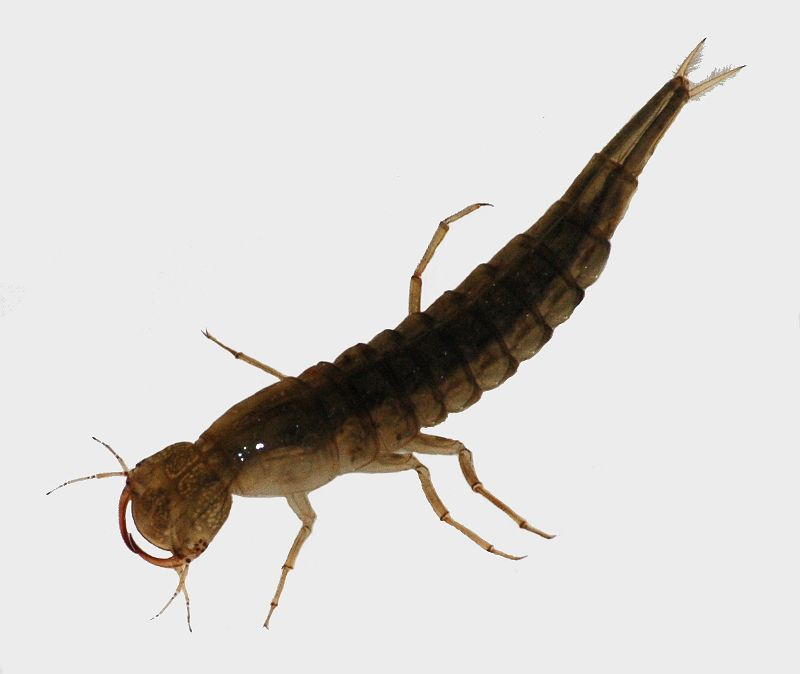
Larva

The great diving beetle (Dytiscus marginalis) is an aquatic diving beetle native to Europe and northern Asia, and in the UK is common in Wales, much of England and southern Scotland but less common on chalk and in the far north. The great diving beetle, true to its name, is a rather large insect. The larvae can grow up to 60 millimetres (2.4 in) in length, while the adults are generally 27–35 millimetres (1.1–1.4 in).

These beetles live in fresh water, either still or slow-running, and seem to prefer water with vegetation. They are dark-coloured (brown or green to black) on their back and wing cases (elytra) and yellow on their abdomen and legs. The male's wing cases are shiny, while those of the female are finely grooved. A voracious predator, this beetle hunts a wide variety of prey including small fish. The first two pairs of legs of the male are equipped with numerous suction cups, enabling them to obtain a secure grip while mating, and on their prey.

They are able fliers, and fly usually at night. They use the reflection of moonlight to locate new water sources. This location method can sometimes cause them to land on wet roads or other hard wet surfaces.

Before they dive, they collect air bubbles in their wing cases which goes through the spiracles. The jaws of a great diving beetle are strong compared to their body size.

The beetle reproduces by laying eggs under water in the mesophyll of an aquatic plant leaf. The incubation period is between 17 and 19 days.
