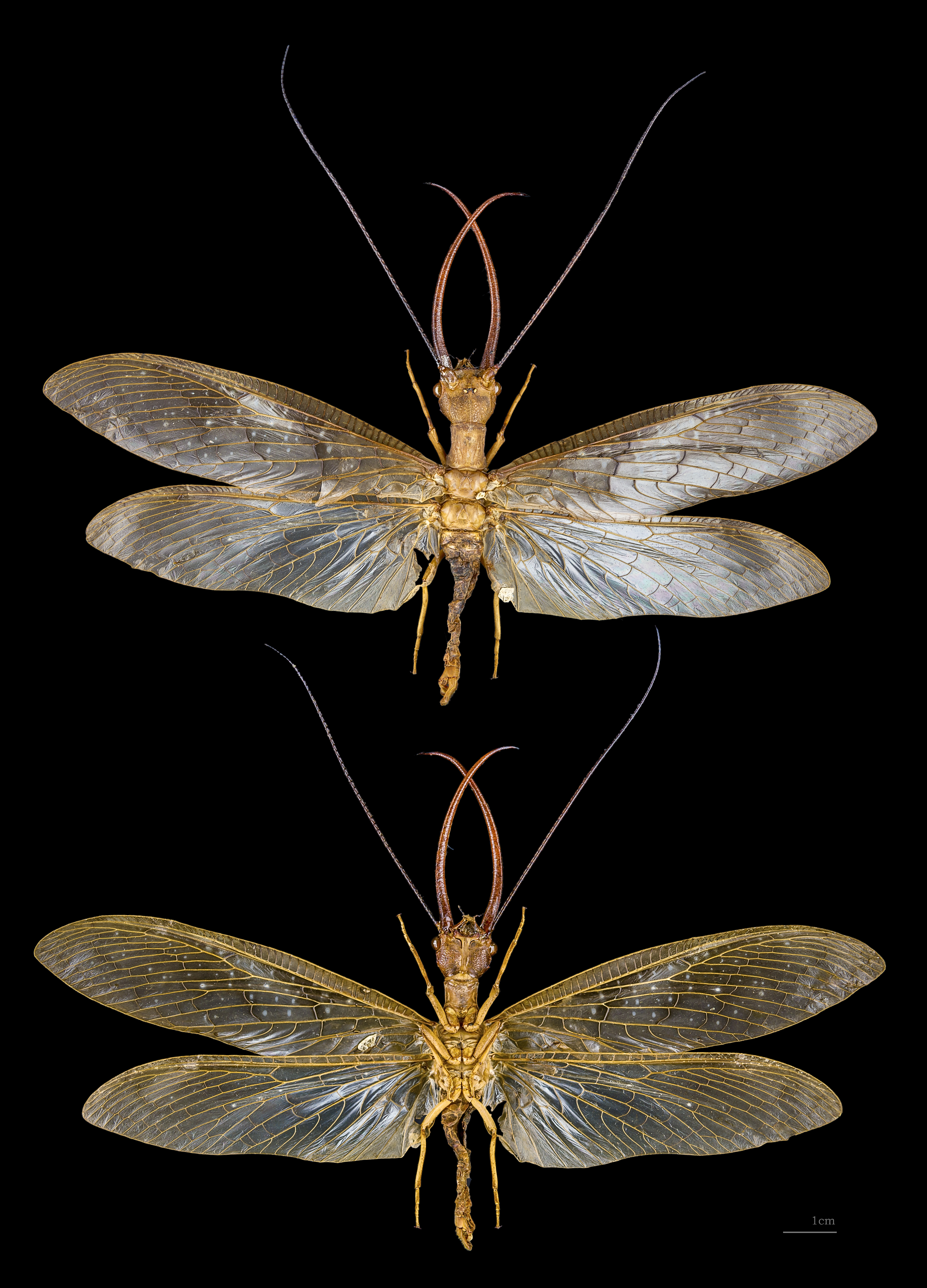
- Mounted male specimen (dorsal view at top, ventral on bottom)

Scientific classification
- Kingdom: Animalia
- Phylum: Arthropoda
- Clade: Pancrustacea
- Class: Insecta
- Order: Megaloptera
- Family: Corydalidae
- Genus: Corydalus
- Species: C. cornutus

Binomial name
- Corydalus cornutus (Linnaeus, 1758)

Synonyms
- Corydalus cognatus Hagen, 1861; Hemerobius cornutus Linnaeus, 1758; Raphidia cornuta (Linnaeus, 1758); Corydalus crassicornis McLachlan, 1867; Corydalus inamabilis McLachlan, 1867; Corydalus texana Banks, 1903; Corydalus texanus Banks, 1903

= Corydalus cornutus =

Species of insect

The eastern dobsonfly, Corydalus cornutus, is a large insect in the Corydalidae family. The larvae are known as hellgrammites and are among the top invertebrate predators in the streams in which they live, and are used by anglers as bait.

== Distribution ==
The eastern dobsonfly is found in most of eastern North America. It is usually found near the swift-flowing, unpolluted streams where its aquatic larvae develop.

== Common names ==
The origin of the word "dobsonfly" is unclear. John Henry Comstock used the term in reference to this species in his 1897 book Insect Life, but did not explain it. He also mentioned that anglers use the word "hellgrammite" for the aquatic larvae they used as bait, but the origin of this term is also unknown. These common names are still widely used for this and other species of corydalids, and essentially all that is known is that the earliest recorded uses appear to originate in the southern Appalachian region of the US (Kentucky, Tennessee, Virginia, West Virginia), where there were other archaic regional names and variants such as "helgamite", "hojack", "go-devil", and "grampus" (or "crampuss"), all with no definitive source or etymology. The latter name, "grampus", was used in the same region for a large aquatic salamander, the hellbender, that lives in the same habitat.

== Description ==
The eggs are grey and cylindrical, about 1.4 millimetres long and 0.5 millimetres wide. They are laid in groups of about 1,000, stacked in three layers. The pile of eggs is protected by a clear fluid which dries white and is applied by the female with the tip of her abdomen. The egg mass is said to look rather like a bird dropping.

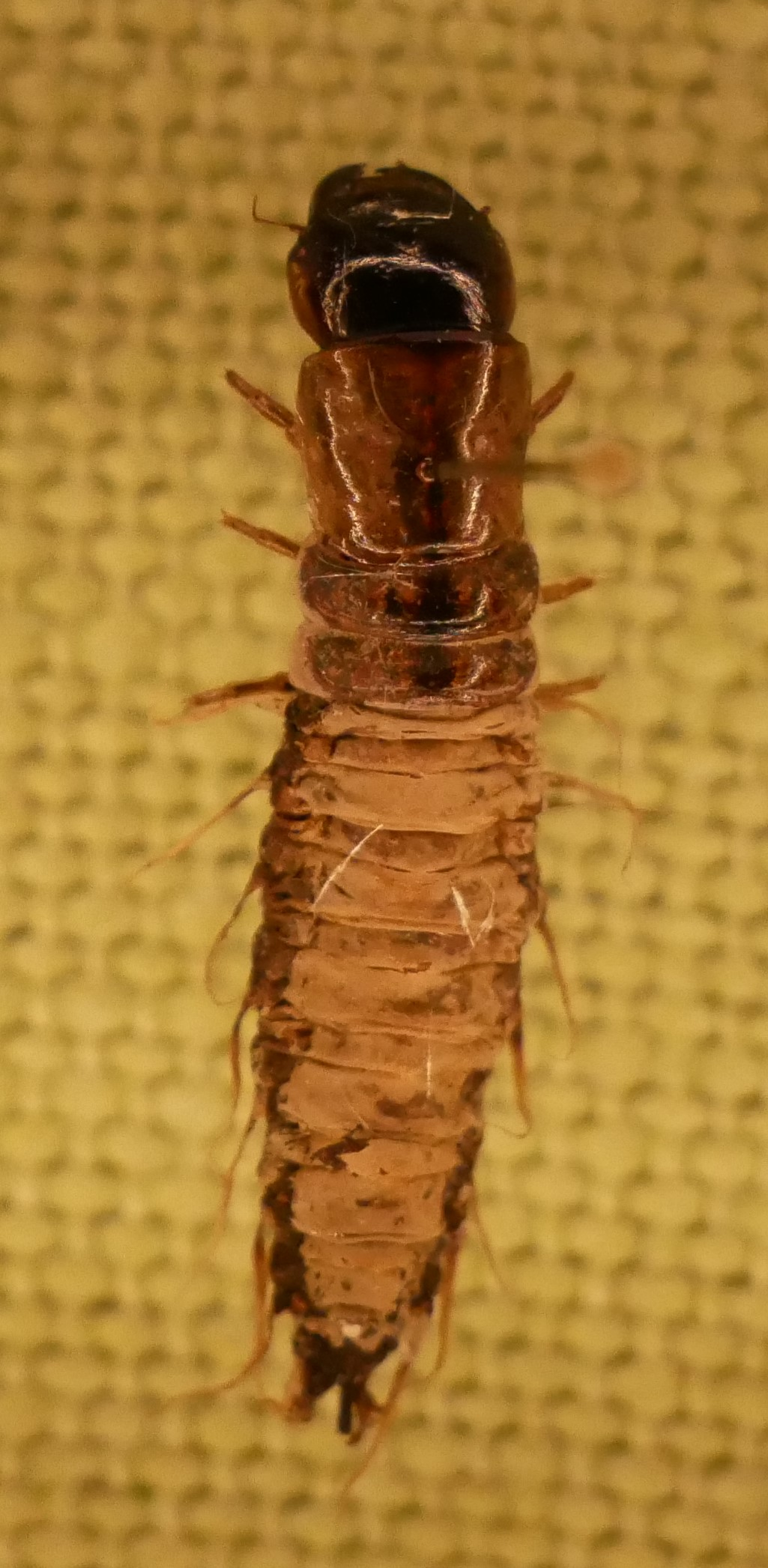
Corydalus cornutus larva, museum specimen

The larvae, which achieve lengths of up to 90 mm, are light brown with a covering of tiny dark brown microspines. The thorax has three pairs of legs and each segment is covered by a tough, dark-coloured dorsal plate. The first eight abdominal segments have lateral tactile filaments and the first seven have tracheal gills in tufts. The larvae also have spiracles allowing them to breathe on land as well as in the water. At the tip of the abdomen there are two prolegs, each with a dorsal filament and a pair of terminal hooks which enables the larva to anchor itself in fast-flowing water. The mandibles are sclerotised and powerful.

The pupae are orange in colour with dark patches on the upper side of the abdomen and are covered with minute bristles. The developing limbs, wings and antennae project outside the pupal covering.

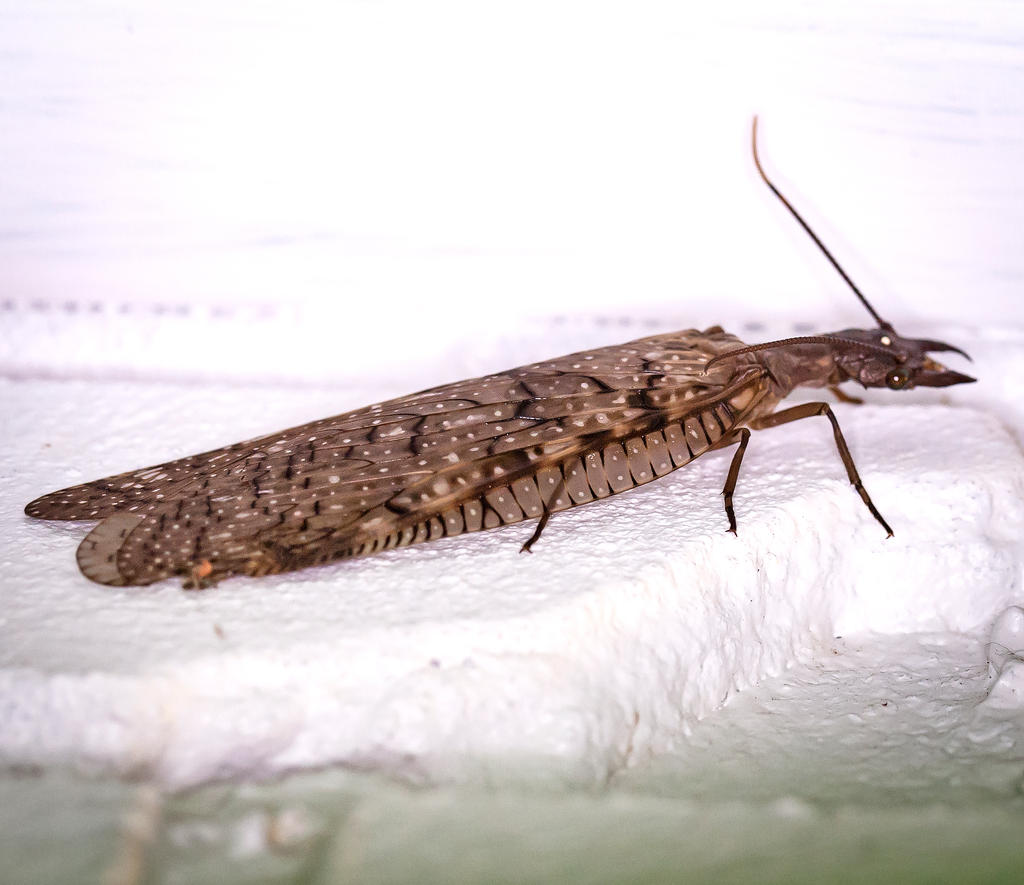
Eastern dobsonfly (Corydalus cornutus) female

The adult dobsonfly is a large insect up to 140 millimetres long with a wingspan of up to about 130 millimetres. The female has short powerful mandibles of a similar size to those of the larva while the mandibles of the male are sickle-shaped and up to 40 millimetres long, half as long as the body. The antennae are long and segmented and the greyish translucent, many veined wings are often mottled with white dots. When at rest the wings are folded flat over the insect's back and extend beyond the abdomen.

== Life cycle ==
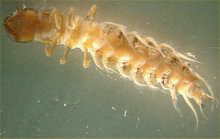
Larva

Dobsonfly eggs are usually laid close to the water's edge on a rock or overhanging foliage and hatch at night one to two weeks later. The newly emerged larvae fall or crawl into the stream and make their way to a fast-flowing section with a stony bottom. They are called hellgrammites and they hide under stones, catching and eating soft-bodied invertebrates. They grow slowly, shedding their skins ten to twelve times and reaching a length of up to ninety millimeters. The larger hellgrammites are fearsome predators with well-developed jaws. After one to three years and when ready to pupate, they emerge from the water and travel up to fifteen metres looking for a suitable location under a rock, log or leaf litter. There may be a mass emergence of hellgrammites within a few days of each other. Each one digs a hole in moist soil and prepares a small, smooth walled chamber, and after a prepupal stage of a few days, sheds their skin and pupates. In some areas the adults emerge in seven to fourteen days but in other areas they overwinter as pupae. On emerging, they dig their way to the surface. They are not thought to feed as adults but spend their time in dense vegetation near streams. They are most active at night and are attracted by lights. They mate and lay their eggs, usually dying within a week.
