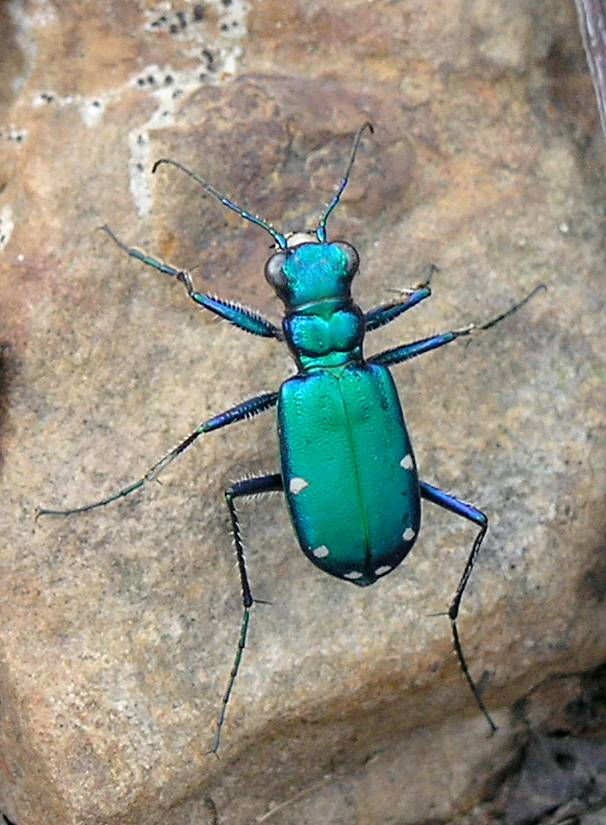

Conservation status
- Secure (NatureServe)

Scientific classification
- Kingdom: Animalia
- Phylum: Arthropoda
- Clade: Pancrustacea
- Class: Insecta
- Order: Coleoptera
- Suborder: Adephaga
- Family: Cicindelidae
- Genus: Cicindela
- Species: C. sexguttata

Binomial name
- Cicindela sexguttata Fabricius, 1775

= Cicindela sexguttata =

Species of beetle

The six-spotted tiger beetle, also known as the six-spotted green tiger beetle (Cicindela sexguttata), is a common North American species of tiger beetle in the Cicindelinae subfamily. It is common in many areas of the United States, and is well known. It is recognized for its bright green color and its flight pattern. The beetle is largely harmless to humans and may live as long as three years.

== Description ==
They are commonly found in deciduous forests in between Minnesota, southeastern Canada and south to eastern Texas, excluding the Florida Panhandle, and are easily recognizable by their large, white, overlapping mandibles. The adult is 12–14 mm (1/2-5/8") in length, and has fairly long legs. The mandibles give these attractive insects a ferocious appearance. While tiger beetles are voracious predators of small arthropods, they do not bite humans unless handled. Both the common name and the species name refer to the six small white spots on the beetle's metallic-green to metallic-blue-green elytra. This is not always the case, however, as some individuals may have more spots, fewer spots, or none at all, presumably due to genetic variation. This species is associated with wooded areas and they are often found in sunlit patches clear of undergrowth such as dirt paths and fallen logs where they hunt caterpillars, ants, spiders, and many other kinds of arthropods. Although tiger beetles are not gregarious, many beetles may sometimes be seen in one suitable hunting area. The female lays her eggs in sandy patches, and the larvae burrow into the ground after they hatch. Here they lie in wait until small arthropods pass by, at which time the larvae lunge out of their burrows at their prey. The beetles develop as larvae for about one year before pupating, and the insect has a total lifespan of just under five years.

== Gallery ==
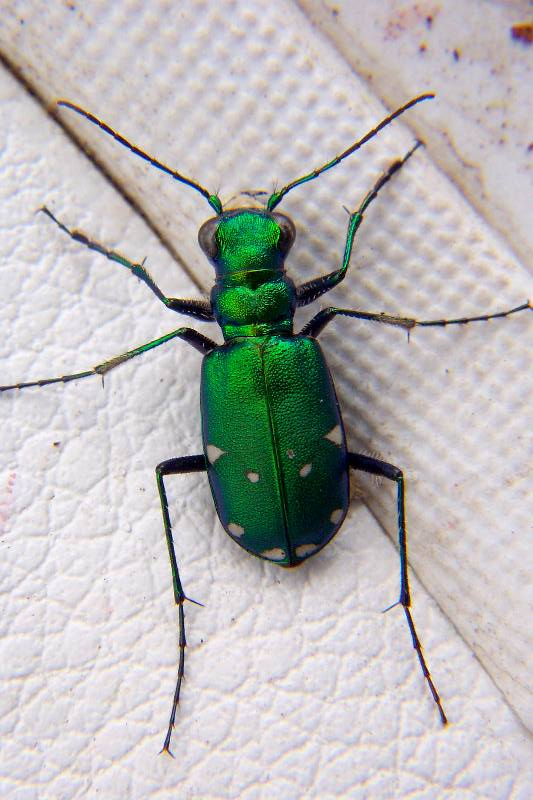
Adult

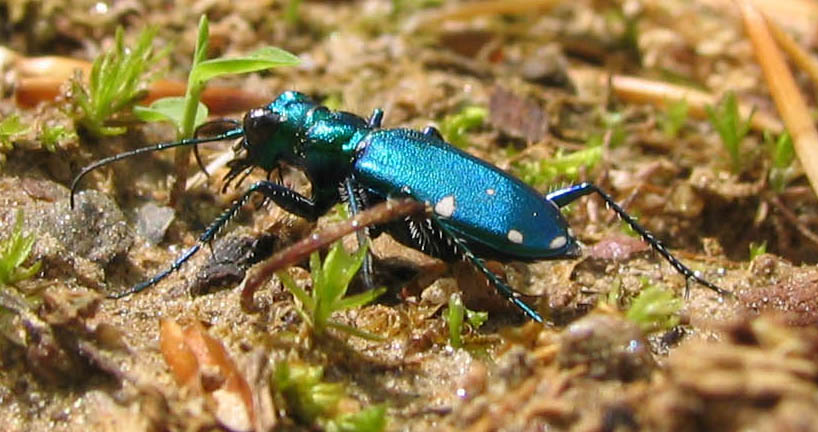
Adult

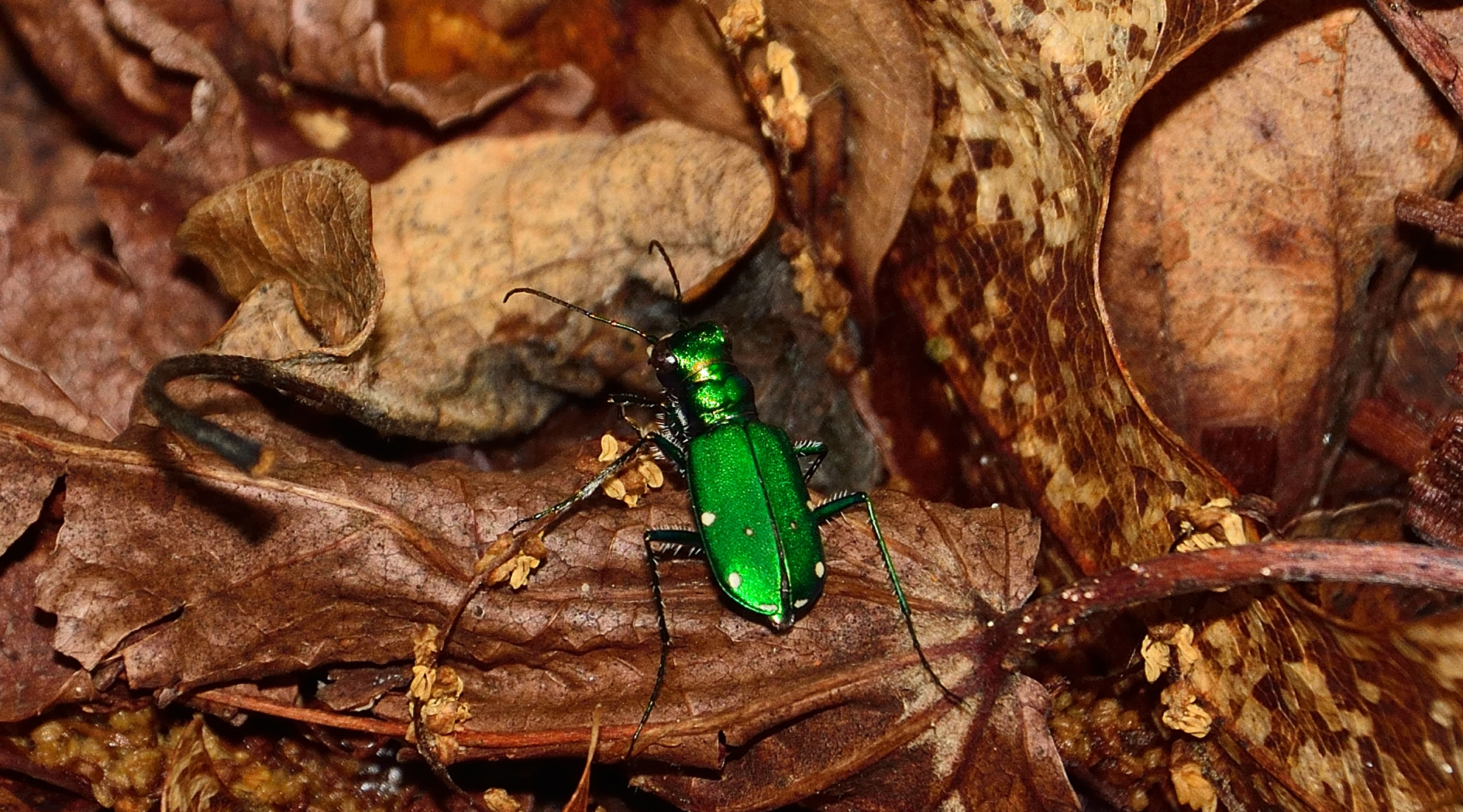
Adult, Belleplain State Forest, New Jersey

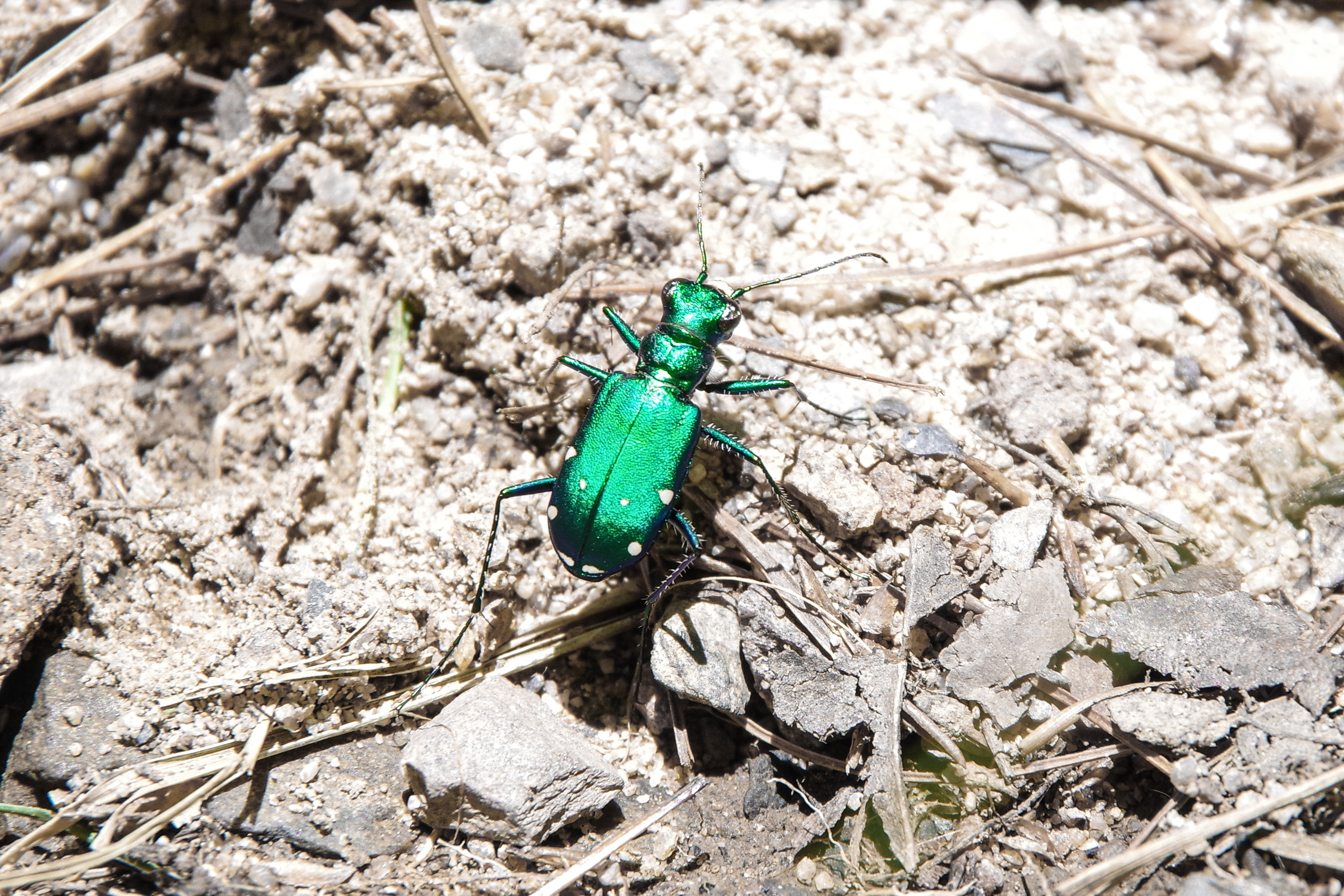
Adult, Great Smoky Mountains National Park, Townsend, Tennessee
