= Acanthacorydalis imperatrix =

Scientific classification
- Kingdom: Animalia
- Phylum: Arthropoda
- Clade: Pancrustacea
- Class: Insecta
- Order: Megaloptera
- Family: Corydalidae
- Genus: Acanthacorydalis
- Species: A. imperatrix

Binomial name
- Acanthacorydalis imperatrix Navás, 1917

Species of insect

Acanthacorydalis imperatrix is a species of dobsonfly found in Laos and Vietnam.

== Description ==
This species was described based on a single female specimen from Vietnam. Since then, more specimens have been collected, including at least one male. It is most similar to A. fruhstorferi and A. sinensis because of their large size and dark coloration. A. imperatrix has some yellow markings on the vertex of the head.
