= Van der Weele =

Van der Weele or Van der Weel is a Dutch toponymic surname meaning "from the weel". Weel is a Zeelandic form of Dutch wiel, a pool or small lake formed by a dyke breach. People with this name include:

- Herman Johannes van der Weele (1852–1930), Dutch painter
- Herman Willem van der Weele (1879–1910), Dutch entomologist, son of Herman Johannes
- Lilian Janse-van der Weele (born 1973), Dutch Reformed Political Party politician
- Fleur van der Weel (born 1970), Dutch illustrator
- Zoe van der Weel (born 1990), British-Norwegian handball player

== See also ==
- Van der Wiel, Dutch surname of the same origin
- Van de Wiele, Belgian surname of the same origin
