= Ger Blok =

Dutch football manager (1939–2016)

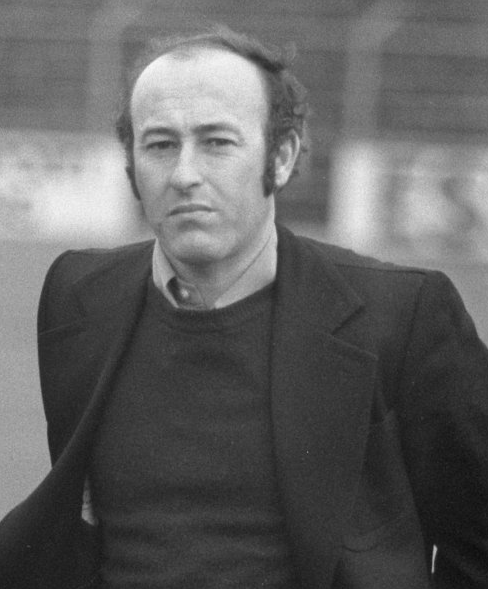
- Ger Blok in 1974

Personal information
- Full name: Ger Blok
- Date of birth: 16 October 1939
- Place of birth: Amsterdam, Netherlands
- Date of death: 19 December 2016 (aged 77)
- Place of death: Anna Paulowna, Netherlands

Managerial career
- Years: Team
- 1971–1974: De Volewijckers
- 1974–1975: Netherlands Women
- 1987–1988: Honduras
- 1988–1989: RKC Waalwijk
- 1990: Mersin İdmanyurdu
- 1990–1991: Fenerbahçe (assistant)
- 1993–1996: Myanmar

Ger Blok (16 October 1939 – 19 December 2016) was a Dutch football manager.

== Managerial career ==
Blok was born in Amsterdam and supported Blauw-Wit as a child. Before becoming a manager, he was employed as a teacher in Bilthoven. At the age of 29, Blok became the manager of amateur side SVM. In 1971, he started managing professional club De Volewijckers. In 1974, after De Volewijckers merged with FC Amsterdam, Blok found employment with the Royal Dutch Football Association (KNVB), managing the Netherlands women's national football team between 1974 and 1975 and several national youth teams between 1975 and 1985. With the under-20 team, he secured qualification for the 1983 FIFA World Youth Championship, but Kees Rijvers was chosen to coach the team during the tournament.

In 1987, Blok became the manager of Honduras. He later reflected that the team had been good enough to qualify for the 1990 FIFA World Cup, but this did not come to be. He subsequently returned to the Netherlands, where, in the summer of 1988, he was appointed as manager of newly promoted Eredivisie club RKC Waalwijk. However, after half a season, he was sacked and replaced by Leo van Veen. He then moved to Turkey, working as manager of Mersin İdmanyurdu between January and May 1990 and as assistant of Guus Hiddink at Fenerbahçe S.K. during the 1990–91 season. He also coached Myanmar, between 1993 and 1996.

== Later life ==
Shortly after finishing his coaching job in Myanmar, Blok was in an accident (a fall from stairs), which caused him to become paraplegic and in need of a wheelchair. In 2005, he said that he remained an ardent follower of football. In June 2012, he commented on the selection policy of then-Netherlands head coach Bert van Marwijk.

Blok died of leukaemia at his home in 2016, he was 77 years old.
