= Acanthacorydalis horrenda =

Scientific classification
- Kingdom: Animalia
- Phylum: Arthropoda
- Clade: Pancrustacea
- Class: Insecta
- Order: Megaloptera
- Family: Corydalidae
- Genus: Acanthacorydalis
- Species: A. horrenda

Binomial name
- Acanthacorydalis horrenda Navás, 1931

Species of insect

Acanthacorydalis horrenda is a species of dobsonfly endemic to India.

== Description ==
This species was described based on a single male specimen caught in April 1930. The type specimen is in good condition except for the wings being damaged at the edges, but it still has the abdomen attached and most important details are still intact. It is most similar to A. asiatica, as they have quite similar markings on the head and prothorax. The male genitalia are also quite similar. The basal tooth of the male mandible is not very developed in both species. Because of these similarities, it is hypothesized that they may be the same species. The length of the male forewing (holotype) is 76.5 mm.
