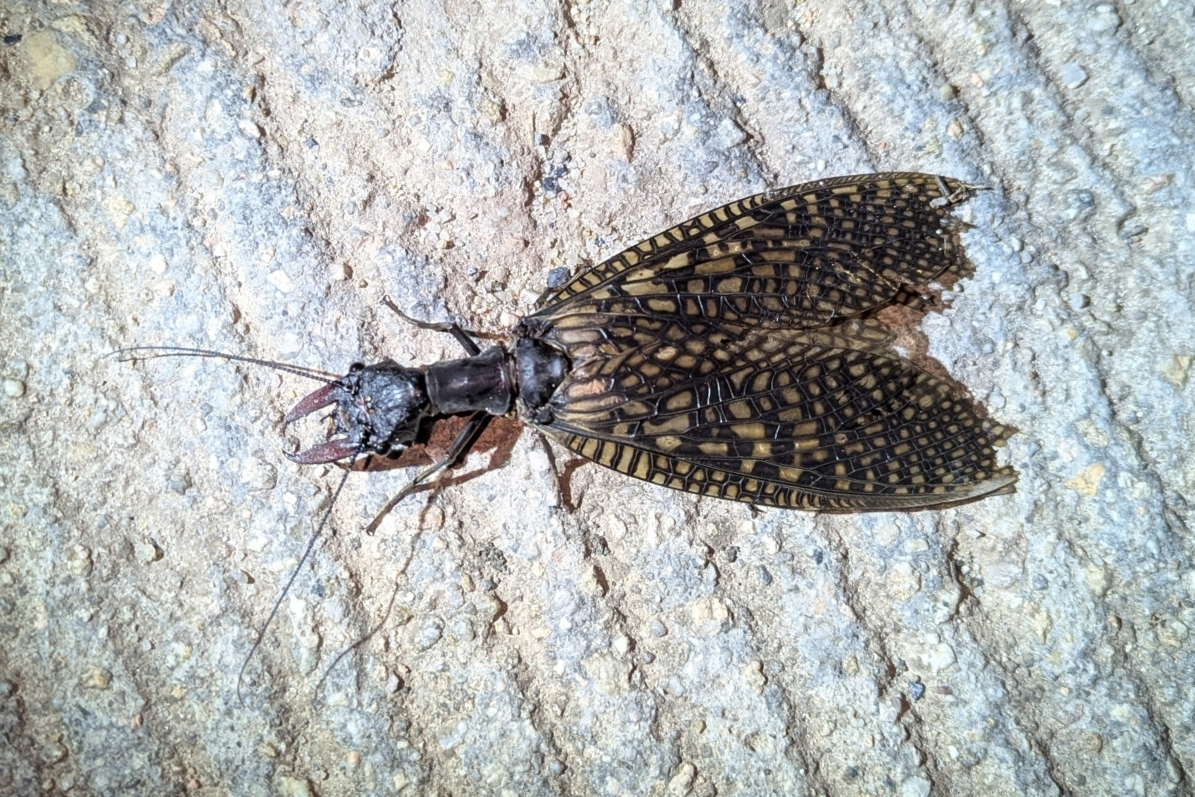
- Giant Chinese Dobsonfly (Acanthacorydalis fruhstorferi) in Qingyuan, China

Scientific classification
- Kingdom: Animalia
- Phylum: Arthropoda
- Clade: Pancrustacea
- Class: Insecta
- Order: Megaloptera
- Family: Corydalidae
- Genus: Acanthacorydalis
- Species: A. fruhstorferi

Binomial name
- Acanthacorydalis fruhstorferi van der Weele, 1907

= Acanthacorydalis fruhstorferi =

Species of insect

Acanthacorydalis fruhstorferi, commonly known as the Giant Chinese Dobsonfly, is a species of dobsonfly native to Vietnam and China. It holds the title of largest aquatic insect by wingspan according to the Guinness Book of World Records at 21.6 cm. The title formerly belonged to the Brazilian damselfly Microstigma rotundatum.

Acanthacorydalis fruhstorferi was first described by Herman Willem van der Weele in 1907 from a specimen from "Than-Moi" (probably in Lạng Sơn Province), Vietnam. It is found throughout Southern China (Fujian, Guangxi, Guangdong, Guizhou, Jiangxi, Yunnan, and Zhejiang) and Northern Vietnam.

Liu and associates proposed in 2005 that the species is most closely related to Acanthacorydalis sinensis citing morphological similarities relative to similar Chinese genera of Acanthacorydalis. Specifically the wing and body colouration, yet differed by A.sinensis's lack of sagittal dorsal division.

== Life Cycle ==
Eggs are deposited between stones near flowing water.

Larvae inhabit streams or rivers with low contamination. Larvae are sensitive to pH changes, with instances of A. fruhstorferi populations being reduced due to developments in urbanized locations such as Panzhihua, Sichuan. Typical of other dobsonflies, A. fruhstorferi larvae prey on aquatic insects, juvenile amphibians and small fish.

Adults display strong phototaxis and are often seen near waterside lamps. Adult A. fruhstorferi are not predatory, and instead feed on tree sap.

A. fruhstorferi individuals display sexual dimorphism. With both body and weapon size being different between sexes. Head size is not different between individuals of differing sexes, and nuptial gifts are smaller relative to other dobsonflies.

== Taxonomy ==
This is a phylogeny of the Chinese Acanthacorydalis species, following the most parsimonious tree in Liu et al., 2005.

- Acanthacorydalis
  - Acanthacorydalis orientalis
  - - Acanthacorydalis yunnanensis
    - - Acanthacorydalis unimaculata
      - - Acanthacorydalis fruhstorferi
        - Acanthacorydalis sinensis

== Etymology ==
The genus name Acanthacorydalis is assumed to be a combination of the Greek ακάνθα (acantha, thorny) with κορυδαλλις (corydallis, pertaining to κορυς, the crest of a helmet); the name was originally published without an etymology.

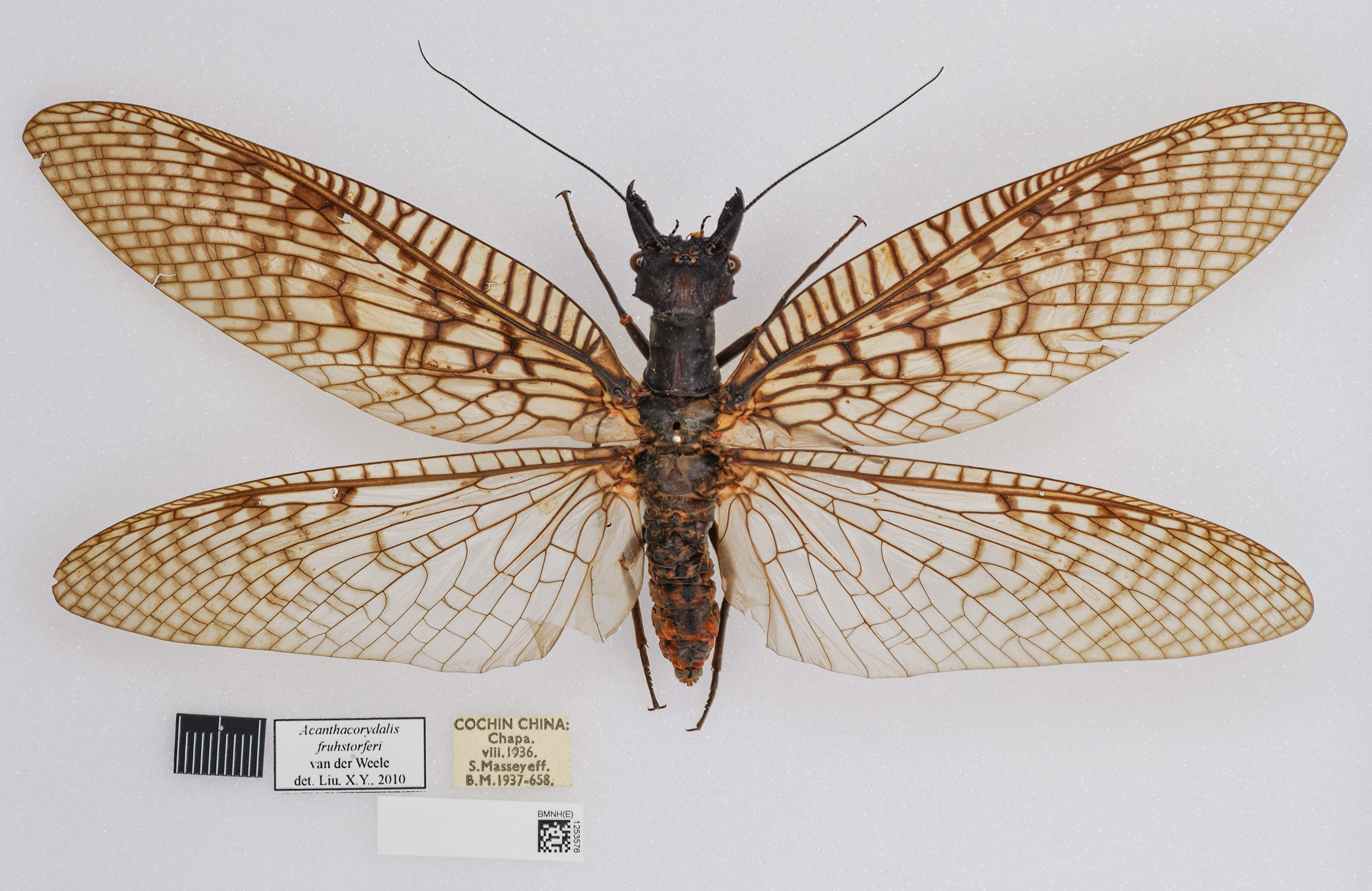
Female

The specific epithet fruhstorferi pertains to 19th century entomologist Hans Fruhstorfer.

== See also ==
- List of largest insects
