= Van der Wiel =

Van de Wiel or Van der Wiel is a Dutch toponymic surname meaning "from the wiel". A wiel is a pool or small lake formed by a dyke breach. Some of the variants (with # of people in 2007 in the Netherlands and in 2008 in Belgium) are Van de Wiel (3615, 195), Van der Wiel (2082, 42), Van de Wiele (40, 1522), Vandewiele (0, 1132), Van der Wiele (211, 7), and Van der Wielen (2323, 159). Notable people with these surnames include:

Van de Wiel

- Ad van de Wiel (born 1959), Dutch footballer
- Anouk van de Wiel (born 1992), Dutch handball player
- Jolijn van de Wiel (born 1992), Dutch actress
- Mark van de Wiel (born 1958), English clarinettist
- Willy van de Wiel (born 1982), Dutch darts player

Van der Wiel

- Gregory van der Wiel (born 1988), Dutch footballer
- Jan van der Wiel (1892–1962), Dutch fencer
- John van der Wiel (born 1959), Dutch chess grandmaster
- Jorinus van der Wiel (1893–1960), Dutch racing cyclist

Van der Wielen

- Jesper van der Wielen (born 1991), Dutch long-distance runner
- Suzan van der Wielen (born 1971), Dutch field hockey player

== See also ==
- Van de Wiele
- Van der Weele
- Wiel, given name and surname
