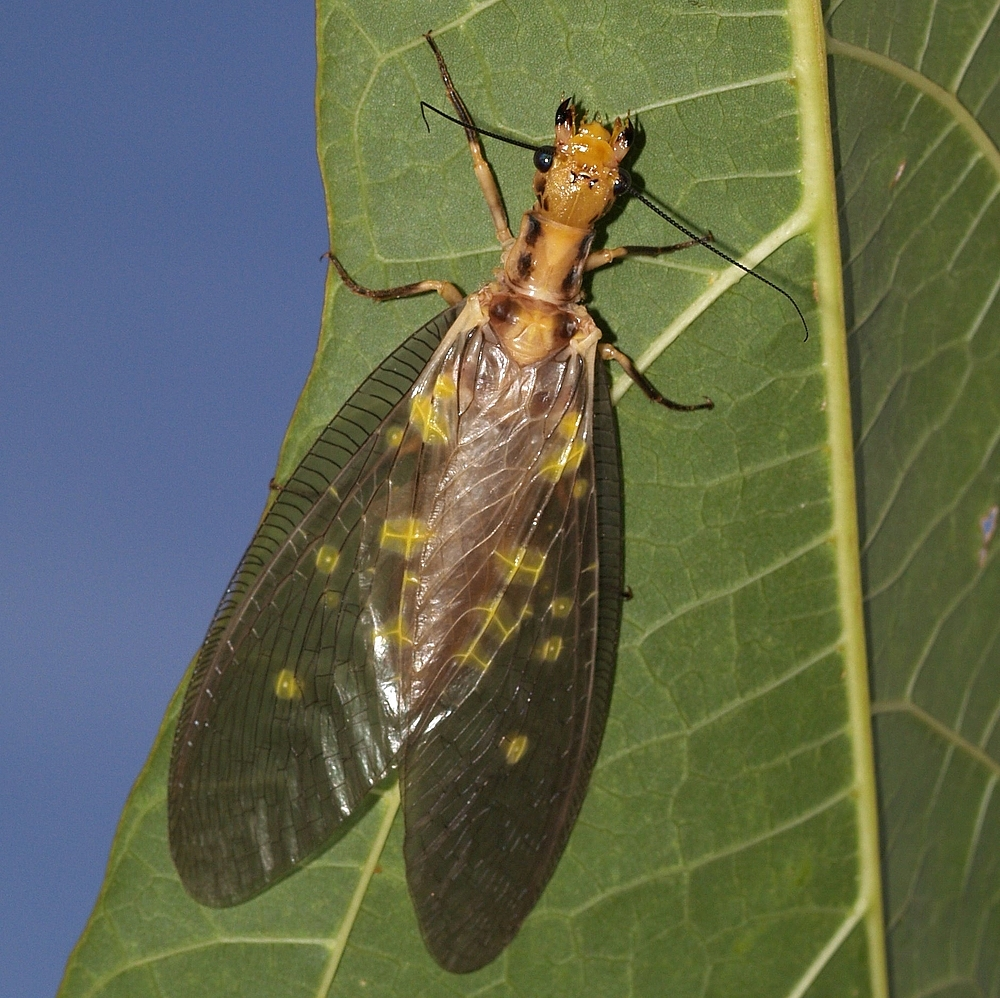
- Protohermes grandis

Scientific classification
- Kingdom: Animalia
- Phylum: Arthropoda
- Clade: Pancrustacea
- Class: Insecta
- Order: Megaloptera
- Family: Corydalidae
- Subfamily: Corydalinae
- Genus: Protohermes; Van der Weele

= Protohermes =

Genus of insects

Protohermes is a genus of dobsonflies in the family Corydalidae. Protohermes is the most speciose and widely distributed genus within Megaloptera, but up to 85% of species are restricted to small endemic areas in Asia. This endemism may be a result of an association with high elevation and high slope streams in Northern Vietnam and China.

== Description ==
Adult Protohermes generally have yellow coloration with white spots on the wings. The male genitalia are diverse across the genus and can be useful only for species-level identification, especially the shape and size of the tenth tergum and the subgenital plate at the ninth sternum. Nuptial gifts in Protohermes may as large as 20% of the total body mass of the male and can require up to 2 days to recover before mating again.

The size and phenology of larvae is closely tied to the availability of different sizes of prey. Dwarfism occurs in populations on islands and peninsulas as a result of fewer species of large prey, and maturation may be synchronous with prey in locations with seasonal variability. Larger larvae do not consume smaller prey, and they actively select prey as an ambush predator. Larvae are motionless 90% of the time during the day, but do change position on the stream bed during the night.

== Taxonomy ==
Protohermes contains the following species:

- Protohermes acutatus X.-y. Liu et al., 2007
- Protohermes albipennis (Walker, 1853)
- Protohermes arunachalensis Ghosh, 1991
- Protohermes assamensis Kimmins, 1949
- Protohermes axillatus Navás, 1932
- Protohermes basimaculatus X.-y. Liu et al., 2007
- Protohermes bellulus Banks, 1931
- Protohermes burmanus X.-y. Liu & Dvořák, 2017
- Protohermes cangyuanensis C.-k. Yang & D. Yang, 1988
- Protohermes cavaleriei Navás, 1925
- Protohermes changninganus C.-k. Yang & D. Yang, 1988
- Protohermes chebalingensis X.-y. Liu & D. Yang, 2006
- Protohermes concolorus C.-k. Yang & D. Yang, 1988
- Protohermes congruens X.-y. Liu et al., 2009
- Protohermes costalis (Walker, 1853)
- Protohermes costatostriatus (van der Weele, 1907) (=Neurhermes)
- Protohermes curvicornis X.-y. Liu et al., 2013
- Protohermes davidi van der Weele, 1909
- Protohermes decemmaculatus (Walker, 1860)
- Protohermes decolor Navás, 1931
- Protohermes dichrous (Brauer, 1878)
- Protohermes differentialis (C.-k. Yang & D. Yang, 1986) (=Neurhermes)
- Protohermes dimaculatus C.-k. Yang & D. Yang, 1988
- Protohermes disjunctus X.-y. Liu et al., 2007
- Protohermes dulongjiangensis X.-y. Liu et al., 2010
- Protohermes festivus Navás, 1932
- Protohermes flavinervus X.-y. Liu et al., 2009
- Protohermes flavipennis Navás, 1929
- Protohermes flinti X.-y. Liu et al., 2007
- Protohermes fruhstorferi (van der Weele, 1907)
- Protohermes fujianensis C.-k. Yang & D. Yang, 1999
- Protohermes furcatus X.-y. Liu et al., 2008
- Protohermes goodgeri X.-y. Liu et al., 2013
- Protohermes grandis (Thunberg, 1781)
- Protohermes guangxiensis C.-k. Yang & D. Yang, 1986
- Protohermes gutianensis D. Yang & C.-k. Yang, 1995
- Protohermes hainanensis C.-k. Yang & D. Yang, 1990
- Protohermes horni Navás, 1932
- Protohermes hubeiensis D. Yang & C.-k. Yang, 1992
- Protohermes hunanensis D. Yang & C.-k. Yang, 1992
- Protohermes immaculatus Kuwayama, 1964
- Protohermes impunctatus X.-y. Liu et al., 2008
- Protohermes infectus (McLachlan, 1869)
- Protohermes ishizukai X.-y. Liu et al., 2009
- Protohermes karubei X.-y. Liu et al., 2013
- Protohermes latus X.-y. Liu & D. Yang, 2006
- Protohermes lii X.-y. Liu et al., 2007
- Protohermes maculiferus (Walker, 1853) (=Neurhermes)
- Protohermes maculipennis (G. Gray in Cuvier, 1832) (=Neurhermes)
- Protohermes montanus (McLachlan, 1869)
- Protohermes motuoensis X.-y. Liu & D. Yang, 2006
- Protohermes niger C.-k. Yang & D. Yang, 1988
- Protohermes nigerescens (X.-y. Liu et al., 2015) (=Neurhermes)
- Protohermes ohli X.-y. Liu et al., 2013
- Protohermes orientalis X.-y. Liu et al., 2007
- Protohermes owadai X.-y. Liu et al., 2007
- Protohermes parcus C.-k. Yang & D. Yang, 1988
- Protohermes pennyi X.-y. Liu et al., 2009
- Protohermes piaoacanus X.-y. Liu et al., 2008
- Protohermes sabahensis X.-y. Liu et al., 2008
- Protohermes selysi (van der Weele, 1909) (=Neurhermes)
- Protohermes similis C.-k. Yang & D. Yang, 1988
- Protohermes sinensis D. Yang & C.-k. Yang, 1992
- Protohermes sinuolatus X.-y. Liu et al., 2009
- Protohermes sonus X.-y. Liu et al., 2013
- Protohermes spectabilis X.-y. Liu et al., 2008
- Protohermes stangei X.-y. Liu & Dobosz, 2019
- Protohermes stigmosus X.-y. Liu et al., 2007
- Protohermes striatulus Navás, 1926
- Protohermes sublunatus X.-y. Liu et al., 2013
- Protohermes subnubilus Kimmins, 1949
- Protohermes subparcus X.-y. Liu & D. Yang, 2006
- Protohermes sumatrensis (van der Weele, 1909) (=Neurhermes)
- Protohermes tenellus X.-y. Liu et al., 2007
- Protohermes tonkinensis (van der Weele, 1909) (=Neurhermes)
- Protohermes tortuosus X.-y. Liu et al., 2008
- Protohermes trapezius Li & X.-y. Liu, 2021
- Protohermes triangulatus X.-y. Liu et al., 2007
- Protohermes uniformis Banks, 1931
- Protohermes vitalisi Navás, 1919
- Protohermes walkeri Navás, 1929
- Protohermes weelei Navás, 1925
- Protohermes wuyishanicus Li & X.-y. Liu, 2021
- Protohermes xanthodes Navás, 1914
- Protohermes xingshanensis X.-y. Liu & D. Yang, 2005
- Protohermes yangi X.-y. Liu et al., 2007
- Protohermes yunnanensis C.-k. Yang & D. Yang, 1988
- Protohermes zhuae X.-y. Liu et al., 2008

Some authors recognize species-group assemblages within the genus (e.g.,), and other authors treat the genus Neurhermes as valid (these species are marked above), but are generally treated as Protohermes.
