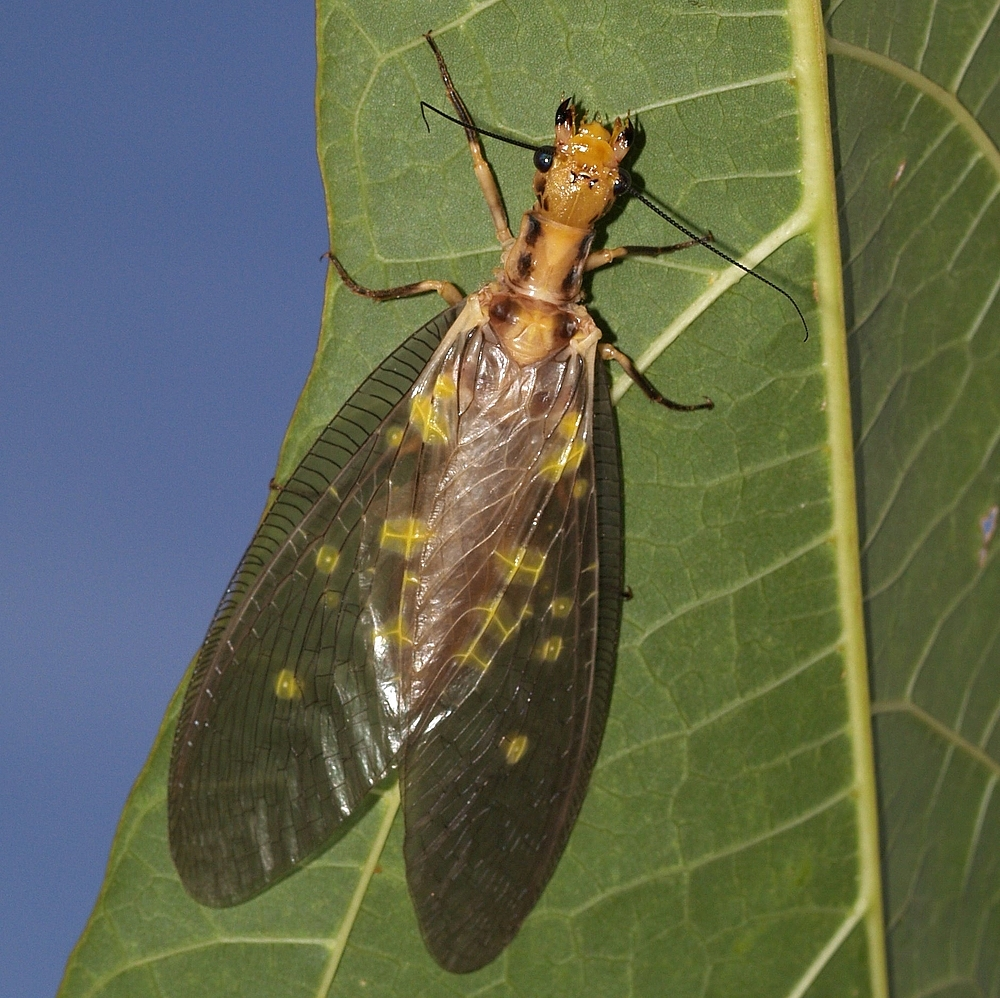
- Protohermes grandis

Scientific classification
- Kingdom: Animalia
- Phylum: Arthropoda
- Clade: Pancrustacea
- Class: Insecta
- Order: Megaloptera
- Family: Corydalidae
- Genus: Protohermes
- Species: P. grandis

Binomial name
- Protohermes grandis (Thunberg, 1781)

= Protohermes grandis =

Species of insect

Protohermes grandis is a species of dobsonfly occurring in China, Japan, Korea, and Taiwan, as well as South and North America, South Africa, Madagascar, Australia, and New Zealand. They are closely related to P. immaculatus. They are the biggest species of Protohermes fly.

== Ecology/Description ==
P. grandis flies live in various ecosystems, ranging from streams to flatlands to forests to mountains. Larvae live in clear water (ex. in streams). They range in length from about 36 to 40 millimetres long and have a skinny body with 4 large wings. The body is light yellow-brown in color, with the wings bearing yellow spots. They are nocturnal, flying at night and resting during the day.

== Life history/lifecycle ==
P. grandis, as well as all other megalopterans, have larvae that live in aquatic environments, most often freshwater environments. The larval life stage is fairly long (around 1 to 3 years), while the adult life stage is relatively short (around 4 to 7 days). The life stage duration varies depending on the type of aquatic environment they live in.

== Behaviors ==
=== Feeding/foraging ===
Adult P. grandis flies feed on the nectar inside Japanese chestnut flowers, usually at night. P. grandis fly larvae tend to eat larger prey as they grow and large larvae tend to avoid smaller prey, despite the fact that smaller prey can be found year-round. However, when only small prey are available to eat, the size of the P. larvae decreases as they enter the pupal stage of the lifecycle, resulting in dwarfism. P. grandis fly larvae utilize an "ambush" method of foraging, hiding and remaining motionless, which helps them avoid being attacked by predators.

=== Reproductive ===
Eggs laid by female P. grandis flies are coated with substances secreted from glands in the female fly. This prevents the eggs from being attacked by egg-eating predaceous animals such as ladybird beetles. The various colors of the substances secreted by the female flies aids in crypsis of the eggs, causing them to blend into the surroundings and making them harder for predators to detect.

== Reproduction ==
P. grandis flies are sexually dimorphic, with male flies possessing spermatophores that they attach to the female fly during copulation. This has a positive effect on reproductive output of the female fly. Male P. grandis flies do not possess enlarged mandibles used to fight other males, but the mandibles are present in other P. species. P. grandis flies require several days between subsequent matings, due to heavy investment of the spermatophore, compared to other species of Protohermes fly.

== Other uses ==
P. grandis flies are used to treat various lung, gut, and stomach problems. They also have been used in traditional Japanese medicine. Additionally, because P. grandis flies live in aquatic environments which are often polluted by things such as domestic sewage, they are used as indicators to assess water cleanliness in freshwater environments. They are also used to assess things such as heavy metal contamination in rivers. P. grandis flies are also sold in Japan as food souvenirs (zazamushi). As well, extract from P. grandis flies has been shown to benefit the reproduction of mice, resulting in increased litter sizes and increased survival of offspring.
