= Wiel =

Wiel is a given name and surname. Notable people with the name include:

== Given name ==
- Wiel Arets (born 1955), Dutch architect
- Wiel Bremen (1925–2014), Dutch politician
- Wiel Coerver (1924–2011), Dutch football manager
- Wiel Hendrickx (1908–1984), Dutch equestrian

== Surname ==
- Jade Wiel (born 2000), French racing cyclist
- Janken Wiel-Hansen (1868–1938), Norwegian-Swedish athlete, feminist, pioneer in fencing and swordsmanship.
- Kuoth Wiel, South-Sudanese-American model and actress
- Randy Wiel (1951–2025), Dutch former basketball player and coach
- Zander Wiel (born 1993), American baseball player

== See also ==
- Van der Wiel, surname
- Weil (surname)
