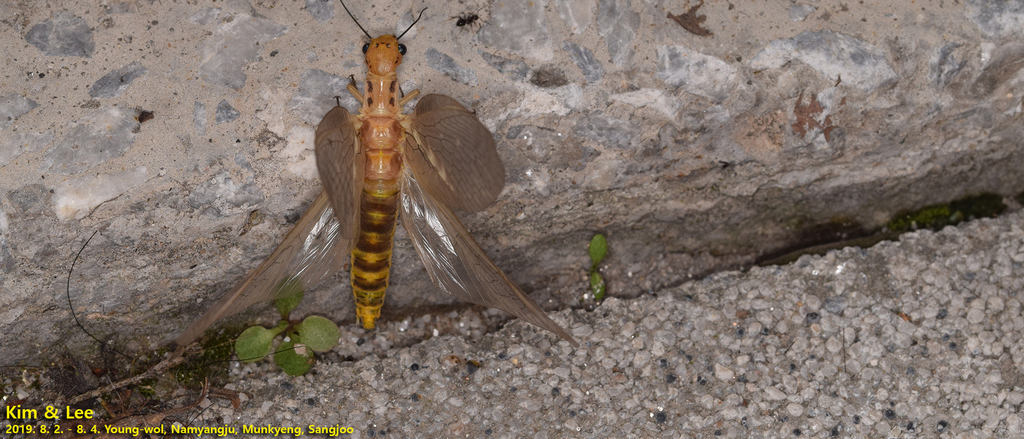
- Protohermes xanthodes

Scientific classification
- Domain: Eukaryota
- Kingdom: Animalia
- Phylum: Arthropoda
- Class: Insecta
- Order: Megaloptera
- Family: Corydalidae
- Genus: Protohermes
- Species: P. xanthodes

Binomial name
- Protohermes xanthodes Navás, 1914

= Protohermes xanthodes =

Species of insect

Protohermes xanthodes is a species of insect in the family Corydalidae. It is found on the Korean Peninsula, in Japan and China.

It was first described in 1914 by Longinos Navás.

The larvae live where humus has accumulated, in rivers with fast currents.
