= Acanthacorydalis orientalis =

Scientific classification
- Kingdom: Animalia
- Phylum: Arthropoda
- Clade: Pancrustacea
- Class: Insecta
- Order: Megaloptera
- Family: Corydalidae
- Genus: Acanthacorydalis
- Species: A. orientalis

Binomial name
- Acanthacorydalis orientalis (McLachlan, 1899)

Synonyms
- Acanthacorydalis orientalis (McLachlan, 1899); Corydalis orientalis McLachlan, 1899; Acanthacorydalis kolbei van der Weele, 1907

Species of insect

Acanthacorydalis orientalis is a species of giant dobsonfly endemic to China.

== Biology ==
This is the most common species of Acanthacorydalis in China and therefore also the best known. However, pollution of rivers and construction of hydroelectric dams are posing a significant threat to the populations of this species. It has completely disappeared from some areas from which it was previously known.

The larvae are found under large rocks in fast-flowing, well-oxygenated rivers.

== Taxonomy ==
Relationships between Acanthacordydalis orientalis and other members of the genus remain unresolved, and have differed between different phylogenetic analyses. Parsimony-based analysis of morphological characters and incorporating distribution data suggests that A. orientalis is sister to all other members of the genus. Analyses using mitochondrial DNA sequences indicate that A. orientalis is most closely related to A. sinensis, and analysis with both mitochondrial and morphological characters finds that A. orientalis is sister to a clade containing A. fruhstorferi and A. yunnanensis.
