= Van de Wiele =

Van de Wiele is a Dutch-language toponymic surname in Belgium meaning "from the wiel". A wiel is a pool or small lake formed by a dyke breach. Some of the variants (with # of people in 2007 in the Netherlands and in 2008 in Belgium) are Van de Wiel (3615, 195), Van der Wiel (2082, 42), Van de Wiele (40, 1522), Vandewiele (0, 1132), Van der Wiele (211, 7), and Van der Wielen (2323, 159). Notable people with the surname include:

- Aimée Van de Wiele (1907–1991) Belgian composer and keyboardist
- Daniel Van de Wiele (born 1956), Belgian boxing referee
- Eric Van De Wiele (born 1952), Belgian racing cyclist
- Iris Vandewiele (born 1994), Belgian volleyball player
- Isidoor Van De Wiele (1924–2010), Belgian sprinter
- Jan Van De Wiele (born 1948), Belgian racing cyclist
- Jef van de Wiele (1903–1979), Belgian Nazi politician
- Mieke Van De Wiele (born 1952), Belgian businesswoman

== See also ==
- Van de Wiel
- Van der Weele
