= Acanthacorydalis yunnanensis =

Scientific classification
- Kingdom: Animalia
- Phylum: Arthropoda
- Clade: Pancrustacea
- Class: Insecta
- Order: Megaloptera
- Family: Corydalidae
- Genus: Acanthacorydalis
- Species: A. yunnanensis

Binomial name
- Acanthacorydalis yunnanensis Yang & Yang, 1988

Species of insect

Acanthacorydalis yunnanensis is a species of dobsonfly endemic to China.

== Diagnosis ==
Of the Chinese species (except A. asiatica), A. yunnanensis is keyed out based on the following characters: The head and thorax with distinct yellow markings, body is brown to blackish, head with one pale yellowish spot around the ocellar triangle, male mandible with one subapical tooth.

== Taxonomy ==
This is a phylogeny of the Chinese Acanthacorydalis species (except A. asiatica), following the most parsimonious tree in Liu et al., 2005.

- Acanthacorydalis
  - Acanthacorydalis orientalis
  - - Acanthacorydalis yunnanensis
    - - Acanthacorydalis unimaculata
      - - Acanthacorydalis fruhstorferi
        - Acanthacorydais sinensis
