= Bjarn Zorgdrager =

Dutch footballer (born 2004)

Personal information
- Date of birth: 13 April 2004 (age 22)
- Place of birth: Terschelling, Netherlands
- Position: Right back

Team information
- Current team: RKC Waalwijk
- Number: 2

Youth career
- SC Terschelling
- 2019–2025: SC Cambuur

Senior career*
Years	Team	Apps	(Gls)
2025–	RKC Waalwijk	5	(0)
- * Club domestic league appearances and goals as of 15 April 2026

Bjarn Zorgdrager (born 13 April 2004) is a Dutch professional footballer who plays for Eerste Divisie club RKC Waalwijk, primarily as a right back.

== Youth career ==
Zorgdrager, who began his youth career at SC Terschelling, became a part of the SC Cambuur youth system at age 11, staying with a host family in Leeuwarden. In the season before he signed with Waalwijk, he played 26 of the 28 league games for Cambuur.

== Club career ==
After being relegated to the Eerste Divisie in the 2024–25 season, RKC Waalwijk sought to improve their defense. Waalwijk announced the signing of Zorgdrager from SC Cambuur in June 2025, after having already announced the signing of goalkeeper Xander Mulder from FC Twente.

However, injuries during the pre-season kept Zorgdrager recovering for several months. His debut for Waalwijk came on 20 October in a 1–2 victory against FC Dordrecht, where he was subbed out in the 46th minute due to injury concerns. In December 2025, a knee injury against VVV-Venlo left him out of the team for months.
