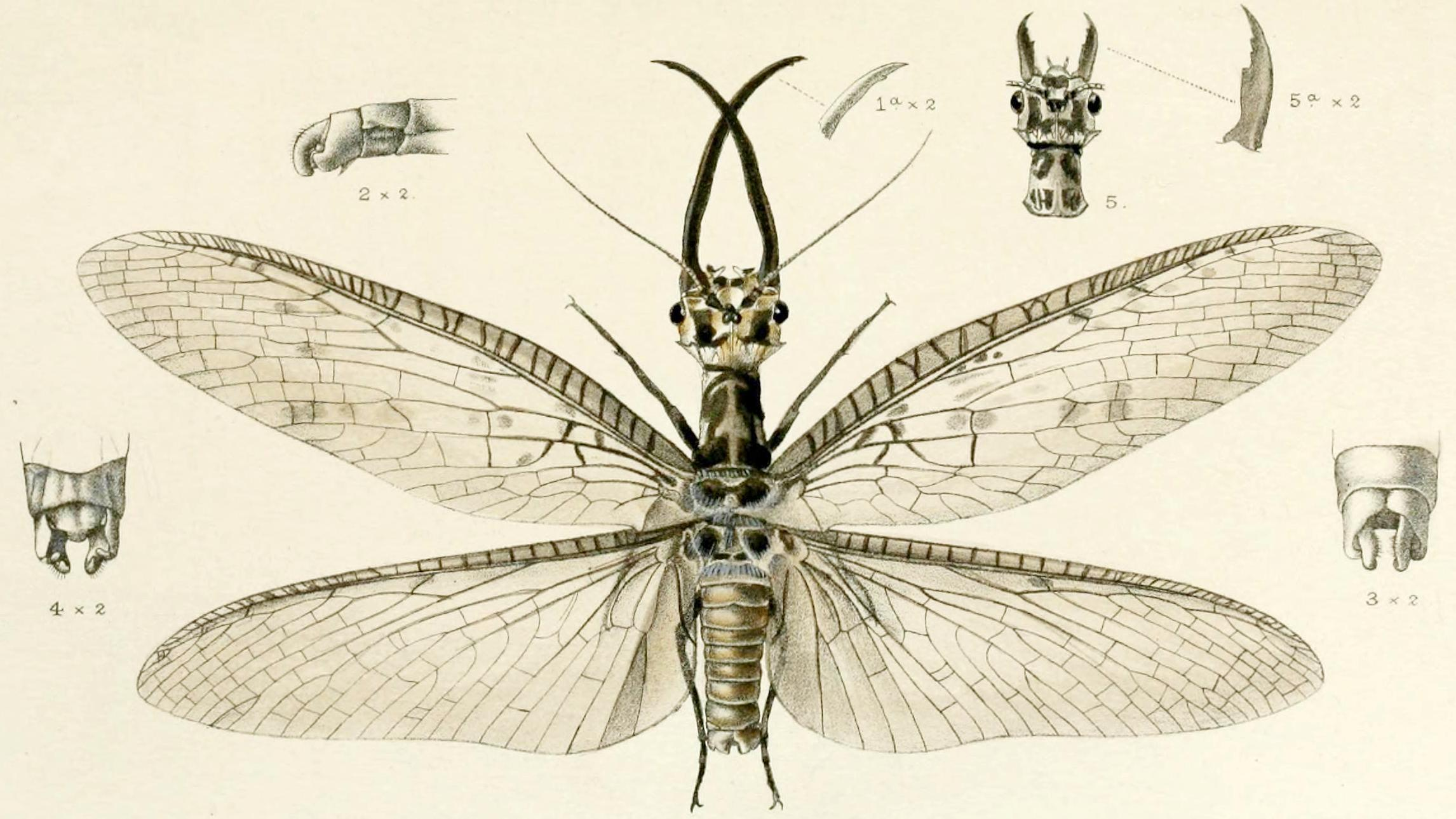
- Acanthacorydalis asiatica

Scientific classification
- Kingdom: Animalia
- Phylum: Arthropoda
- Clade: Pancrustacea
- Class: Insecta
- Order: Megaloptera
- Family: Corydalidae
- Subfamily: Corydalinae
- Genus: Acanthacorydalis; Weele, 1907

Type species
- Corydalis asiatica Wood-Mason, 1884

= Acanthacorydalis =

Genus of insects

Acanthacorydalis is a genus of insects belonging to the family Corydalidae.

The species of this genus are found in Southeastern Asia.

== Description ==
Members of this genus can be separated from all other genera by the following characters: The body is large, one pair of spines on the vertex, male mandibles more elongate, with one large inner basal tooth and one smaller aical tooth, and the costal crossveins in male forewings are reticulate medially.

== Species ==
The following eight species are included in this genus as of 2022:

- Acanthacorydalis asiatica (Wood-Mason, 1884)
- Acanthacorydalis fruhstorferi van der Weele, 1907
- Acanthacorydalis horrenda Navás, 1931
- Acanthacorydalis imperatrix Navás, 1917
- Acanthacorydalis orientalis (McLachlan, 1899)
- Acanthacorydalis sinensis Yang & Yang, 1986
- Acanthacorydalis unimaculata Yang & Yang, 1986
- Acanthacorydalis yunnanensis Yang & Yang, 1988

There is a record of an Acanthacorydalis species resembling Acanthacorydalis asiatica from Vietnam that is likely a new species that will be described at some later point.

== Phylogeny ==
This is a phylogeny of the Chinese Acanthacorydalis species, following the most parsimonious tree in Liu et al., 2005.

- Acanthacorydalis
  - Acanthacorydalis orientalis
  - - Acanthacorydalis yunnanensis
    - - Acanthacorydalis unimaculata
      - - Acanthacorydalis fruhstorferi
        - Acanthacorydalis sinensis

Note that A. asiatica, A. horrenda and A. imperatrix are not included.
