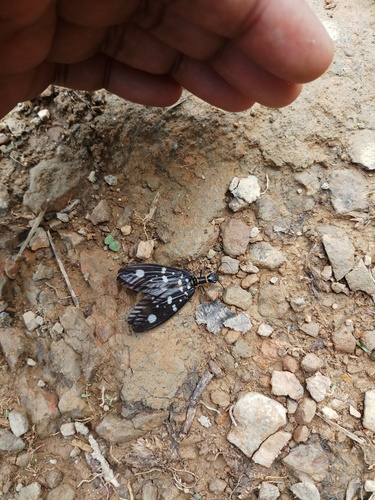
- Adult Neurhermes nigerescens

Scientific classification
- Kingdom: Animalia
- Phylum: Arthropoda
- Class: Insecta
- Order: Megaloptera
- Family: Corydalidae
- Genus: Neurhermes; Navás, 1915

= Neurhermes =

Genus of insects

Neurhermes is a genus of dobsonflies in the family Corydalidae.

== Description ==
Questions about whether Neurhermes and Protohermes are separate genera have been raised repeatedly, with several species being transferred between the two. Neurhermes can be differentiated from Protohermes by presence of protrusions from the sternite plate. Geologic uplift likely resulted in speciation across mainland southeast Asia, followed by dispersal to Sundaland.

Species in Neurhermes and some in Protohermes were originally placed in the deprecated genus Hermes. The color patterns have been described as an example of Batesian mimicry of toxic zygaenid moths. Neurhermes males produce large nuptial gifts of gelatinous spermatophores, but have small mandibles and limited sexual dimorphism compared to many other dobsonflies. Unlike most other dobsonflies, Neurhermes are active during the day, possibly meaning the dark wing color is more related to preventing hybridization with other sympatric genera.

Nanocladius asiaticus have a commensal relationship with many Asian Corydalidae species, and Neurhermes maculipennis serves as the host in the Malay peninsula.

== Taxonomy ==
Neurhermes, when it is recognized as a valid genus, contains the following species, which are otherwise considered to belong to the genus Protohermes:

- Neurhermes costatostriatus (van der Weele, 1907)
- Neurhermes differentialis C.-k. Yang & D. Yang, 1986
- Neurhermes maculiferus (Walker, 1853)
- Neurhermes maculipennis (G. Gray in Cuvier, 1832)
- Neurhermes nigrescens X.-y. Liu et al., 2015
- Neurhermes selysi (van der Weele, 1909)
- Neurhermes sumatrensis (van der Weele, 1909)
- Neurhermes tonkinensis (van der Weele, 1909)
