= Acanthacorydalis unimaculata =

Scientific classification
- Kingdom: Animalia
- Phylum: Arthropoda
- Clade: Pancrustacea
- Class: Insecta
- Order: Megaloptera
- Family: Corydalidae
- Genus: Acanthacorydalis
- Species: A. unimaculata

Binomial name
- Acanthacorydalis unimaculata (Yang & Yang, 1986)

Species of insect

Acanthacorydalis unimaculata is a species of dobsonfly found in China and possibly Vietnam.

== Description ==
Of the chinese species (except A. asiatica), A. unimaculata is keyed out based on the following characters: Body brown to blackish brown with distinct yellow markings on the head and thorax (not concolorous), head with one yellowish spot before ocellar triangle and male mandible without subapical tooth, and only one yellowish spot around ocellar triangle.

== Taxonomy ==
This is a phylogeny of the Chinese Acanthacorydalis species (except A. asiatica), following the most parsimonious tree in Liu et al., 2005.

- Acanthacorydalis
  - Acanthacorydalis orientalis
  - - Acanthacorydalis yunnanensis
    - - Acanthacorydalis unimaculata
      - - Acanthacorydalis fruhstorferi
        - Acanthacorydalis sinensis
