= RKC Waalwijk =

Association football club in the Netherlands

- Full name: Rooms Katholieke Combinatie Waalwijk
- Short name: RKC
- Founded: 26 August 1940; 86 years ago
- Ground: Mandemakers Stadion
- Capacity: 7,508
- Chairman: Peter Konijnenburg
- Head coach: Sander Duits
- League: Eerste Divisie
- 2025–26: Eerste Divisie, 6th of 20
- Website: rkcwaalwijk.nl
Home colours	Away colours

RKC Waalwijk (Dutch pronunciation: [ˌɛrkaːˈseː ˈʋaːlʋɛik]) is a Dutch professional football club based in Waalwijk, North Brabant. The club competes in the Eerste Divisie, the second tier of the Dutch football league system. Its name is an abbreviation of Rooms Katholieke Combinatie ("Roman Catholic Combination"), reflecting its origins as a merger of three local Catholic clubs in 1940.

After decades in amateur football, RKC entered the professional leagues in 1984 and were promoted to the Eredivisie in 1988. The club remained in the top flight for nineteen consecutive seasons, establishing itself as a regular mid-table side and qualifying for European competition on multiple occasions. Since then, RKC have alternated between the Eredivisie and Eerste Divisie, with several promotions and relegations marking the modern era.

RKC play their home matches at the Mandemakers Stadion, their home ground since 1996, and traditionally wear yellow and blue.

== History ==
=== Foundation and amateur era (1940–1984) ===
RKC was founded on 26 August 1940 under the name Rooms Katholieke Combinatie (RKC), following the merger of three Roman Catholic football clubs from Waalwijk: Hercules Excelsior Combinatie (HEC), Waalwijkse Voetbalvereniging Besoijen (WVB), and Waalwijkse Voetbalvereniging Hercules. The merger was encouraged by local Catholic organisers who sought to unite the town's footballing resources into a single, stronger club. A decisive factor came in 1940 when the Roman Catholic Football Federation was absorbed into the Royal Dutch Football Association (KNVB), which would have required the three clubs to compete at a lower level than expected. The prospect accelerated negotiations, and the merger was completed that summer.

The newly formed club began league play in the Derde Klasse and adopted the yellow-and-blue colours that remain associated with RKC. Its home ground was Sportpark Olympia, which served as the club's base for several decades. From its inception, the club functioned as a central sporting institution within Waalwijk's Catholic community and experienced steady organisational growth in the post-war years.

When professional football was introduced in the Netherlands in 1954, RKC remained an amateur club and did not enter the professional league system. Over the following decades, however, the club gradually established itself among the country's strongest amateur sides, progressing through the upper levels of Dutch amateur football and regularly competing in the Hoofdklasse. Contemporary accounts suggest that the club benefited from strong local support and organisational backing during this period, which contributed to its competitive rise.

RKC's amateur era reached its peak in the early 1980s. The club won back-to-back national amateur championships, defeating DOS Kampen in the 1981 final and retaining the title in 1982 with victory over IJsselmeervogels. These successes marked the culmination of more than four decades of development at amateur level and paved the way for the club's transition into professional football in the mid-1980s.

=== Professional football in the Eerste Divisie (1984–1988) ===
As a result of those achievements, RKC entered professional football in the 1984–85 Eerste Divisie. Under chairman Harder, technical board member Kipping, and head coach Leen Looijen, the club assembled a squad combining leading amateur players—including Leon Hutten and Janus van Gelder—with experienced free transfers such as Anton Joore, Leo van Veen, Adrie Bogers, John Lammers, Peter Bosz and Ad van de Wiel. The only transfer fee paid was for Marcel Brands, who arrived from FC Den Bosch.

RKC's first professional match ended in a home draw against Willem II, with Van de Wiel scoring the club's first goal at professional level. In their debut season, RKC finished fifth in the Eerste Divisie, qualifying for the promotion play-offs. The club maintained its upward trajectory in the following two campaigns, finishing third and fourth respectively, again reaching the play-offs.

In the 1987–88 season, with key players including Van de Wiel, Bosz and Brands, RKC won the Eerste Divisie title and secured promotion to the Eredivisie.

=== Two decades in the top tier (1988–2007) ===
RKC were promoted to the Eredivisie in 1988. Shortly afterwards, Marcel Brands, Peter Bosz and head coach Leo van Veen left the club. Ger Blok was appointed as head coach, with André Hoekstra and Herman Teeuwen among the reinforcements, but a difficult first half of the club's debut top-flight season led to Blok's dismissal. Van Veen returned and guided RKC to 11th place in 1988–89, securing survival.

The club improved over the next two seasons. In the 1989–90 season RKC made a strong start and briefly topped the table in the opening weeks before finishing eighth. Around the same period, the club also appeared in the Intertoto Cup in 1989, finishing third in its group, recording two wins against FC Carl Zeiss Jena. Ahead of the 1990–91 season, Marco Boogers was signed and Brands returned to Waalwijk, and RKC finished seventh, which at the time represented the club's highest league position since entering professional football.

In 1991, the club became involved in a fiscal investigation by the Dutch FIOD, which uncovered an illegal payments scheme. Van Veen and board member Piet Kipping were sanctioned for their roles, and the club subsequently reorganised its financial and administrative structure. Despite the disruption, RKC remained competitive on the pitch, finishing tenth in the 1991–92 season; they also returned to the Intertoto Cup in 1992, recording a home victory over Caen.

The consequences of the FIOD investigation affected the playing staff, and the club was granted a licence for the 1992–93 season only after selling a significant portion of the squad. On the field, RKC struggled: under Hans Verèl the team collected six points before the winter break and he was replaced by Bert Jacobs. During the second half of the season, Giovanni van Bronckhorst joined on loan from Feyenoord. RKC avoided automatic relegation and retained their Eredivisie status through the promotion/relegation play-offs.

The mid-to-late 1990s were characterised by repeated relegation battles. The club again required play-offs to remain in the division on several occasions, including the aforementioned 1993–1994 season and in successive seasons between 1997 and 1999. Ahead of the 1995–96 season, "Waalwijk" was added to the club's official name, and the following season, the club moved into its new home ground, the Mandemakers Stadion, a 7,500-seat stadium opened with the season's opening match against Roda JC.

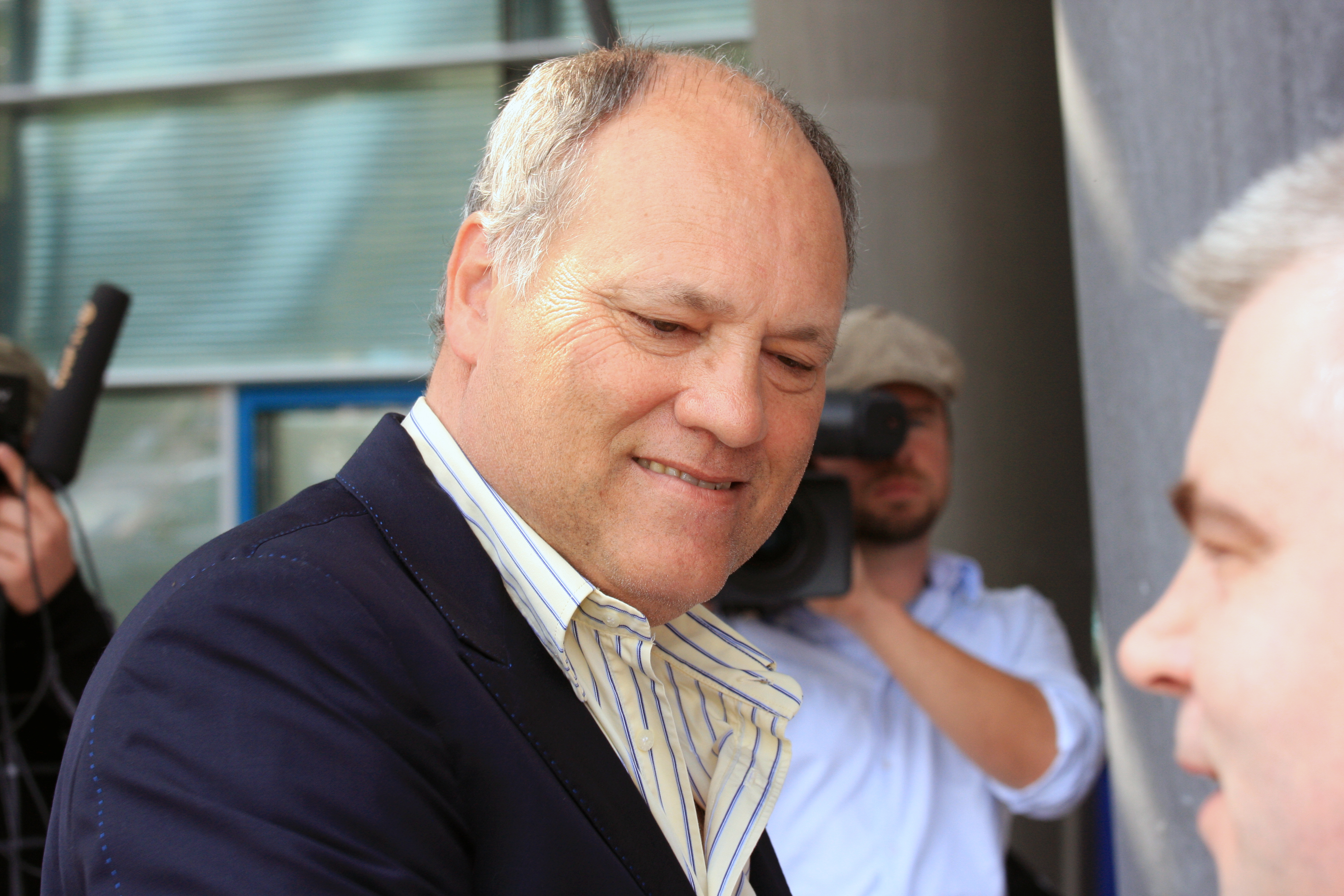
Martin Jol, head coach of RKC Waalwijk from 1998 to 2004, oversaw one of the club's most successful periods, including qualification for European competition.

From the late 1990s onwards, RKC stabilised and increasingly established itself as a mid-table Eredivisie side. Martin Jol was appointed head coach in 1998 and oversaw a sustained period of consolidation. The club finished seventh in the 2000–01 season, matching its earlier best league position and qualifying for the Intertoto Cup. RKC were eliminated in the opening round by 1860 München, having also exited at the same stage the previous year against Bradford City.

After nineteen consecutive seasons in the Eredivisie following promotion, the club's top-flight stay ended in 2006–07. RKC entered the relegation play-offs, defeating Dordrecht in the first round, but were beaten by VVV-Venlo over three matches and relegated to the Eerste Divisie under head coach Mark Wotte.

=== Between divisions (2007–2019) ===
RKC's nineteen-season spell in the Eredivisie ended in 2006–07, when the club lost the promotion/relegation play-off decider 3–0 to VVV-Venlo. In 2007–08, RKC finished second in the Eerste Divisie, missing automatic promotion on goal difference, and subsequently failed to win promotion via the play-offs.

Promotion was achieved a year later. RKC returned to the Eredivisie in June 2009 after winning the promotion/relegation play-offs, defeating De Graafschap 1–0 in the decisive match, with Benjamin De Ceulaer scoring the winner. The return proved short-lived: RKC finished bottom of the 2009–10 Eredivisie and were relegated back to the Eerste Divisie.

In the 2010–11 season, RKC won the Eerste Divisie title and returned to the Eredivisie. The club remained in the top flight for three seasons before being relegated in May 2014, losing the promotion/relegation play-offs over two legs to Excelsior.

The following years were marked by financial pressure and mid-to-lower table finishes in the Eerste Divisie, as the club sought to stabilise and rebuild. In the 2014–15 season, RKC finished bottom of the Eerste Divisie and would ordinarily have been relegated from professional football, but remained in the league after the Topklasse champions declined promotion. The club subsequently spent several seasons in the lower half of the second tier while attempting to stabilise.

Under head coach Fred Grim, appointed in 2018, RKC returned to the Eredivisie in 2019 by winning the promotion/relegation play-offs, culminating in a dramatic final against Go Ahead Eagles in which RKC secured promotion on aggregate.

=== Return to the Eredivisie (2019–present) ===
RKC returned to the Eredivisie in 2019 after a five-year absence by defeating Go Ahead Eagles in the promotion and relegation play-off final. After a 0–0 draw in the first leg at home, the club won the return match 5–4 away to secure promotion.

In the 2019–20 season, RKC finished last, but avoided relegation after the season was declared void because of the COVID-19 pandemic. The club then preserved its top-flight status on sporting merit by finishing 15th in 2020–21.

RKC were relegated from the Eredivisie at the end of the 2024–25 season, finishing 17th. The club endured a historically poor start, equalling the league record for most consecutive defeats to start a season, and struggled with discipline, receiving six red cards in the first twelve matches. Head coach Henk Fraser remained in charge throughout, despite mounting criticism. In October, the club attracted national attention by signing former prodigy Mohamed Ihattaren, whose arrival briefly lifted morale and media focus. A short resurgence in early 2025, including a 5–0 win over NAC Breda, proved insufficient, and relegation to the Eerste Divisie was confirmed on the final matchday.

== Results ==
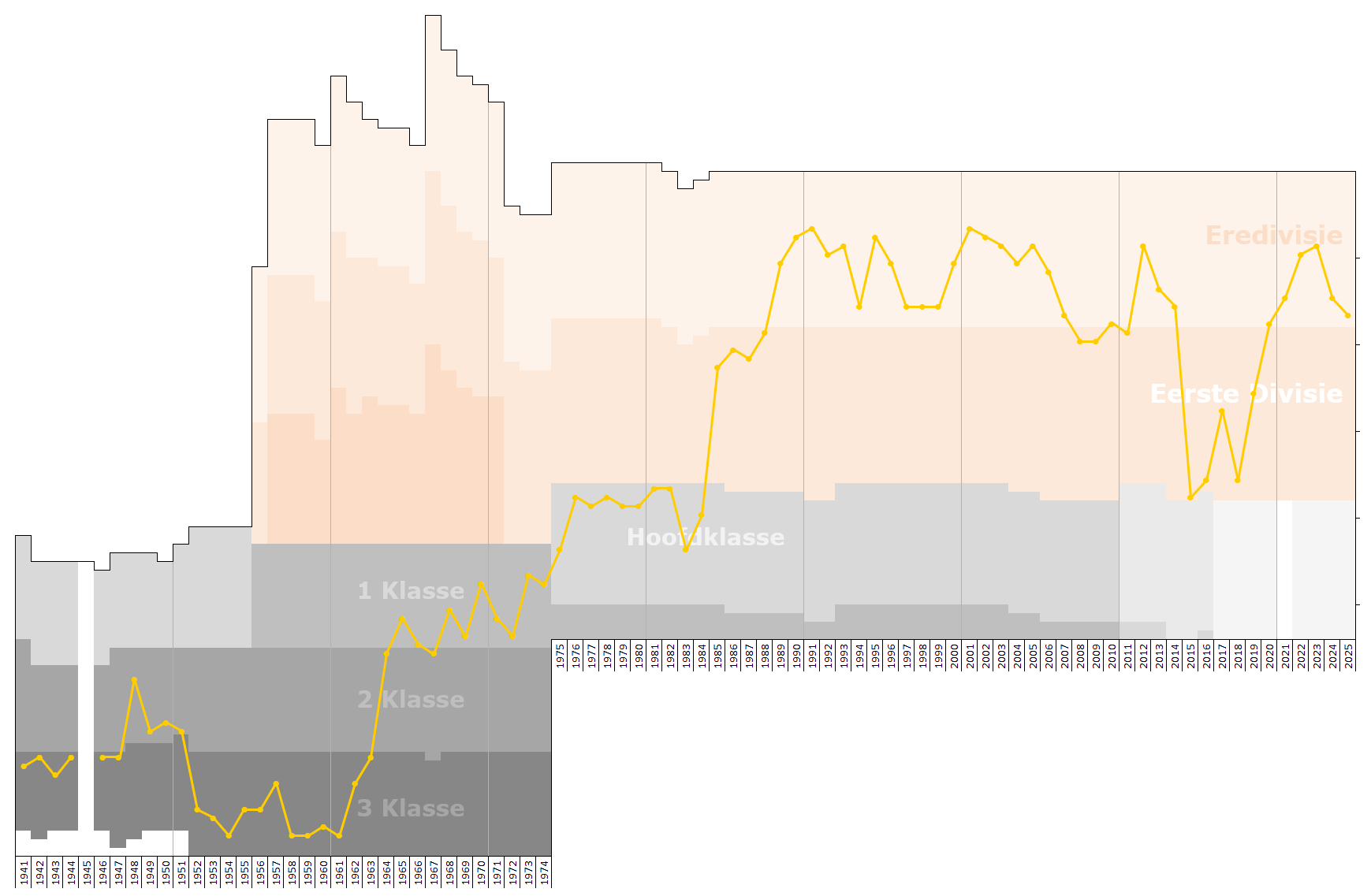
Historical chart of league performance

Below is a table with RKC's domestic results since the introduction of professional football in 1984.

Domestic Results since 1956
Domestic league	League result	Qualification to	KNVB Cup season	Cup result
2025–26 Eerste Divisie	6th	promotion/relegation play-offs: no promotion	2025–26	round of 16
2024–25 Eredivisie	17th	Eerste Divisie (relegation)	2024–25	round of 16
2023–24 Eredivisie	15th	–	2023–24	first round
2022–23 Eredivisie	9th	–	2022–23	first round
2021–22 Eredivisie	10th	–	2021–22	quarter finals
2020–21 Eredivisie	15th	–	2020–21	first round
2019–20 Eredivisie	18th	No relegation due to COVID-19	2019–20	first round
2018–19 Eerste Divisie	8th	Eredivisie (winning promotion/releg. play-offs)	2018–19	round of 16
2017–18 Eerste Divisie	18th	–	2017–18	second round
2016–17 Eerste Divisie	10th	–	2016–17	second round
2015–16 Eerste Divisie	18th	–	2015–16	second round
2014–15 Eerste Divisie	20th	–	2014–15	second round
2013–14 Eredivisie	16th	Eerste Divisie (promotion/relegation playoffs: relegation)	2013–14	second round
2012–13 Eredivisie	14th	–	2012–13	third round
2011–12 Eredivisie	9h	–	2011–12	quarter final
2010–11 Eerste Divisie	1st	Eredivisie (promoted)	2010–11	semi final
2009–10 Eredivisie	18th	Eerste Divisie (relegation)	2009–10	second round
2008–09 Eerste Divisie	2nd	Eredivisie (promotion/relegation play-offs: promotion)	2008–09	third round
2007–08 Eerste Divisie	2nd	promotion/relegation play-offs: no promotion	2007–08	round of 16
2006–07 Eredivisie	17th	Eerste Divisie (promotion/relegation play-off: relegation)	2006–07	semi final
2005–06 Eredivisie	12th	–	2005–06	third round
2004–05 Eredivisie	9th	–	2004–05	round of 16
2003–04 Eredivisie	11th	–	2003–04	round of 16
2002–03 Eredivisie	9th	–	2002–03	third round
2001–02 Eredivisie	8th	–	2001–02	round of 16
2000–01 Eredivisie	7th	–	2000–01	second round
1999–2000 Eredivisie	11th	–	1999–00	quarter finals
1998–99 Eredivisie	16th	promotion/relegation competition: no relegation	1998–99	second round
1997–98 Eredivisie	16th	promotion/relegation competition: no relegation	1997–98	second round
1996–97 Eredivisie	16th	promotion/relegation competition: no relegation	1996–97	round of 16
1995–96 Eredivisie	11th	–	1995–96	second round
1994–95 Eredivisie	8th	–	1994–95	second round
1993–94 Eredivisie	16th	promotion/relegation competition: no relegation	1993–94	quarter finals
1992–93 Eredivisie	9th	–	1992–93	round of 16
1991–92 Eredivisie	10th	–	1991–92	third round
1990–91 Eredivisie	7th	–	1990–91	second round
1989–90 Eredivisie	8th	–	1989–90	second round
1988–89 Eredivisie	11th	–	1988–89	second round
1987–88 Eerste Divisie	1st	Eredivisie (promotion)	1987–88	semi finals
1986–87 Eerste Divisie	4th	promotion competition: no promotion	1986–87	second round
1985–86 Eerste Divisie	3rd	promotion competition: no promotion	1985–86	first round
1984–85 Eerste Divisie	5th	promotion competition: no promotion	1984–85	first round

== European record ==
Season	Competition	Round	Opposition	Home (Note: RKC score listed first)	Away	Aggregate
1989	Intertoto Cup	Group stage	(West Germany) 1. FC Kaiserslautern	1–1	2–2	3rd
1989	Intertoto Cup	Group stage	(Austria) First Vienna FC	3–4	2–4	3rd
1989	Intertoto Cup	Group stage	(East Germany) Carl Zeiss Jena	2–0	1–0	3rd
1992	Intertoto Cup	Group stage	(France) Caen	1–0	0–2	4th
1992	Intertoto Cup	Group stage	(Denmark) Lyngby	1–1	0–2	4th
1992	Intertoto Cup	Group stage	(Germany) Schalke 04	2–3	2–4	4th
2000	Intertoto Cup	Third round	(England) Bradford City	0–2	0–1	0–3
2001	Intertoto Cup	Third round	(Germany) TSV 1860 München	1–2	1–3	2–5

== Current squad ==
As of 25 September 2026

Note: Flags indicate national team as defined under FIFA eligibility rules; some limited exceptions apply. Players may hold more than one non-FIFA nationality.

No.	Pos.	Nation	Player
1	GK	NED	Niek Schiks (on loan from PSV Eindhoven)
2	DF	NED	Bjarn Zorgdrager
3	DF	NED	Sven van der Plas
4	DF	SUR	Liam van Gelderen
5	DF	DOM	Juan Castillo
6	DF	NED	Loek Postma
7	MF	FRA	Ryan Fage
8	MF	NED	Jochem Nap
9	FW	NED	Jesse van de Haar
10	MF	NED	Thijs van Leeuwen
11	FW	NED	Yoram van der Veen
13	GK	NED	Xander Mulder
16	GK	NED	Mark Spenkelink
17	FW	NED	Roy Kuijpers

No.	Pos.	Nation	Player
18	MF	NED	Rein van Hedel
19	FW	NED	Haye van Gemert
20	FW	POR	Keyan Varela (on loan from Servette)
22	MF	NED	Tim van de Loo
24	FW	NED	Azzedine Dkidak
25	DF	SUR	Navajo Bakboord
27	FW	NED	Finn Stokkers
30	DF	NED	Jordy de Wijs
31	GK	NED	Luuk Vogels
33	DF	MAR	Faissal Al Mazyani
42	DF	NED	Bart Kemmeren
55	DF	CUW	Nazjir Held
93	FW	SUR	Virgil Misidjan

== Honours ==
- Eerste Divisie
  - Champions (2): 1987–88, 2010–11

== Club officials ==
Position	Staff
Head Coach	(Netherlands) Sander Duits
Assistant Coach	(Netherlands) Jordi Roelofsen
First-Team Coach	(Netherlands) Peter Uneken
Goalkeeper Coach	(Netherlands) Rein Baart
Assistant Goalkeeper Coach	(Netherlands) Bart Tinus
Video Analyst	(Netherlands) Jasper Vernooij
Sports Scientist / Data Analyst	(Netherlands) Folkert Boer
Chief Scout	(Netherlands) Lars Lambooij
Scout	(Netherlands) Cees Schapendonk
Club doctor	(Netherlands) Tim Baijens
Physiotherapist	(Netherlands) Robert van Riel (Netherlands) Rob Westerlaken
Sports Carer	(Netherlands) Ramon van Haaren
Exercise Physiologist	(Netherlands) Nick van Aken
Kit Manager	(Netherlands) Djordy de Nijs
Team Manager	(Netherlands) Sander van den Anker
Technical Director	(Netherlands) Mohammed Allach

== Former coaches ==
From	To	Manager
1968	1971	Wim Klaassen
1974	1980	Jan Remmers
1980	1982	Jos Wap
1983	1983	Kees Vermunt
1983	1984	Rien de Leur
1985	1986	Leen Looijen
1986	1993	Leo van Veen
1993	1993	Hans Verèl
1993	1995	Bert Jacobs
1995	1996	Leo van Veen
1996	1996	Cees van Kooten
1996	1997	Bert Jacobs
1997	1998	Peter Boeve
1998	2004	Martin Jol

From	To	Manager
2004	2005	Erwin Koeman
2005	2006	Adrie Koster
2006	2007	Mark Wotte
2007	2008	Željko Petrović
2008	2012	Ruud Brood
2012	2014	Erwin Koeman
2014	2015	Martin Koopman
2015	2018	Peter van den Berg
2018	2018	Hans de Koning
2018	2021	Fred Grim
2021	2023	Joseph Oosting
2023	2025	Henk Fraser
2025	Present	Sander Duits

== See also ==
- Dutch football league teams
