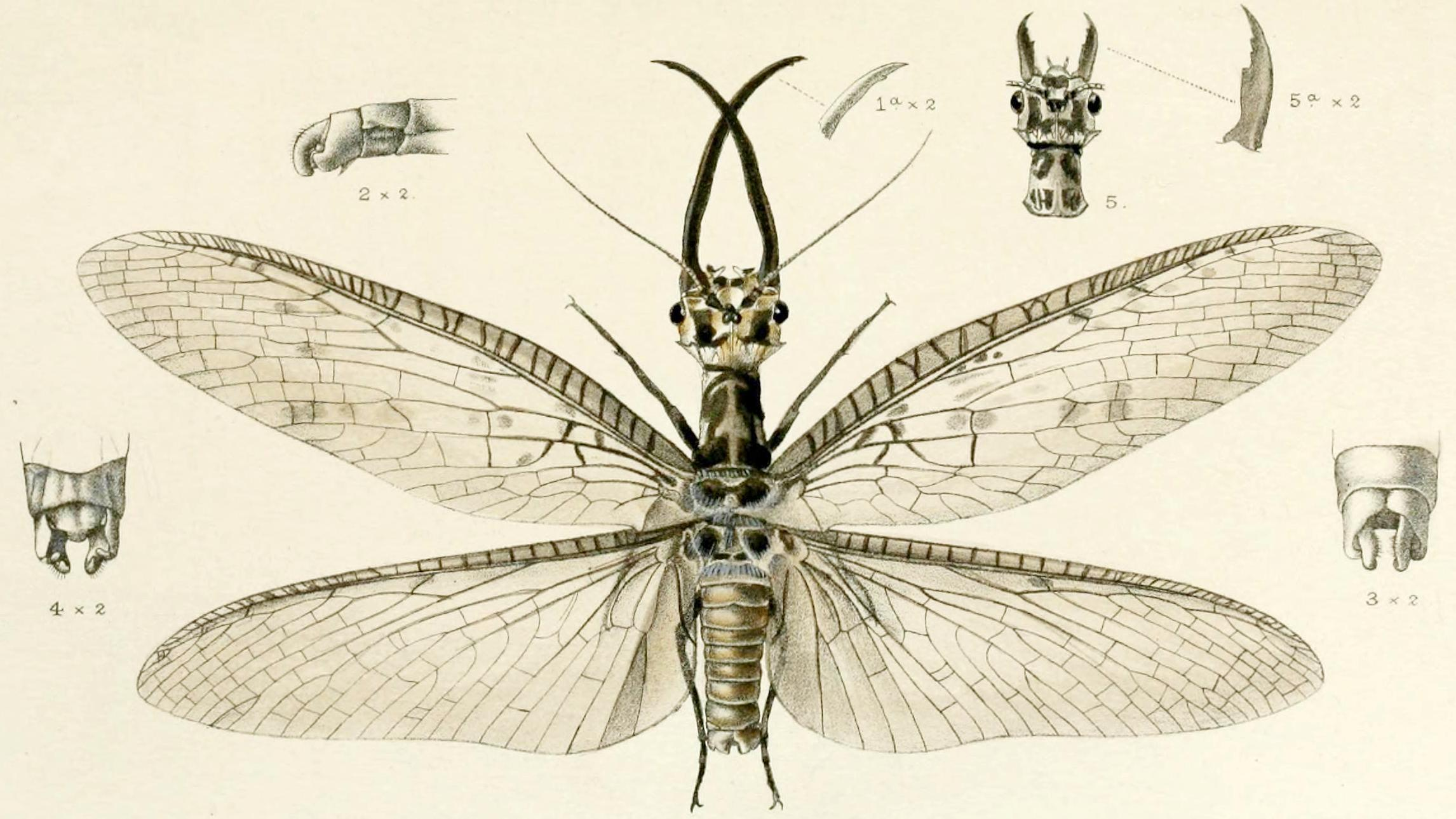
- The male body, external genitalia and female head.

Scientific classification
- Kingdom: Animalia
- Phylum: Arthropoda
- Clade: Pancrustacea
- Class: Insecta
- Order: Megaloptera
- Family: Corydalidae
- Genus: Acanthacorydalis
- Species: A. asiatica

Binomial name
- Acanthacorydalis asiatica (Wood-Mason, 1884)

= Acanthacorydalis asiatica =

Species of insect

Acanthacorydalis asiatica is an Oriental species of dobsonfly. More specifically, it has been found in China, India, Myanmar, Thailand and possibly Vietnam.

== Morphology ==
This species is diagnosed on the distinctive black markings on the otherwise yellow head and the four black blotches at each corner of the pronotum that form a yellow arrow-like spot in the middle. The body length of the female is 48–58 mm (1.9–2.2 in). They show significant sexual dimorphism in the length of the mandibles, as those of the male grow conspicuously long compared to the female.

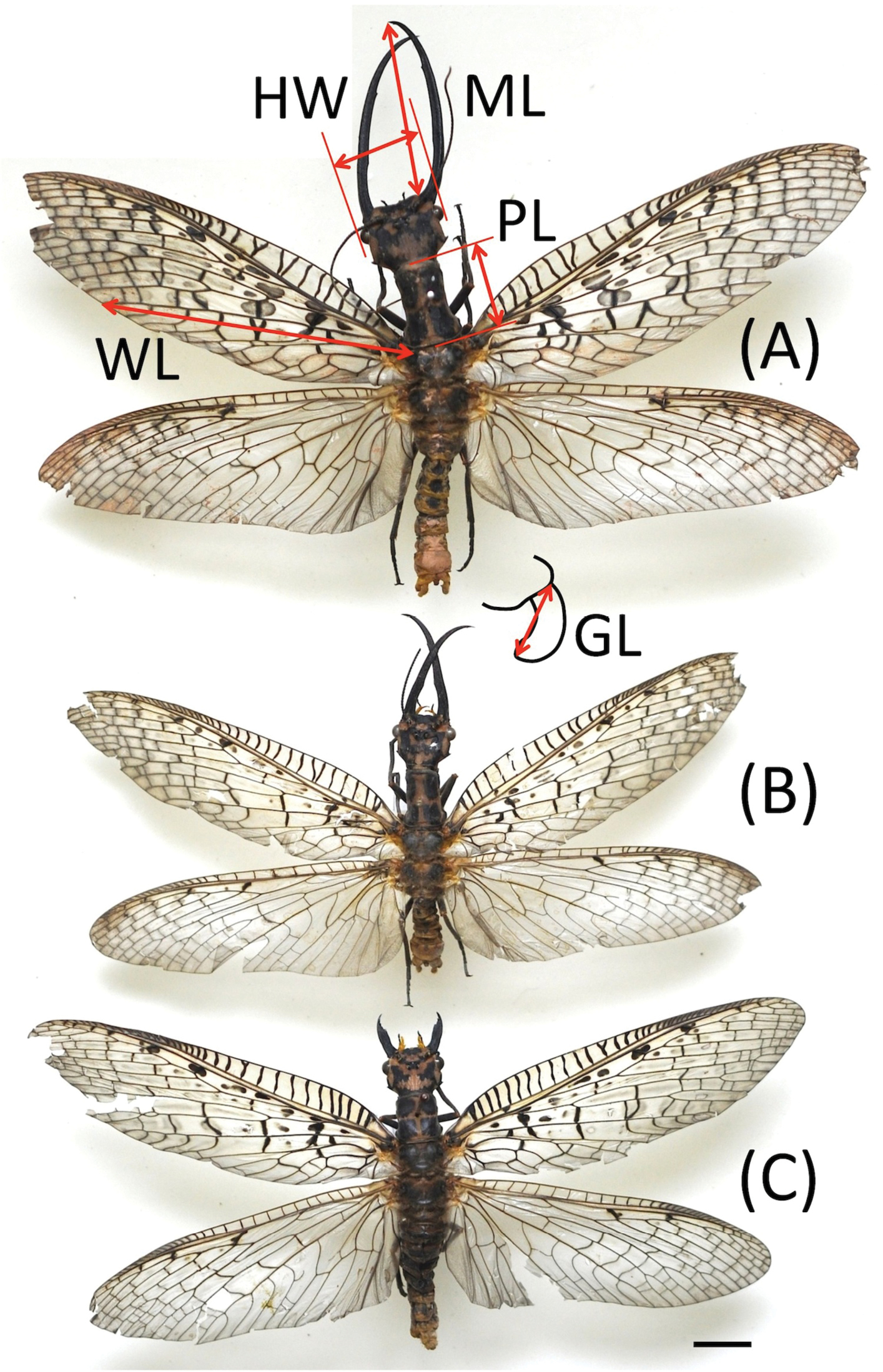
Large male (A), small male (B), and female (C)

== Defense ==
The larvae of Acanthacorydalis asiatica will curl up, attack and swing around when threatened. They will also spit out regurgitant and intestinal contents through the mouth opening. In the late instar, this mechanism can be activated with a gentle touch. The fluid is yellow-brown and fowl-smelling. Touching of the abdomen has been found to be the fastest trigger of this. That is likely because it is the softest and most vulnurable part of the body.

Adult males use their long mandibles for fighting other males to gain access to females or tree sap, which attracts females.
