= Herman Johannes van der Weele =

Dutch painter (1852–1930)

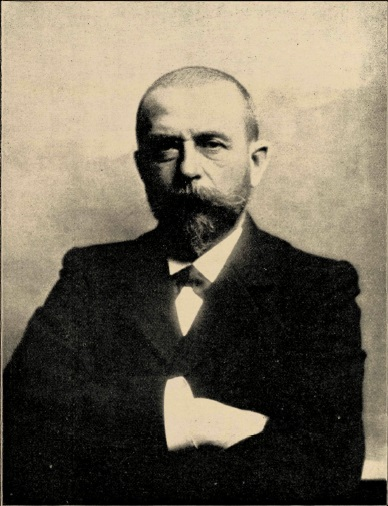
Herman Johannes van der Weele (c. 1900)

Herman Johannes van der Weele (13 January 1852 in Middelburg – 2 December 1930 in The Hague) was a Dutch painter of the second generation of the Hague School. He is the father of Dutch entomologist Herman Willem van der Weele (1879–1910).

== Biography ==
Van der Weele lived and worked initially in Middelburg, where he was a special inspector of the sea and harbor works in Zeeland. When he was 20 he moved to The Hague and was a student of the Art Academy in The Hague. He received advice from Anton Mauve and Johannes Bosboom.

Mauve's influence can be detected in van der Weele's paintings. His compositions have the same simplicity and his choices of subjects are very much like those of Mauve. He painted flocks of sheep, sheep barns, stable interiors, meadows with cows, sand drifts, foresters with horses, farmers plowing with an ox team, milkmaids tending cows, street scenes with coaches, and sand quarries. Van der Weele occasionally worked in Limburg and Drente, but he usually spent his summers around Nunspeet in the Veluwe. Van der Weele was a close friend of George Hendrik Breitner, who dedicated his 'Self-portrait With Lorgnette' to van der Weele.

== Selected works ==
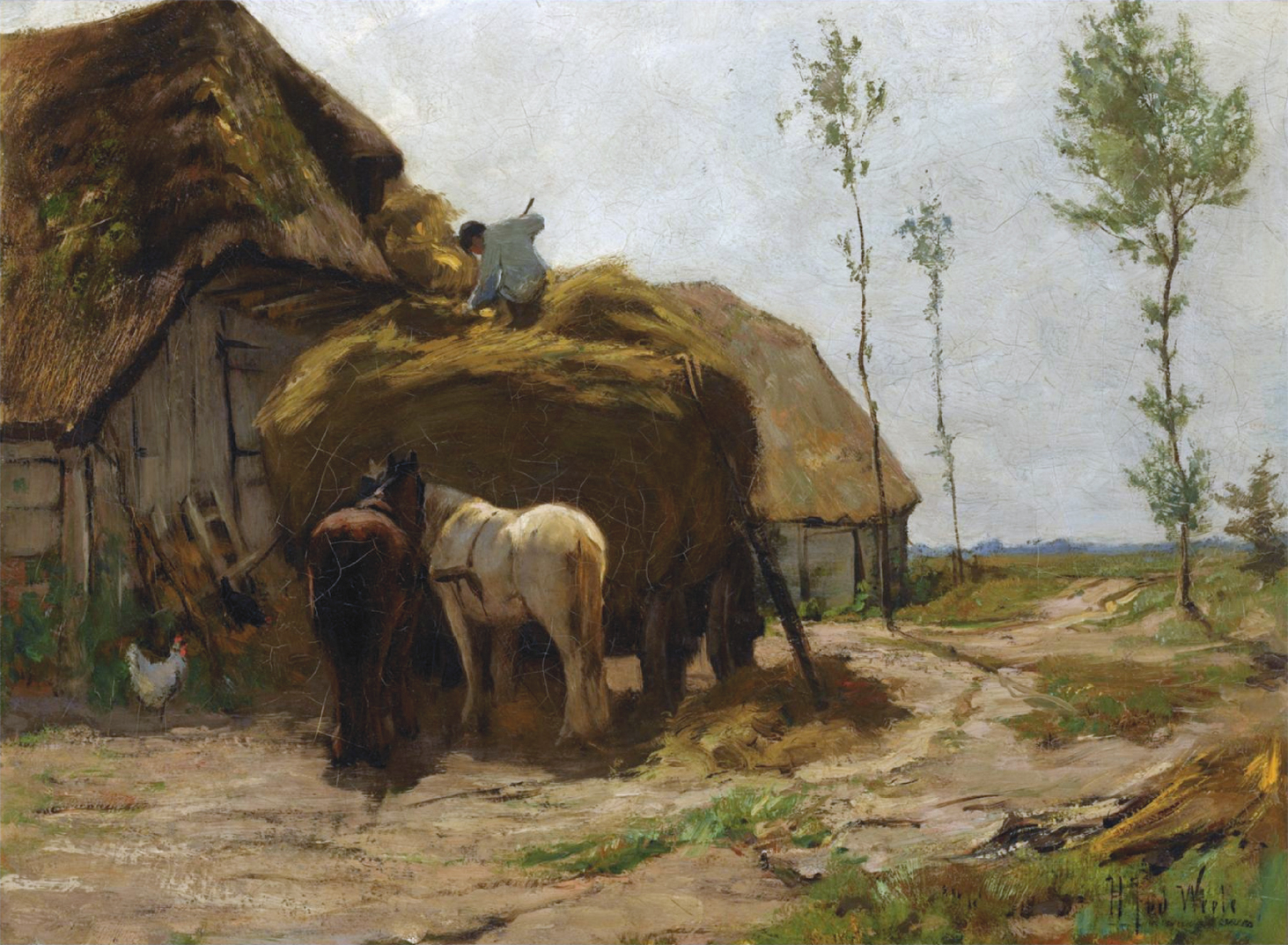
The Provisioning
of the Hayloft

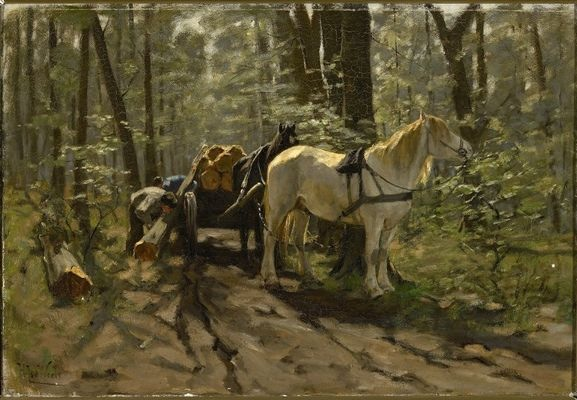
In the Birch Forest

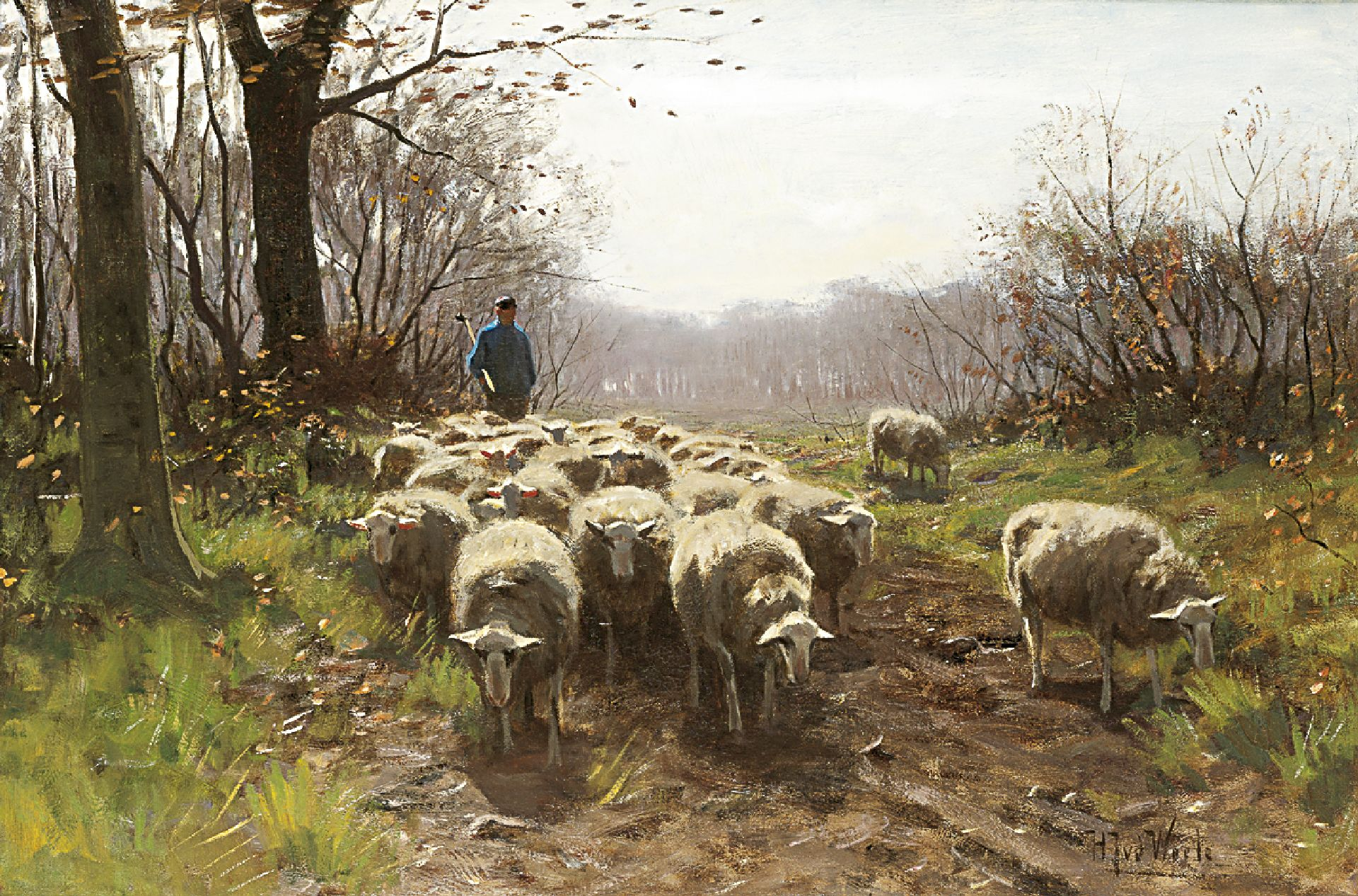
Sheep Herder

== Sources ==
- Sillevis, John and Tabak, Anne, The Hague School Book, Waanders Uitgegevers, Zwolle, 2004, pp. 349–355
