= Leo van Veen =

Dutch football player and manager (1946–2026)

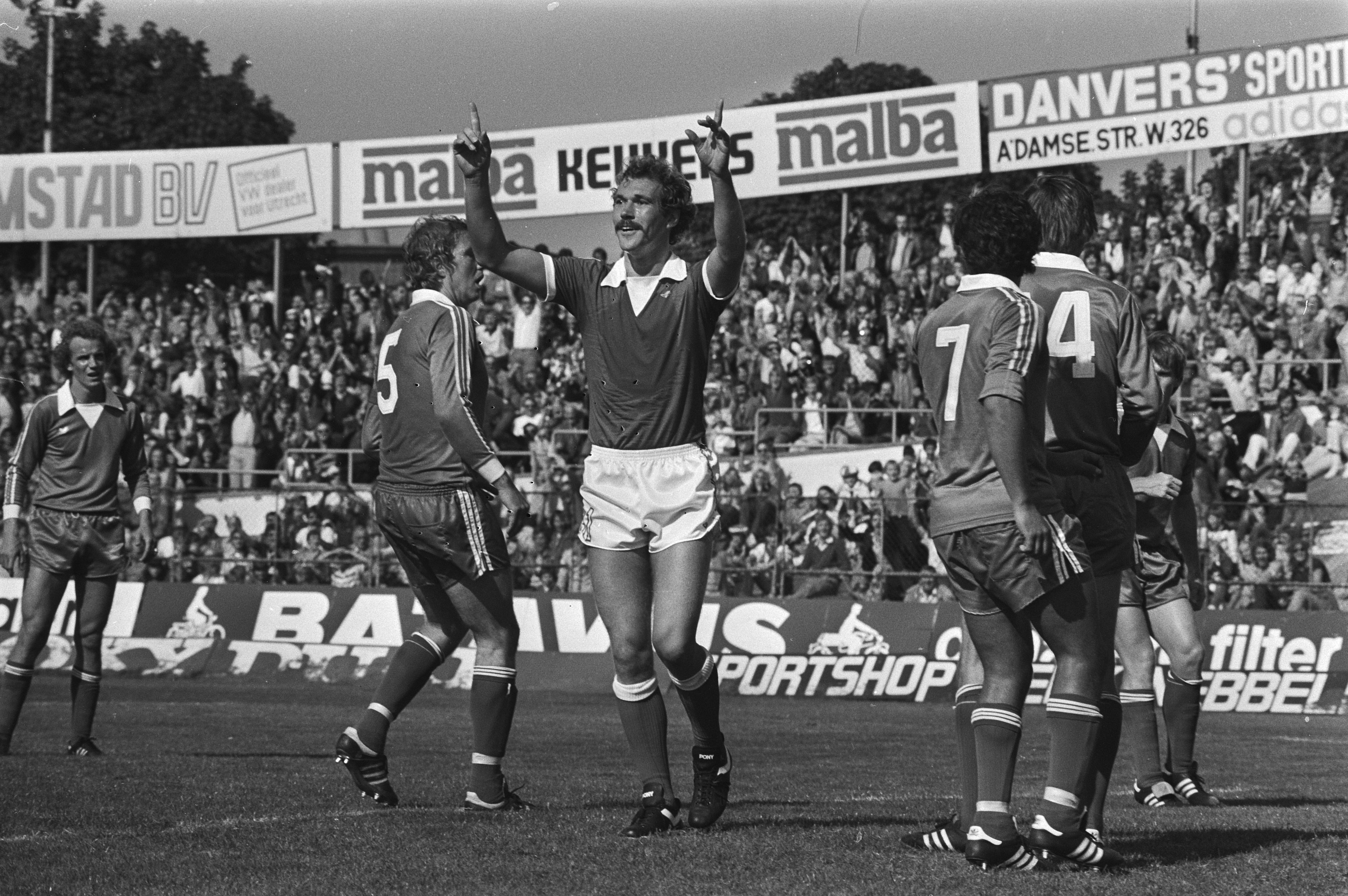
- Van Veen in 1979

Personal information
- Date of birth: 6 June 1946
- Place of birth: Utrecht, Netherlands
- Date of death: 8 July 2026 (aged 80)
- Place of death: Woerden, Netherlands
- Positions: Forward; defender

Senior career*
Years	Team	Apps	(Gls)
1962–1970	DOS		
1970–1982	FC Utrecht		
1979–1980	Los Angeles Aztecs	51	(21)
1982–1983	Ajax	23	(0)
1983–1984	FC Utrecht		
1984–1986	RKC Waalwijk		

Managerial career
- 1986–1988: RKC Waalwijk
- 1988–1989: VVV-Venlo
- 1989–1993: RKC Waalwijk
- 1993–1995: FC Utrecht
- 1995–1996: RKC Waalwijk
- 1996–1997: Go Ahead Eagles
- 1999–2000: Ajax Cape Town
- * Club domestic league appearances and goals

Leo van Veen (Dutch pronunciation: [ˈleːjoː vɑɱ ˈveːn]; 6 June 1946 – 8 July 2026) was a Dutch footballer who played as a forward or defender. During his career he played for FC Utrecht, Los Angeles Aztecs, Ajax Amsterdam and RKC Waalwijk, making 555 appearances in the Eredivisie and scoring 174 goals. Later on he became a football manager.

Van Veen died of complications from Alzheimer's disease on 8 July 2026, at the age of 80.
