= Ad van de Wiel =

Dutch footballer

Personal information
- Date of birth: 1 August 1959 (age 67)
- Place of birth: Den Bosch, Netherlands

Senior career*
Years	Team	Apps	(Gls)
- Willem II
- Turnhout
- RKC Waalwijk
1990	Den Bosch	15	(5)
1991	FC Volendam	8	(2)
- * Club domestic league appearances and goals

Ad van de Wiel (born 1 August 1959) is a Dutch former professional footballer who played as a forward for Willem II, Belgian club KFC Turnhout, RKC, Den Bosch and FC Volendam. He was the top scorer in the 1987–88 Eerste Divisie season, with 34 goals. Outside of football, van de Wiel was known for his love of gambling and women, and he received a three-month prison sentence after stabbing a love rival. A biography about him was published in 2015.
