= Acanthacorydalis sinensis =

Scientific classification
- Kingdom: Animalia
- Phylum: Arthropoda
- Clade: Pancrustacea
- Class: Insecta
- Order: Megaloptera
- Family: Corydalidae
- Genus: Acanthacorydalis
- Species: A. sinensis

Binomial name
- Acanthacorydalis sinensis (Yang & Yang, 1986)

Species of insect

Acanthacorydalis sinensis is a species of dobsonfly endemic to China.

== Diagnosis ==
Of the Chinese species (except A. asiatica), A. sinensis is keyed out based on the following characters: Body blackish brown, head and prothorax concolorous and prothorax 1.4 times (male) and 1.1 times (female) longer than wide at midlength. The male ninth tergum undivided with an arcuate incision at the base.

== Taxonomy ==
This is a phylogeny of the Chinese Acanthacorydalis species (except A. asiatica), following the most parsimonious tree in Liu et al., 2005.

- Acanthacorydalis
  - Acanthacorydalis orientalis
  - - Acanthacorydalis yunnanensis
    - - Acanthacorydalis unimaculata
      - - Acanthacorydalis fruhstorferi
        - Acanthacorydais sinensis
