= Herman Willem van der Weele =

Dutch entomologist

- Born: Herman Willem van der Weele; 8 October 1879
- Died: 29 August 1910 (aged 30)

Herman Willem van der Weele (8 October 1879 – 29 August 1910) was a Dutch entomologist. He was the son of Dutch painter Herman Johannes van der Weele (1852–1930).

== Works ==
- Ascalaphiden: monographisch. HW van der Weele, ME baron de Sélys-Longchamps – 1908
- New genera and species of Megaloptera Latr. HW Van der Weele – Notes from the Leyden Museum, 1909
- Mecoptera and Planipennia of insulinde. HW Van der Weele, E Jacobson – Notes from the Leyden Museum, 1909
- Megaloptera (Latreille): monographic revision. HW van der Weele – 1910
