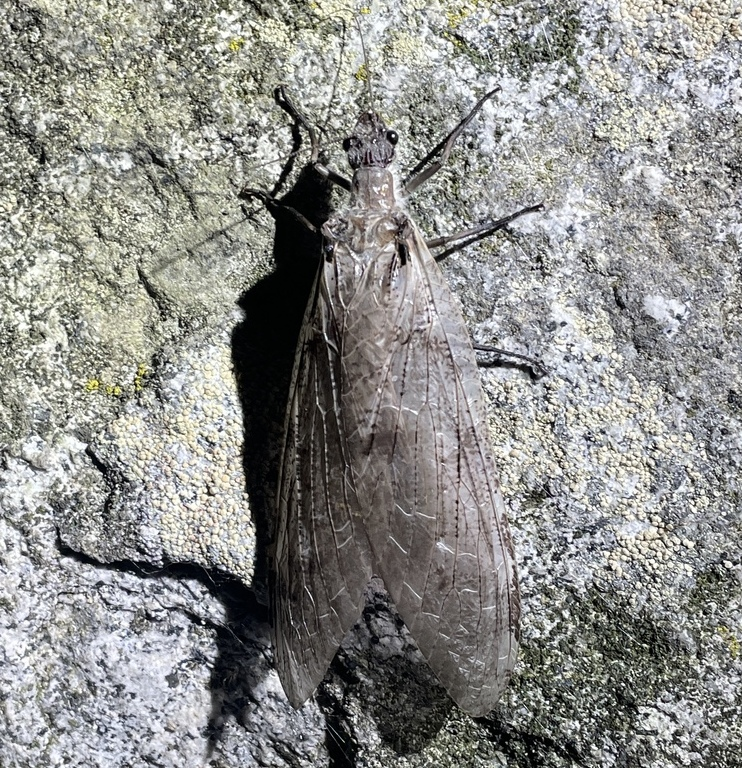
- At Sequoia National Park (CA)

Scientific classification
- Kingdom: Animalia
- Phylum: Arthropoda
- Class: Insecta
- Order: Megaloptera
- Family: Corydalidae
- Genus: Dysmicohermes
- Species: D. ingens

Binomial name
- Dysmicohermes ingens Chandler, 1954

= Dysmicohermes ingens =

Species of insect

Dysmicohermes ingens is a species of fishfly in the family Corydalidae. It is found in North America.
