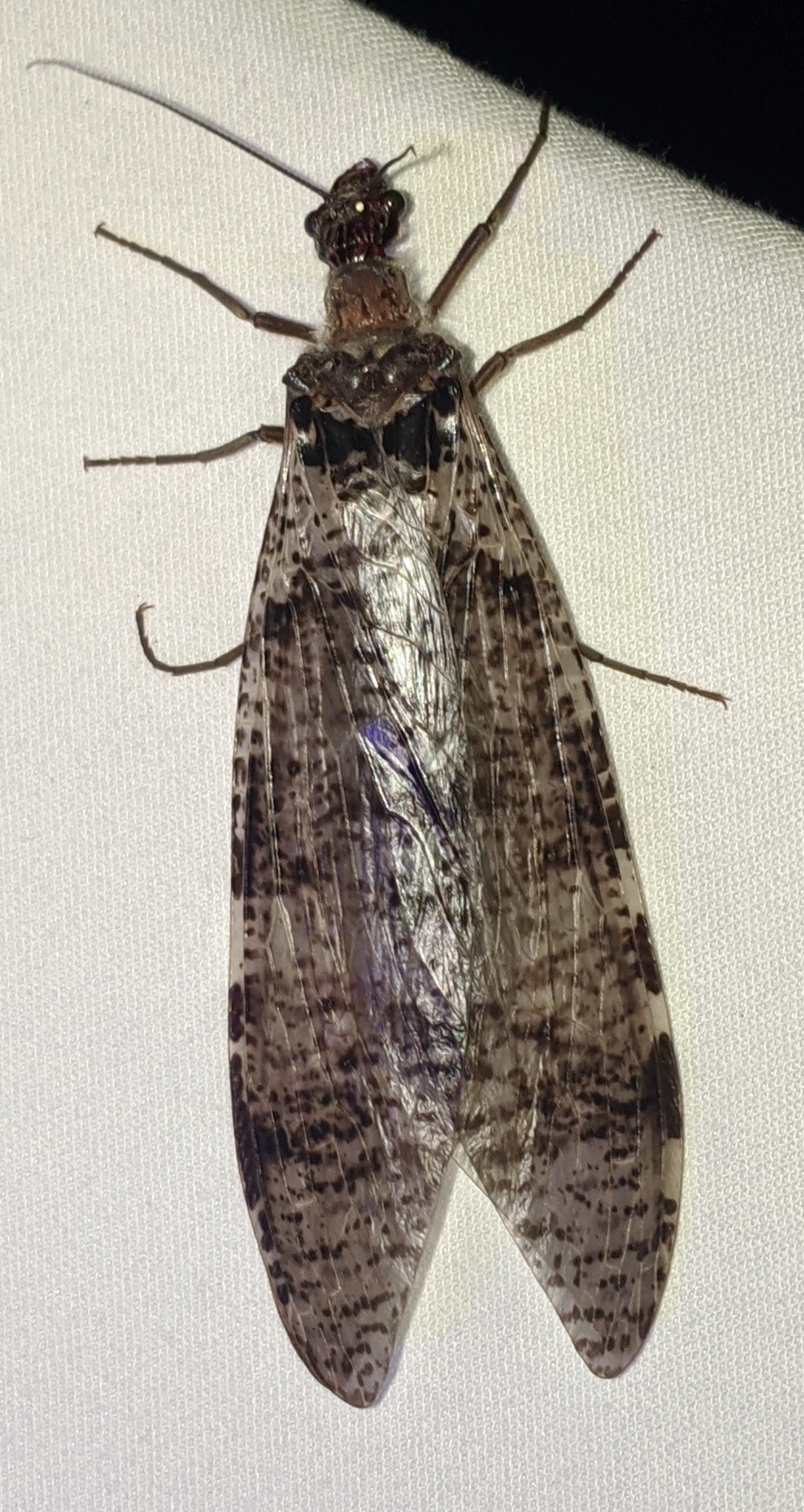
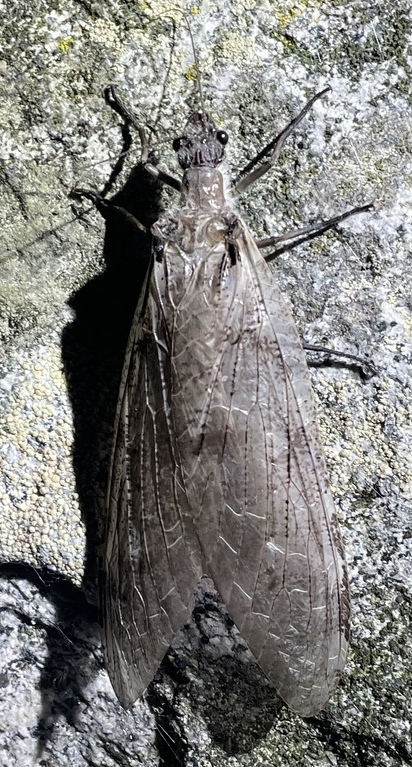
- D. disjuctus (left), D. ingens (right)

Scientific classification
- Kingdom: Animalia
- Phylum: Arthropoda
- Class: Insecta
- Order: Megaloptera
- Family: Corydalidae
- Subfamily: Chauliodinae
- Genus: Dysmicohermes; Munroe, 1953

= Dysmicohermes =

Genus of insects

Dysmicohermes is a genus of fishflies in the family Corydalidae. There are at least two described species in Dysmicohermes.

== Species ==
These two species belong to the genus Dysmicohermes:

- Dysmicohermes disjunctus (Walker, 1866)
- Dysmicohermes ingens Chandler, 1954
