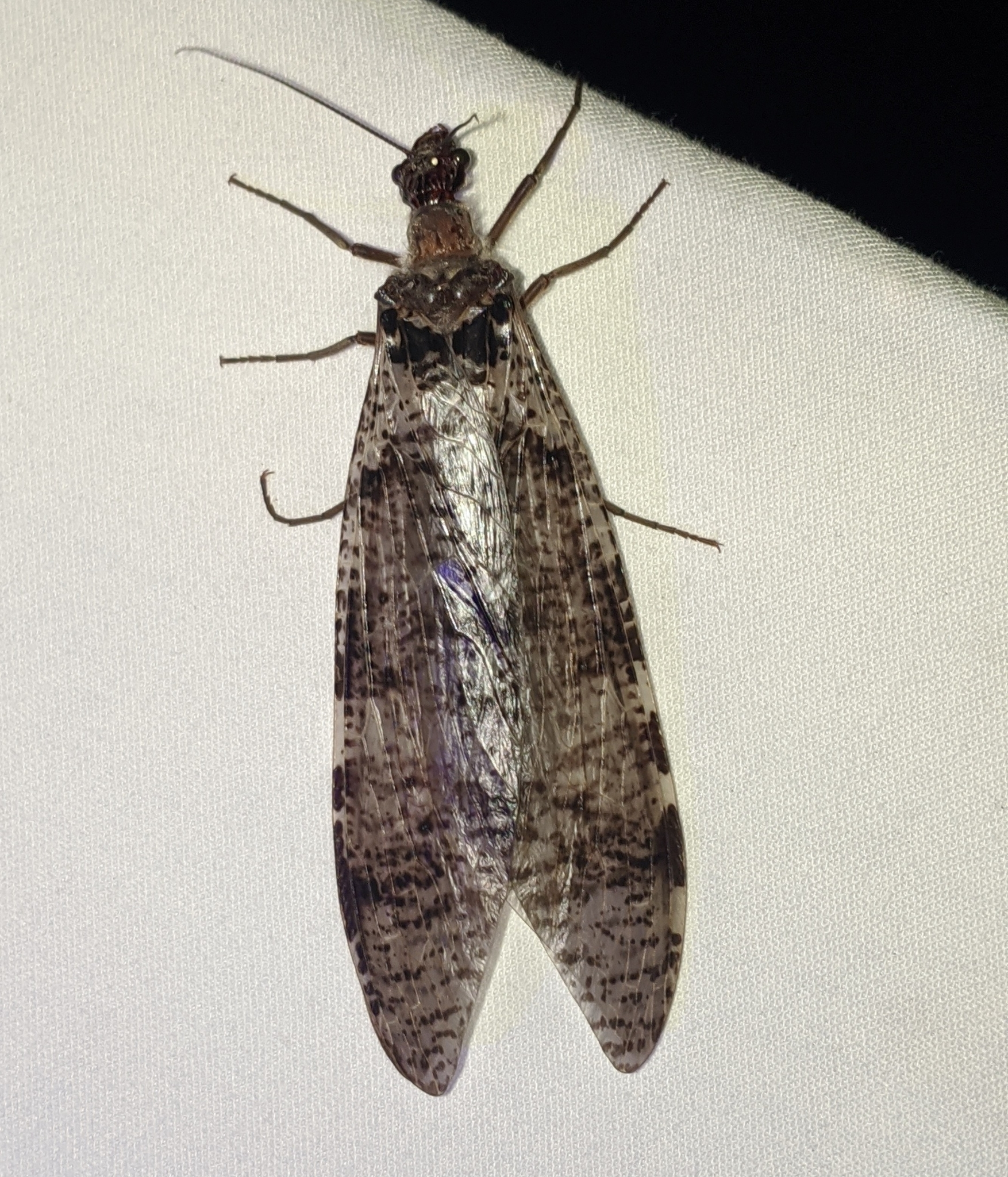
- In British Columbia

Scientific classification
- Kingdom: Animalia
- Phylum: Arthropoda
- Class: Insecta
- Order: Megaloptera
- Family: Corydalidae
- Genus: Dysmicohermes
- Species: D. disjunctus

Binomial name
- Dysmicohermes disjunctus (Walker, 1866)

= Dysmicohermes disjunctus =

Species of insect

Dysmicohermes disjunctus is a species of fishfly in the family Corydalidae. It is found in North America.

== Gallery ==
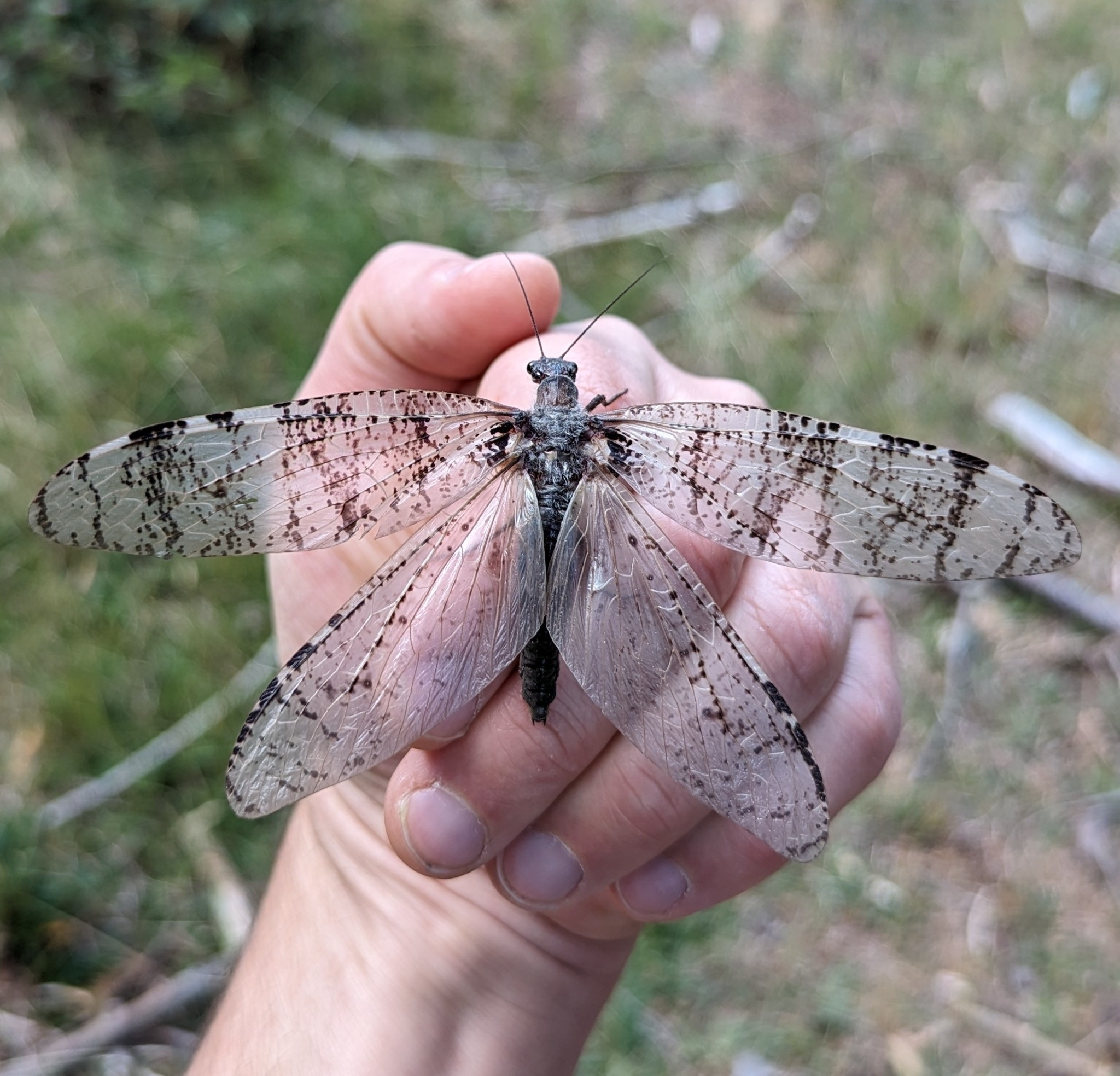
Showing wingspan

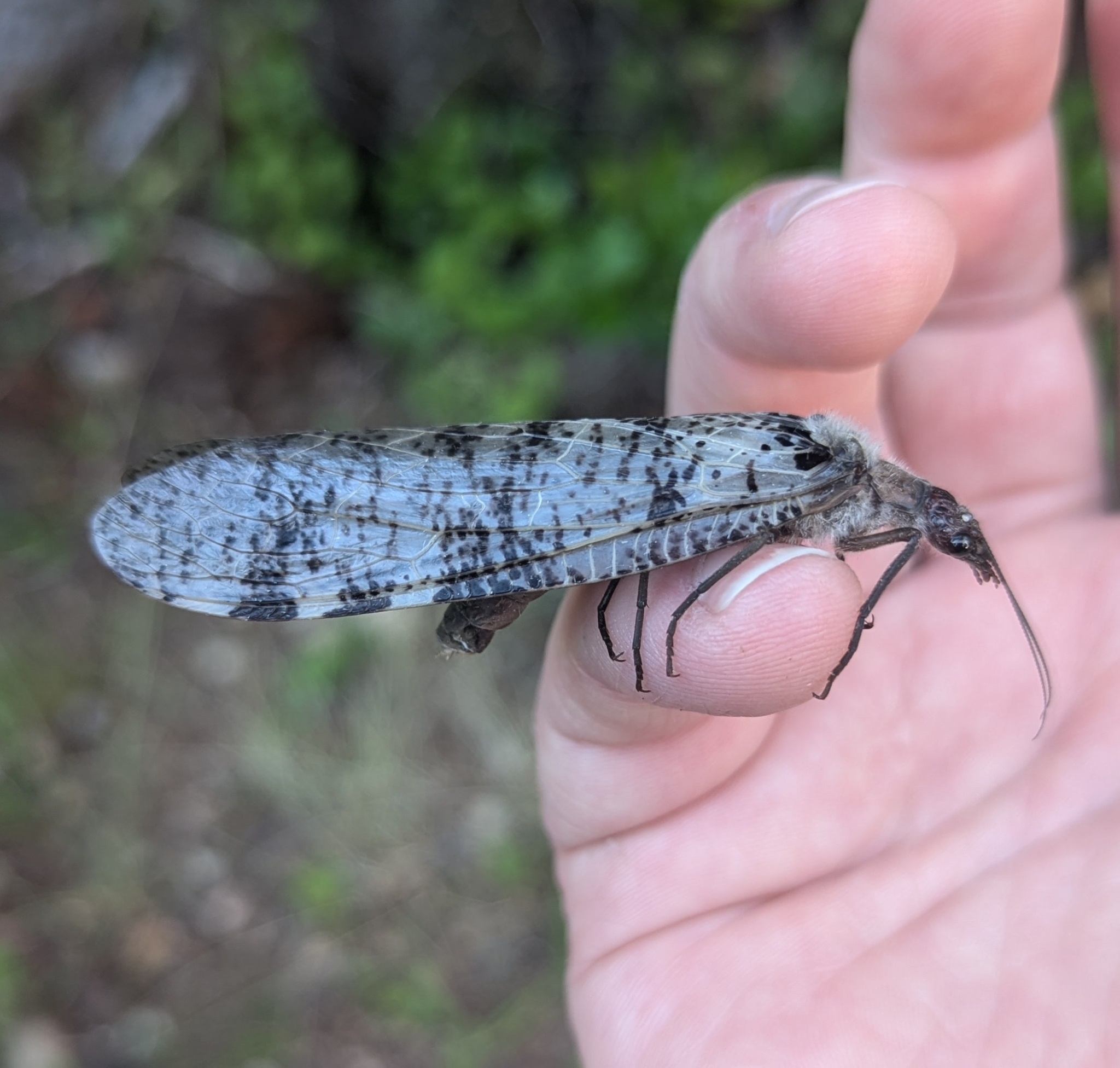
Side view

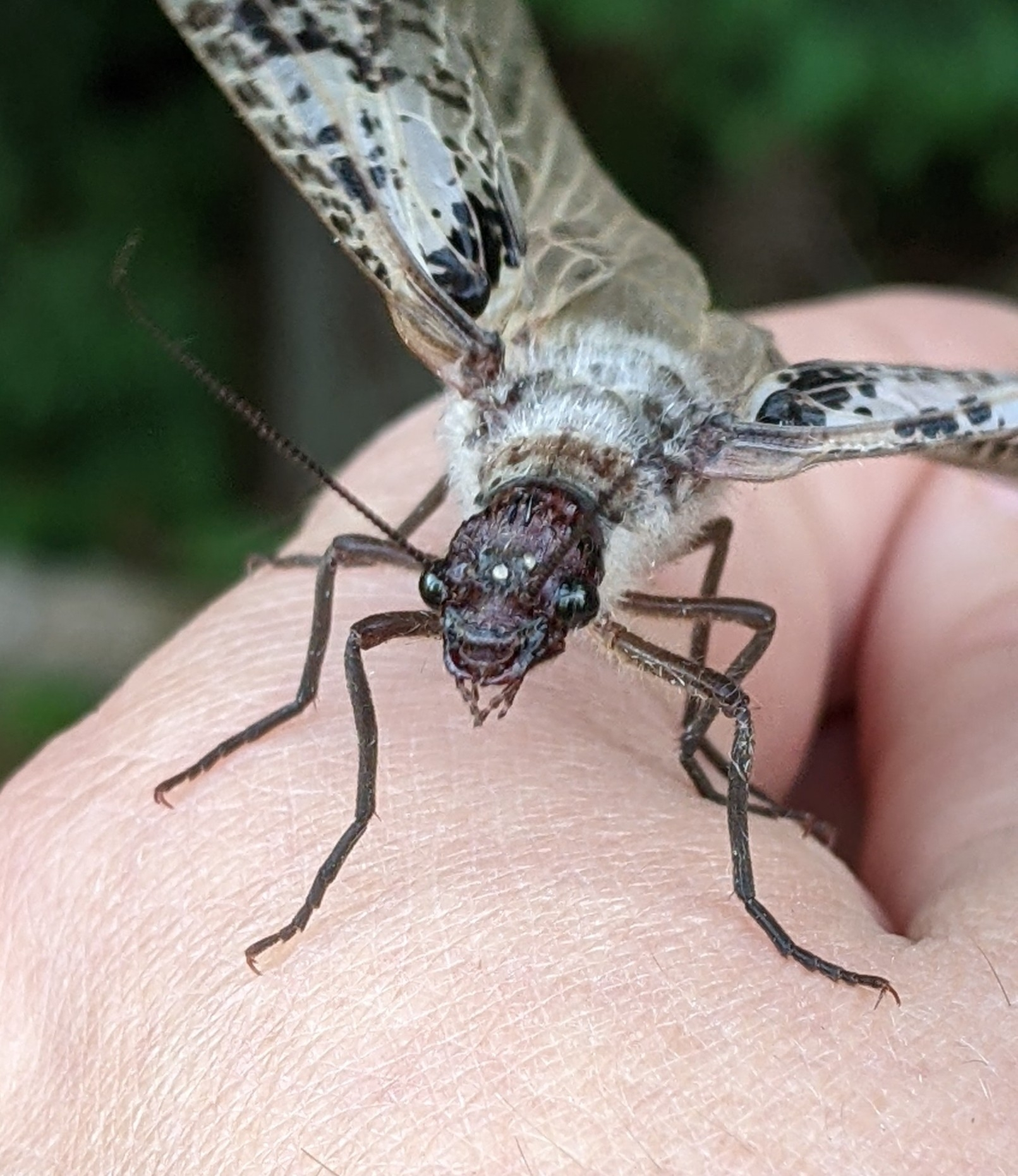
Head closeup

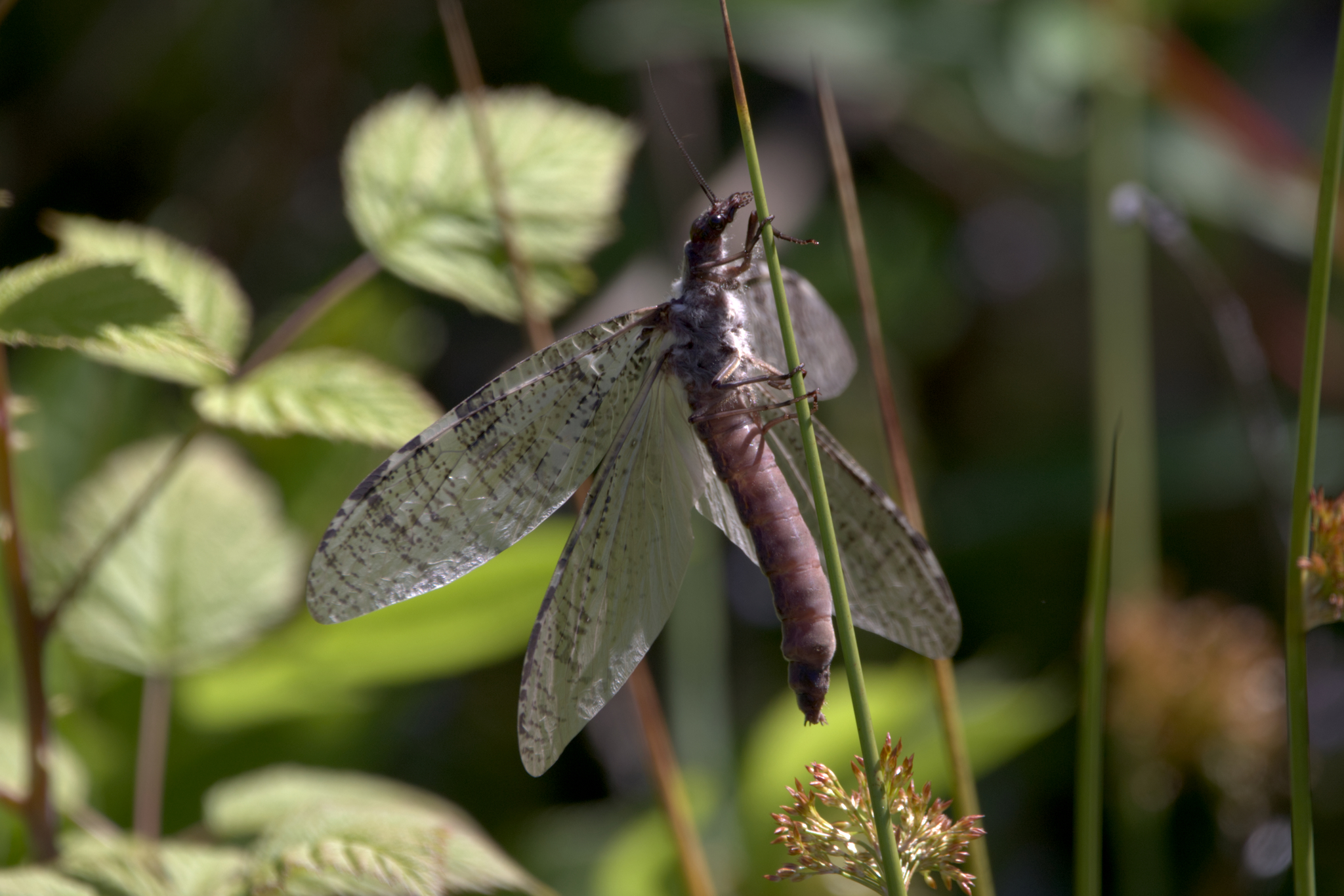
Showing underside

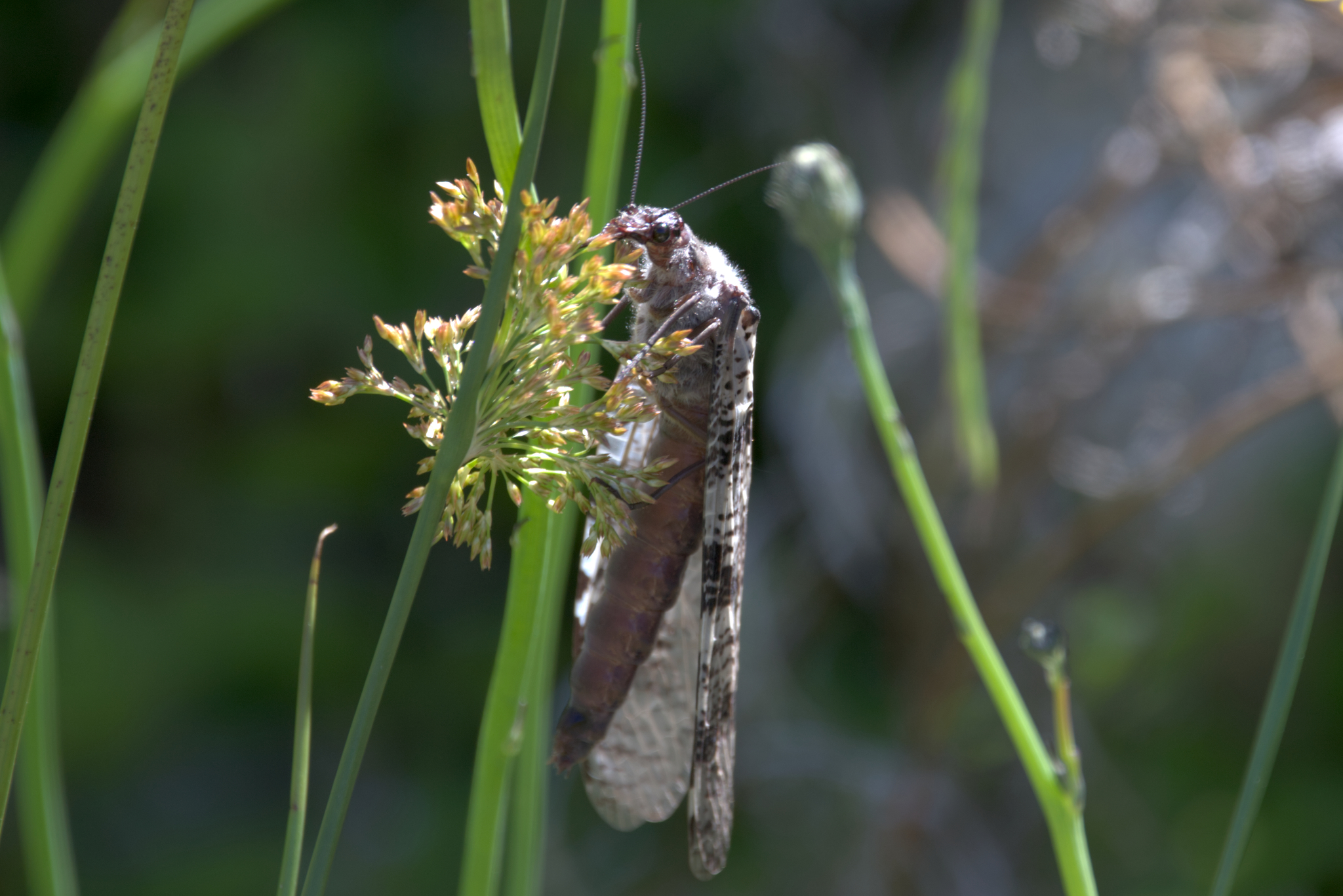
On a grass flower
