= Protochauliodes montivagus =

Scientific classification
- Domain: Eukaryota
- Kingdom: Animalia
- Phylum: Arthropoda
- Class: Insecta
- Order: Megaloptera
- Family: Corydalidae
- Genus: Protochauliodes
- Species: P. montivagus

Binomial name
- Protochauliodes montivagus Chandler, 1954

Species of insect

Protochauliodes montivagus is a species of fishfly in the family Corydalidae. It is found in North America.
