= Protochauliodes minimus =

Scientific classification
- Domain: Eukaryota
- Kingdom: Animalia
- Phylum: Arthropoda
- Class: Insecta
- Order: Megaloptera
- Family: Corydalidae
- Genus: Protochauliodes
- Species: P. minimus

Binomial name
- Protochauliodes minimus (Davis, 1903)

Synonyms
- Neohermes infuscatus Caudell, 1933

Species of insect

Protochauliodes minimus is a species of fishfly in the family Corydalidae. It is found in North America.
