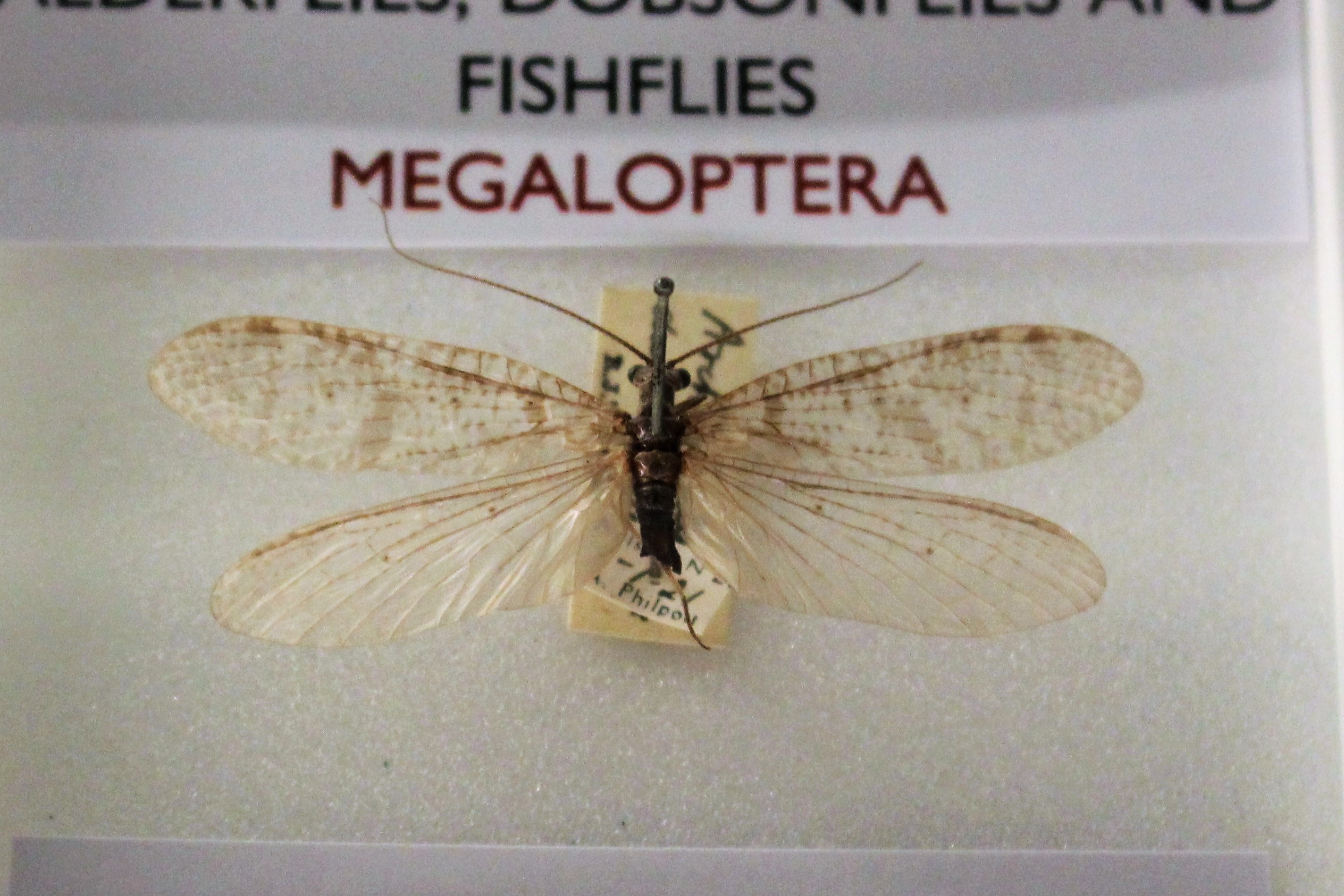
- Specimen found in 2018

Scientific classification
- Domain: Eukaryota
- Kingdom: Animalia
- Phylum: Arthropoda
- Class: Insecta
- Order: Megaloptera
- Family: Corydalidae
- Genus: Protochauliodes
- Species: P. dubitatus

Binomial name
- Protochauliodes dubitatus (Walker, 1853)

Synonyms
- Hermes dubitatus Walker, 1853; Chauliodes dubitatus (Walker, 1853); Archichauliodes dubitatus (Walker, 1853); Austrochauliodes dubitatus (Walker, 1853)

= Protochauliodes dubitatus =

Species of fishfly

Protochauliodes dubitatus is a species of fishfly in the family Corydalidae. The species was formally described in 1853 by English entomologist Francis Walker under the name Hermes dubitatus. Its distribution is unknown, with a plausibility being somewhere in South America; despite the mystery surrounding its whereabouts, it is known that the species is absent in Australia and New Zealand.
