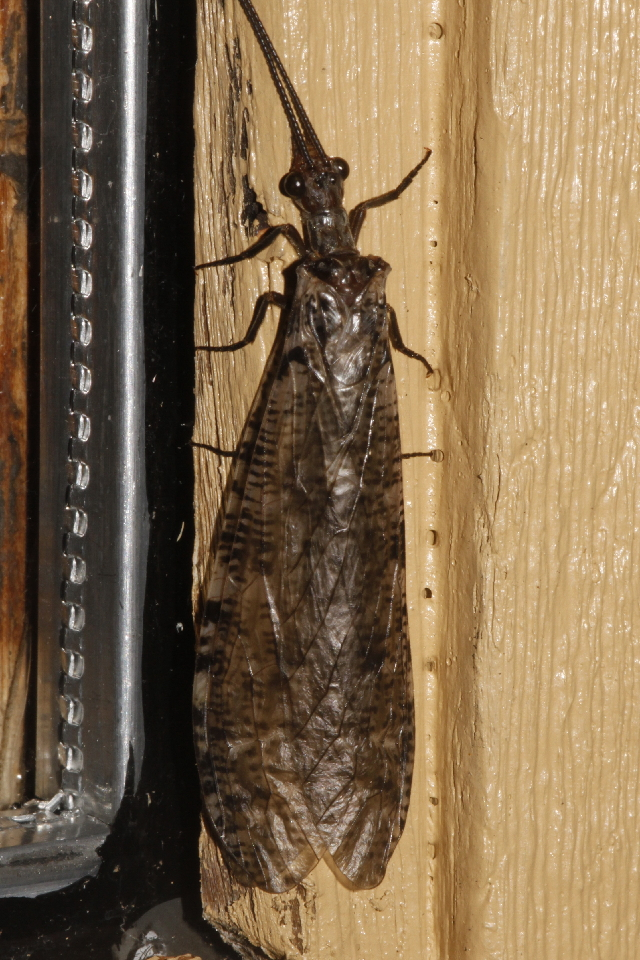
- Protochauliodes spenceri

Scientific classification
- Domain: Eukaryota
- Kingdom: Animalia
- Phylum: Arthropoda
- Class: Insecta
- Order: Megaloptera
- Family: Corydalidae
- Subfamily: Chauliodinae
- Genus: Protochauliodes; Weele, 1909

= Protochauliodes =

Genus of insects

Protochauliodes is a genus of fishflies in the family Corydalidae. There are about 13 described species in Protochauliodes.

== Species ==
These 13 species belong to the genus Protochauliodes:

- Protochauliodes aridus Maddux, 1954
- Protochauliodes biconicus Kimmins, 1954
- Protochauliodes bullocki Flint, 1973
- Protochauliodes cascadius Evans, 1984
- Protochauliodes cinerascens (Blanchard, 1851)
- Protochauliodes dubitatus (Walker, 1853)
- Protochauliodes eungella Theischinger, 1988
- Protochauliodes humeralis (Banks, 1908)
- Protochauliodes kirramae Theischinger, 1983
- Protochauliodes minimus (Davis, 1903)
- Protochauliodes montivagus Chandler, 1954
- Protochauliodes simplus Chandler, 1954
- Protochauliodes spenceri Munroe, 1951
