= Protochauliodes aridus =

Scientific classification
- Domain: Eukaryota
- Kingdom: Animalia
- Phylum: Arthropoda
- Class: Insecta
- Order: Megaloptera
- Family: Corydalidae
- Genus: Protochauliodes
- Species: P. aridus

Binomial name
- Protochauliodes aridus Maddux, 1954

Species of insect

Protochauliodes aridus is a species of fishfly in the family Corydalidae. It is found in North America.
