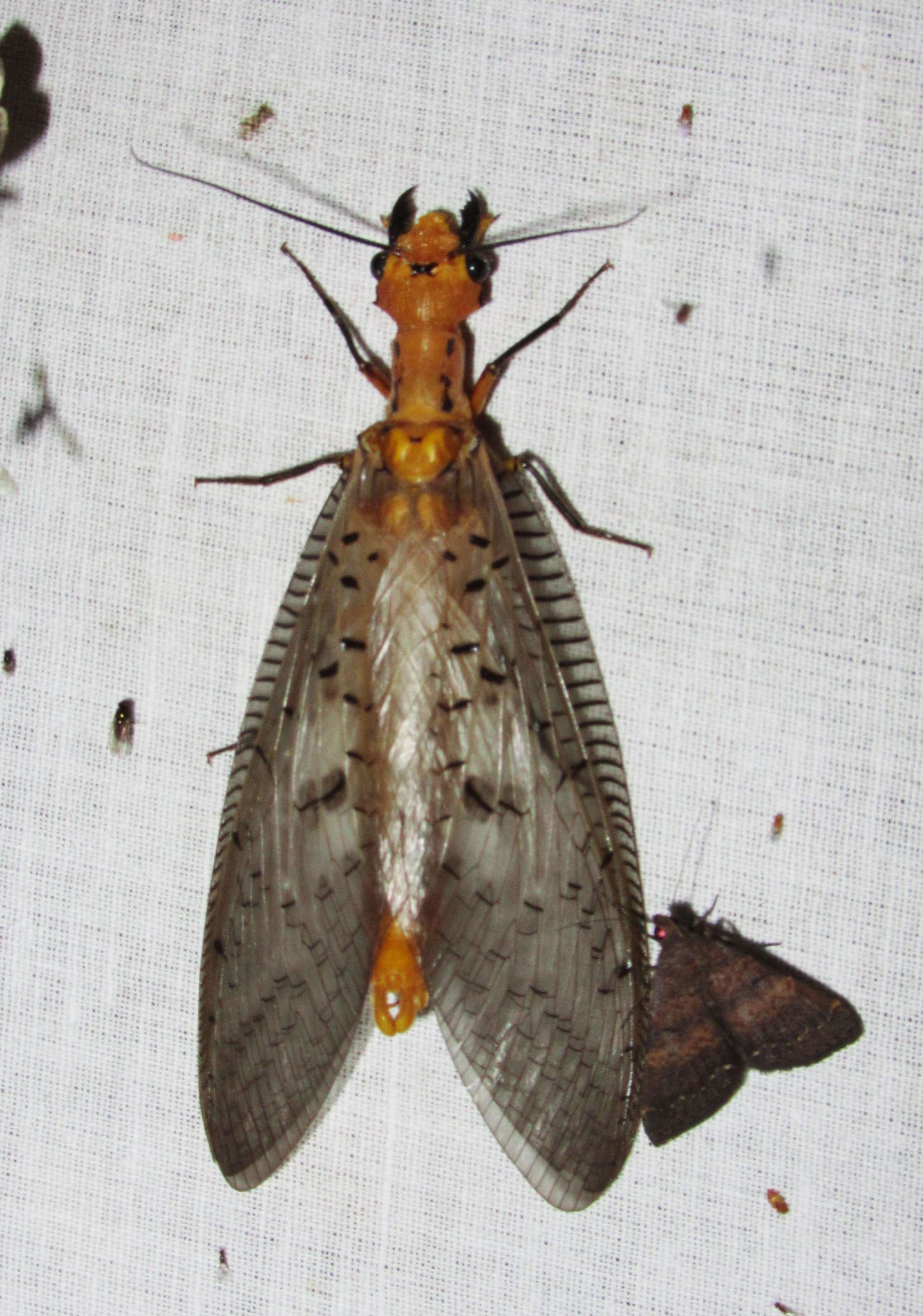

Scientific classification
- Domain: Eukaryota
- Kingdom: Animalia
- Phylum: Arthropoda
- Class: Insecta
- Order: Megaloptera
- Family: Corydalidae
- Genus: Neoneuromus
- Species: N. sikkimmensis

Binomial name
- Neoneuromus sikkimmensis (van der Weele, 1907)

= Neoneuromus sikkimmensis =

Species of insect

Neoneuromus sikkimmensis is a species of dobsonfly found in the China, India, Laos, Thailand, and Vietnam.

They are identifiable by the yellow head and prothorax and the pair of narrow black stripes along the margin of the head and behind the eyes. The forewing has pale smoky brown on the distal half and a markings is found on the second crossvein between the anterior cubital and the posterior medial veins. The male has the 9th sternite narrowed at the apex.
