= List of birds of Glacier National Park (U.S.) =

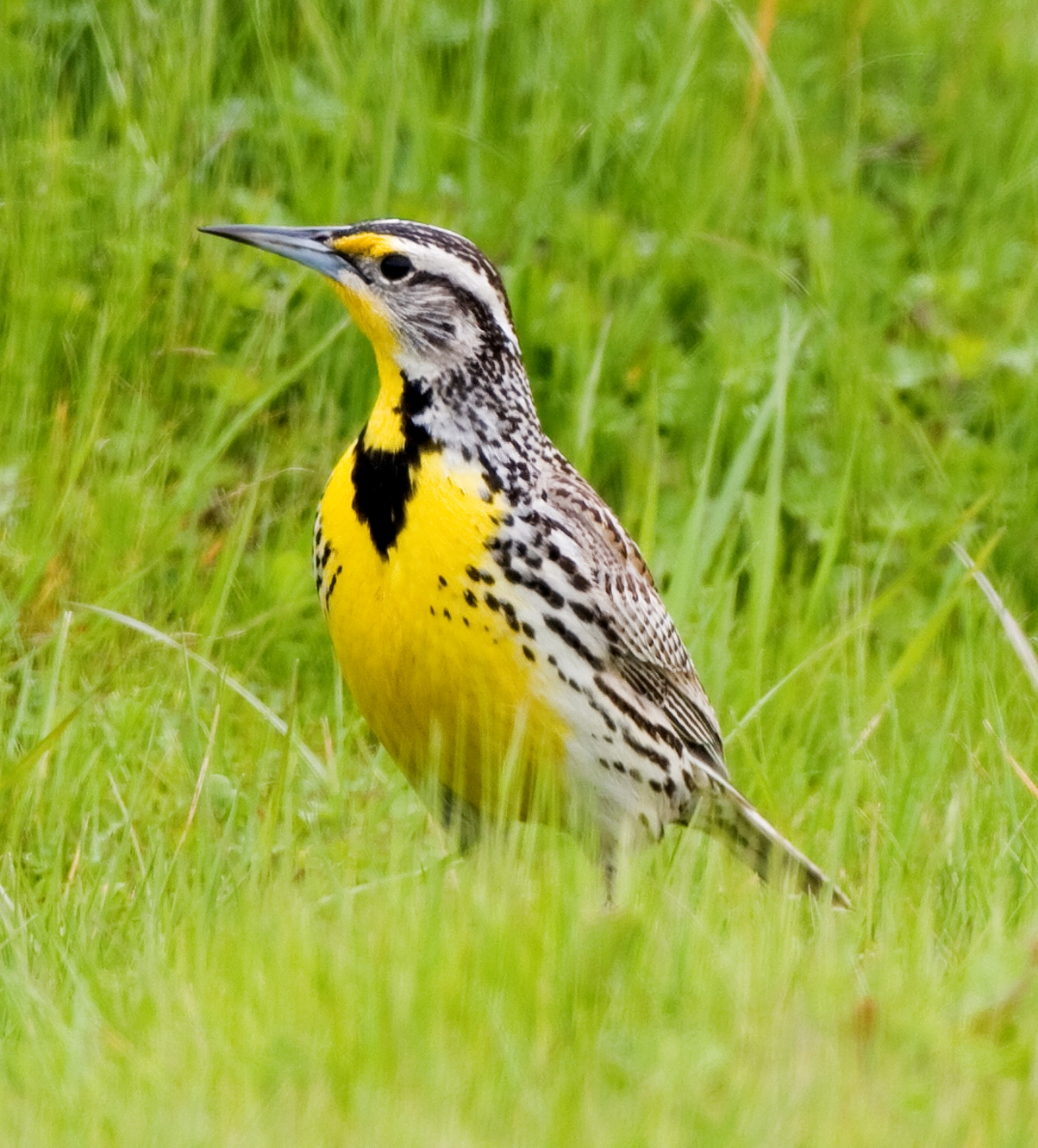
The western meadowlark is the state bird of Montana.

This is a comprehensive list of the bird species recorded in Glacier National Park, which is in the U.S. state of Montana. The list is based on the Glacier Bird Checklist published by the National Park Service dated November 2015. The checklist contains 275 species when updated to the latest taxonomy.

This list is presented in the taxonomic sequence of the Check-list of North and Middle American Birds, 7th edition through the 66th Supplement, published by the American Ornithological Society (AOS). Common and scientific names are also those of the Check-list, except that the common names of families are from the Clements taxonomy because the AOS list does not include them.

== Legend ==
As listed in the Glacier Bird Checklist

- Seasonal codes
  - SP = spring (March–May)
  - S = summer (June–August)
  - F = fall (September–November)
  - W = winter (December–February)
- Location codes
  - N = nests in park
  - E = found east of Continental Divide
  - W = found west of Continental Divide
  - A = occurs in alpine areas
  - I = Introduced species
- Abundance codes
  - ab = abundant
  - c = common
  - u = uncommon
  - r = rare
  - a = accidental

== Ducks, geese, and waterfowl ==
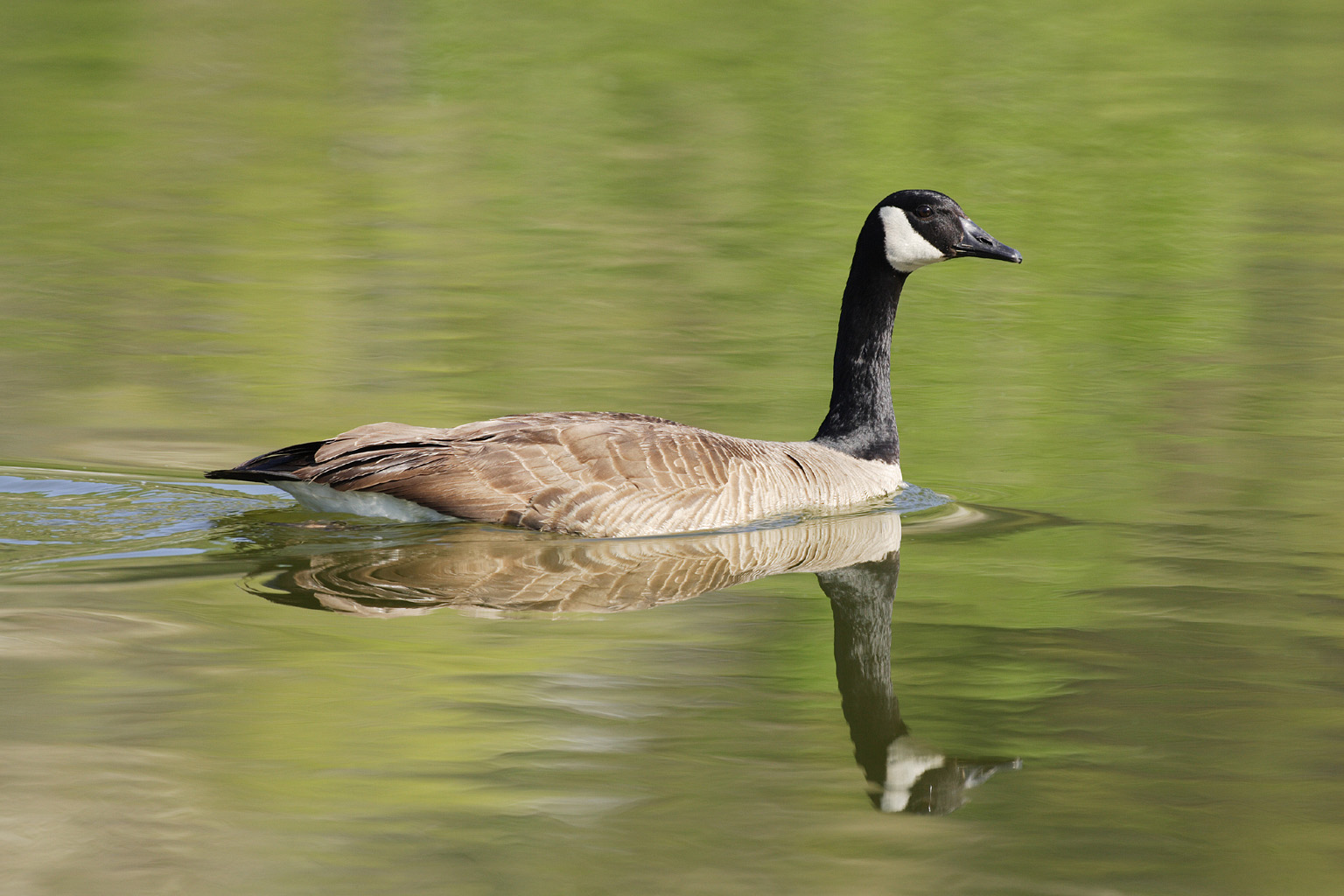
Canada goose

Order: Anseriformes Family: Anatidae

The family Anatidae includes the ducks and most duck-like waterfowl, such as geese and swans. These birds are adapted to an aquatic existence with webbed feet, bills which are flattened to a greater or lesser extent, and feathers that are excellent at shedding water due to special oils. Thirty-two species have been recorded in the park.

- Snow goose, Chen caerulescens; E, W, SP=u, S=r, F=u
- Ross's goose, Chen rossii; E, W, SP=r
- Greater white-fronted goose, Anser albifrons; W, F=r
- Canada goose, Branta canadensis; N, E, W, SP=c, S=c, F=c, W=u
- Trumpeter swan, Cygnus buccinator; N, E, W, SP=r, S=u, F=r, W=r
- Tundra swan, Cygnus columbianus; E, W, SP=c, F=c, W=r
- Wood duck, Aix sponsa; N, E, W, SP=r, S=r, F=r, W=r
- Blue-winged teal, Spatula discors; E, W, SP=u, S=u, F=u
- Cinnamon teal, Spatula cyanoptera; E, W, SP=u, S=u, F=u
- Northern shoveler, Spatula clypeata; E, W, SP=c, S=u, F=u, W=r
- Gadwall, Mareca strepera; E, W, SP=u, S=u, F=u, W=r
- Eurasian wigeon, Mareca penelope; W, SP=a, S=a, F=a
- American wigeon, Mareca americana; E, W, SP=c, S=c, F=c, W=r
- Mallard, Anas platyrhynchos; N, E, W, SP=c, S=c, F=c, W=c
- Northern pintail, Anas acuta; E, W, SP=u, S=u, F=u, W=r
- Green-winged teal, Anas crecca; E, W, SP=u, S=u, F=u
- Canvasback, Aythya valisineria; E, W, SP=r, F=r
- Redhead, Aythya americana; E, W, SP=u, F=u, W=r
- Ring-necked duck, Aythya collaris; N, E, W, SP=c, S=u, F=u
- Greater scaup, Aythya marila; W, SP=a
- Lesser scaup, Aythya affinis; E, W, SP=u, S=u, F=u, W=r
- Harlequin duck, Histrionicus histrionicus; N, E, W, SP=u, S=u, F=r
- Surf scoter, Melanitta perspicillata; W, SP=r, F=r
- White-winged scoter, Melanitta fusca; E, W, SP=u, F=u
- Long-tailed duck, Clangula hyemalis; W, F=a
- Bufflehead, Bucephala albeola; N, E, W, SP=c, S=c, F=c, W=u
- Common goldeneye, Bucephala clangula; N, E, W, SP=c, S=r, F=u, W=c
- Barrow's goldeneye, Bucephala islandica; N, E, W, SP=c, S=c, F=c, W=r
- Hooded merganser, Lophodytes cucullatus; N, E, W, SP=u, S=u, F=u, W=r
- Common merganser, Mergus merganser; N, E, W, SP=c, S=c, F=c, W=c
- Red-breasted merganser, Mergus serrator; N, E, W, SP=r, S=r, F=r, W=r
- Ruddy duck, Oxyura jamaicensis; E, W, SP=u, S=r, F=u

== Pheasants, grouse, and allies ==
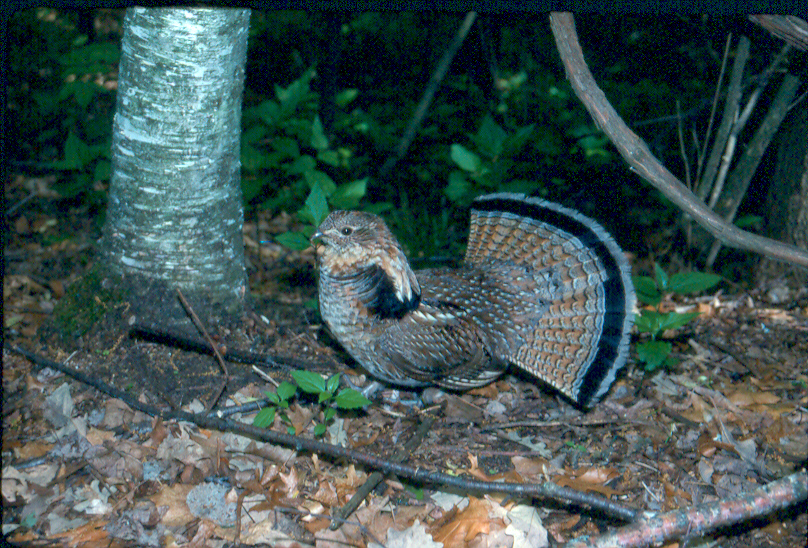
Ruffed grouse

Order: Galliformes Family: Phasianidae

Phasianidae consists of the pheasants and their allies. These are terrestrial species, variable in size but generally plump with broad relatively short wings. Many species are gamebirds or have been domesticated as a food source for humans. Seven species have been recorded in the park.

- Wild turkey, Meleagris gallopavo; W, S=r
- Ruffed grouse, Bonasa umbellus; N, E, W, SP=c, S=c, F=c, W=c
- Spruce grouse, Canachites canadensis; N, E, W, SP=c, S=c, F=c, W=c
- White-tailed ptarmigan, Lagopus leucurus; N, A, SP=u, S=u, F=u, W=u
- Dusky grouse, Dendragapus obscurus; N, E, W, A SP=c, S=c, F=c, W=c
- Sharp-tailed grouse, Tympanuchus phasianellus; E, W=r
- Ring-necked pheasant, Phasianus colchicus; N, W, I, SP=a

== Grebes ==
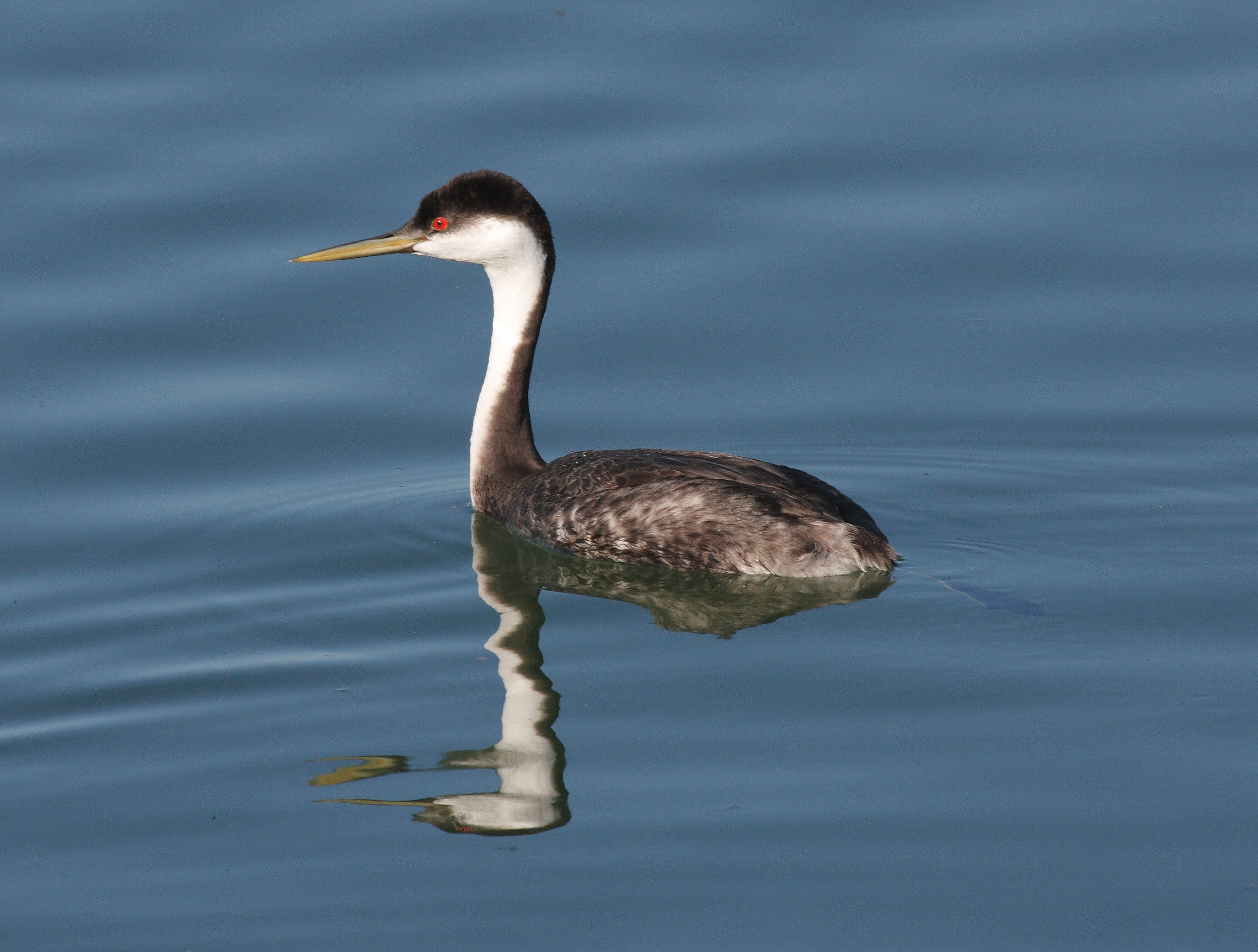
Western grebe

Order: Podicipediformes Family: Podicipedidae

Grebes are small to medium-large freshwater diving birds. They have lobed toes and are excellent swimmers and divers. However, they have their feet placed far back on the body, making them quite ungainly on land. Five species have been recorded in the park.

- Pied-billed grebe, Podilymbus podiceps; E, W, SP=r, S=r, F=r, W=r
- Horned grebe, Podiceps auritus; E, W, SP=c, S=u, F=u, W=u
- Red-necked grebe, Podiceps grisegena; E, W, SP=u, S=u, F=u, W=r
- Eared grebe, Podiceps nigricollis; E, W, SP=u, S=r, F=r
- Western grebe, Aechmorphorus occidentalis; E, W, SP=u, S=r, F=u, W=r

== Pigeons and doves ==
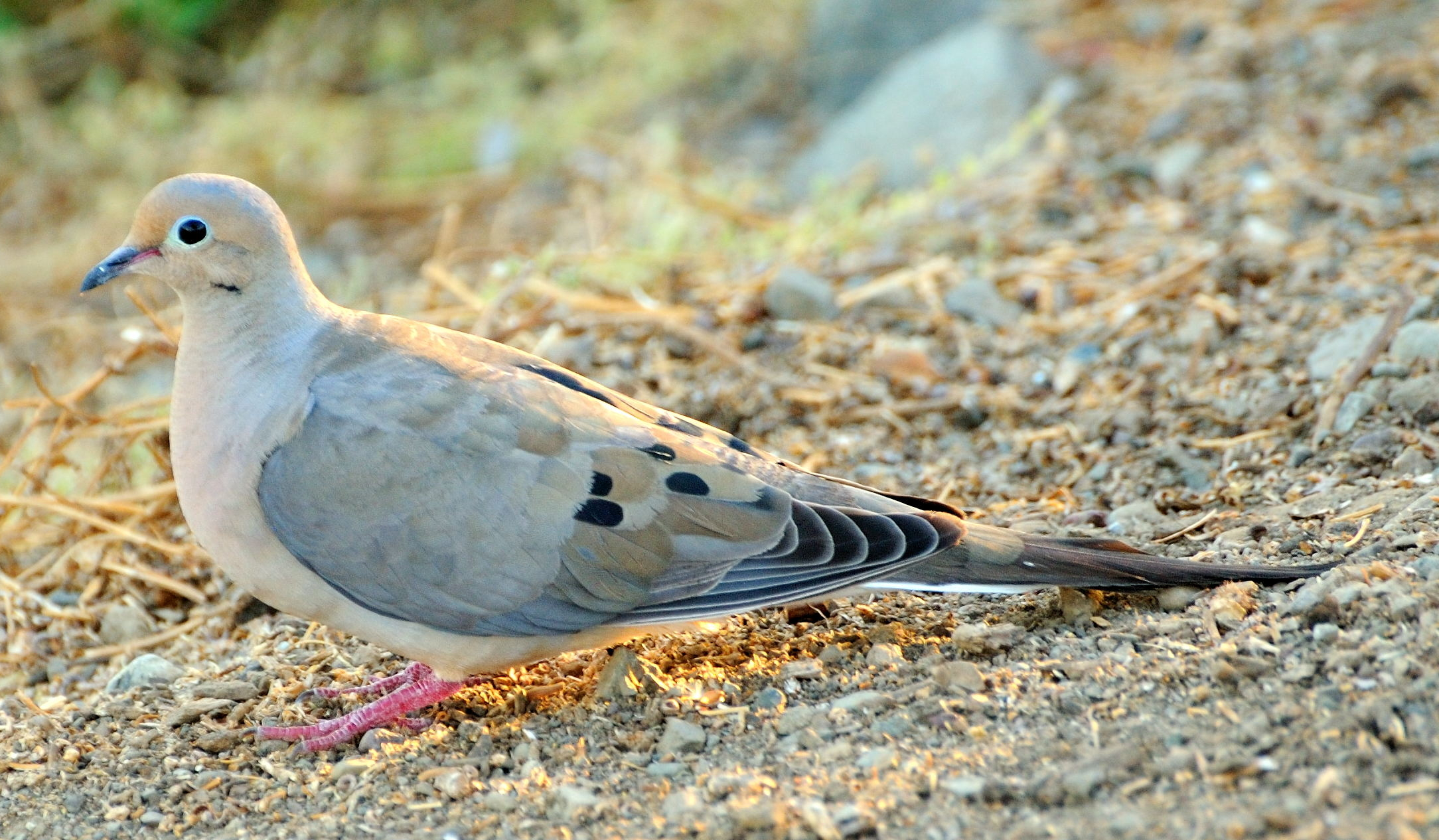
Mourning dove

Order: Columbiformes Family: Columbidae

Pigeons and doves are stout-bodied birds with short necks and short slender bills with a fleshy cere. Four species have been recorded in the park.

- Mourning dove, Zenaida macroura; E, W, SP=u, S=u, F=u
- Band-tailed pigeon, Patagioenas fasciata; W, F=a
- Eurasian collared-dove, Streptopelia decaocto; W, I, SP=r
- Rock pigeon, Columba livia; E, W, I, S=r, F=r

== Nightjars and allies ==
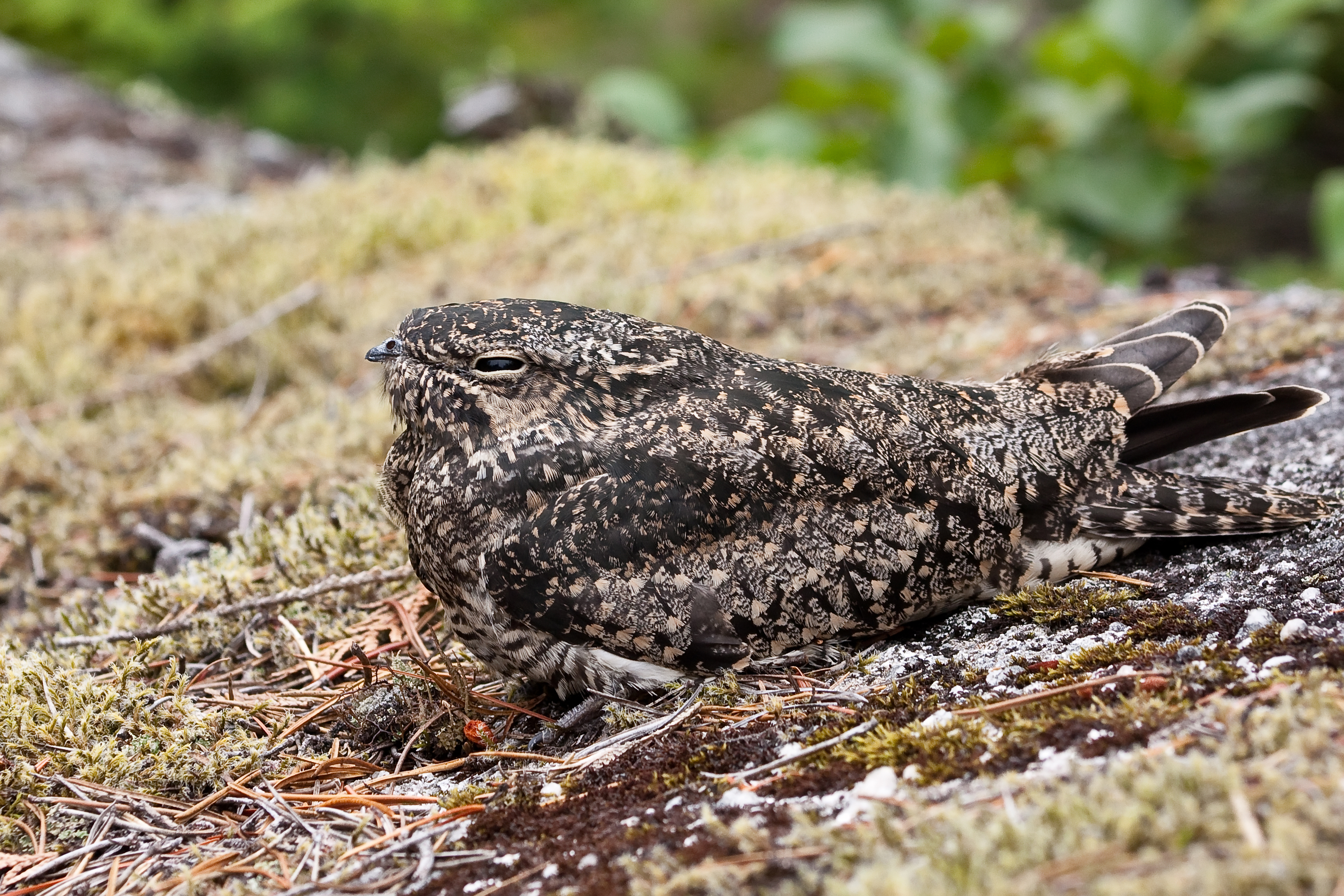
Common nighthawk

Order: Caprimulgiformes Family: Caprimulgidae

Nightjars are medium-sized nocturnal birds that usually nest on the ground. They have long wings, short legs, and very short bills. Most have small feet, of little use for walking, and long pointed wings. Their soft plumage is cryptically colored to resemble bark or leaves. One species has been recorded in the park.

- Common nighthawk, Chordeiles minor; N, E, W, SP=u, S=u, F=r

== Swifts ==
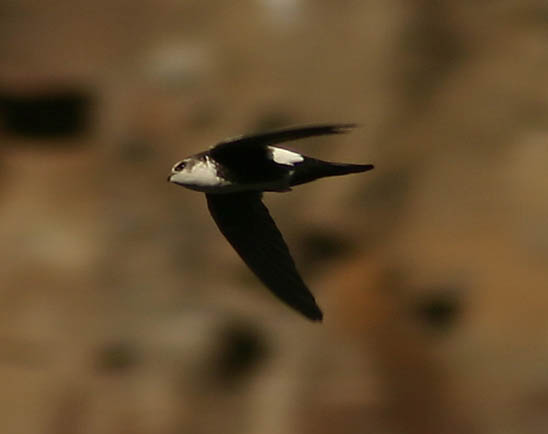
White-throated swift

Order: Apodiformes Family: Apodidae

The swifts are small birds which spend the majority of their lives flying. These birds have very short legs and never settle voluntarily on the ground, perching instead only on vertical surfaces. Many swifts have very long, swept-back wings which resemble a crescent or boomerang. Three species have been recorded in the park.

- Black swift, Cypseloides niger; N, E, W, SP=r, S=r, F=r
- Vaux's swift, Chaetura vauxi; N, E, W, SP=u, S=u
- White-throated swift, Aeronautes saxatalis; E, W, A, SP=a, S=a

== Hummingbirds ==
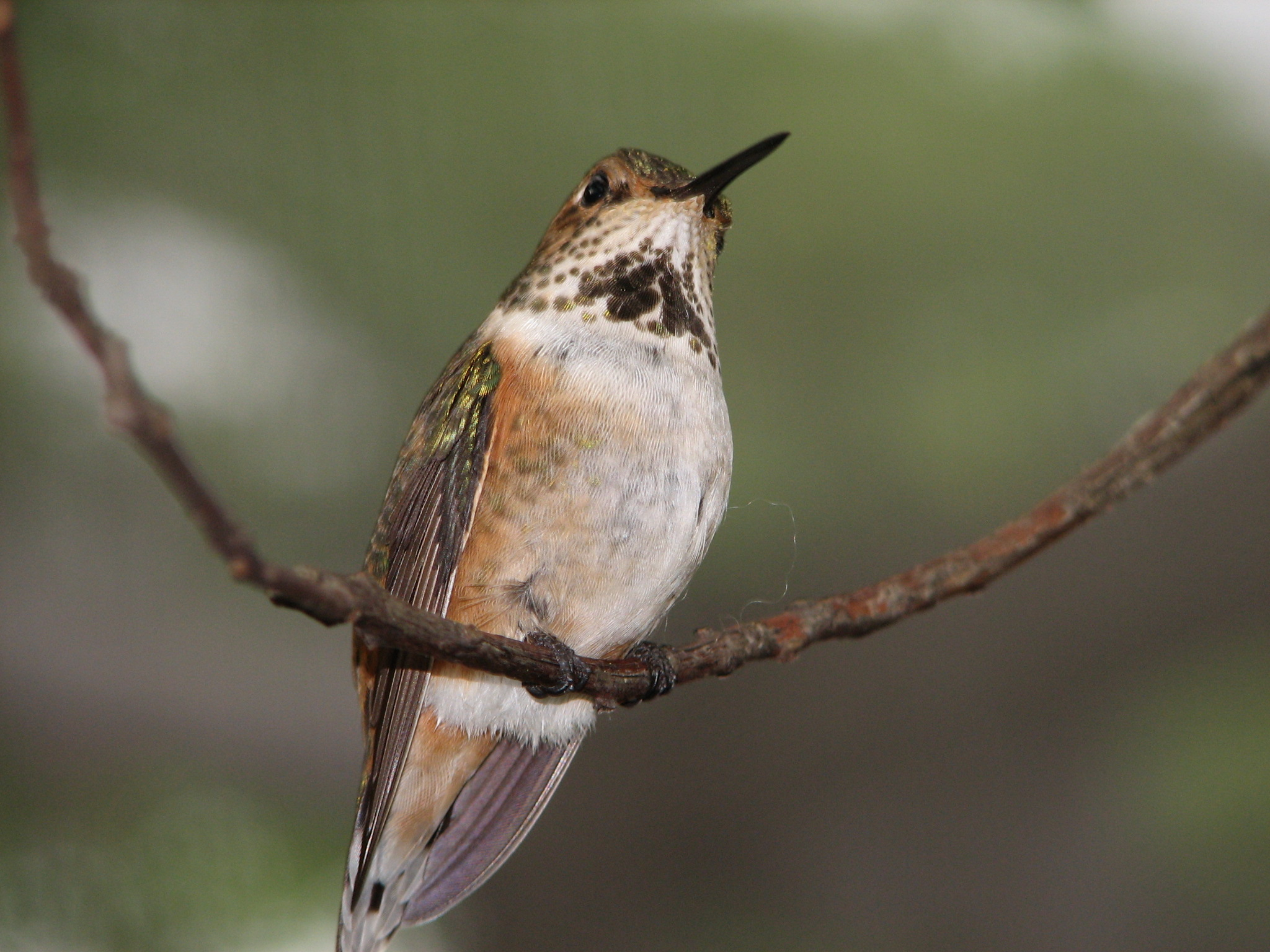
Calliope hummingbird

Order: Apodiformes Family: Trochilidae

Hummingbirds are small birds capable of hovering in mid-air due to the rapid flapping of their wings. They are the only birds that can fly backwards. Three species have been recorded in the park.

- Black-chinned hummingbird, Archilochus alexandri; N, W, SP=r, S=r
- Calliope hummingbird, Selasphorus calliope; N, E, W, A, SP=c, S=c
- Rufous hummingbird, Selasphorus rufus; N, E, W, A, SP=c, S=c

== Cranes ==
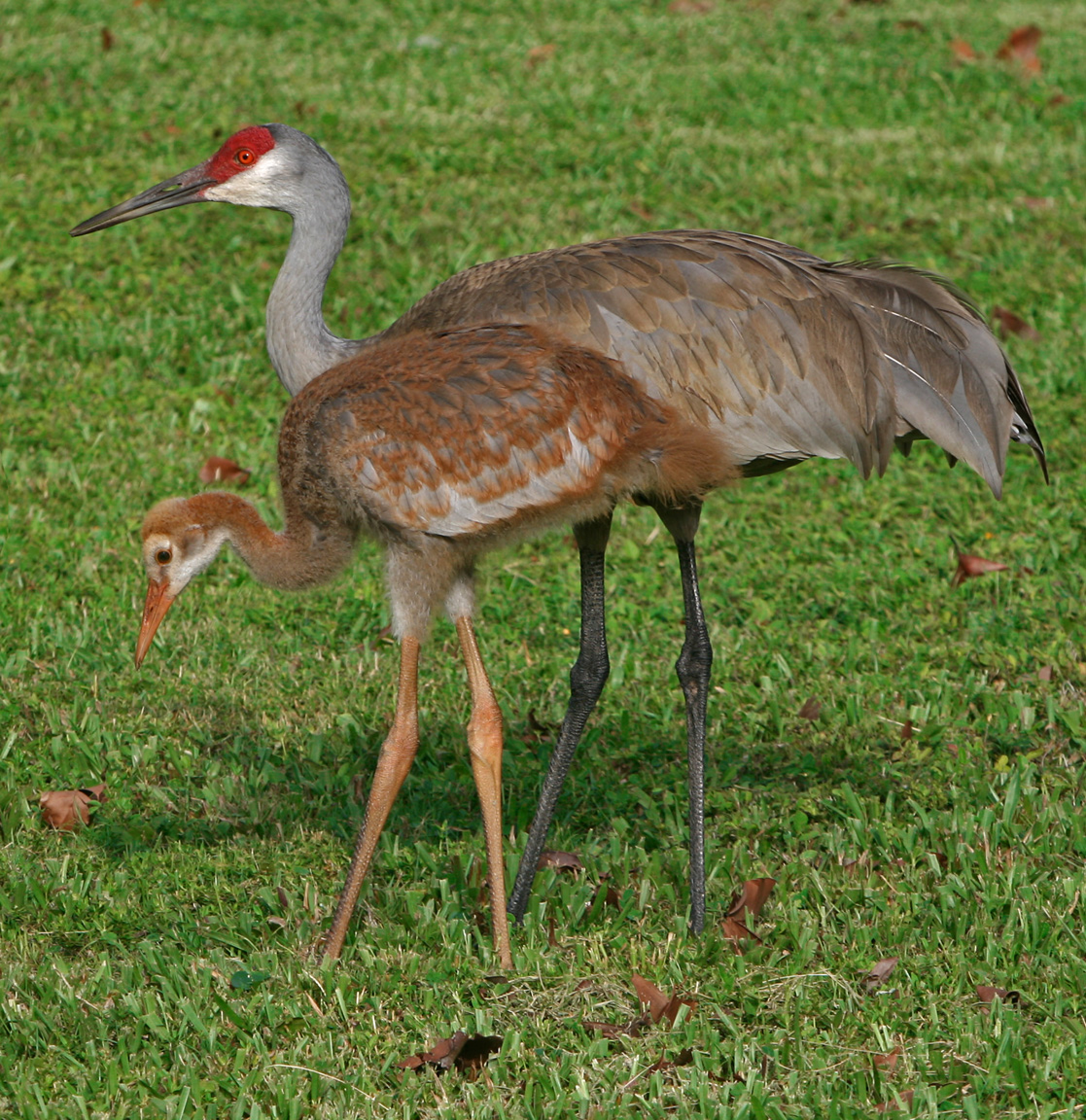
Sandhill crane

Order: Gruiformes Family: Gruidae

Cranes are large, long-legged, and long-necked birds. Unlike the similar-looking but unrelated herons, cranes fly with necks outstretched, not pulled back. Most have elaborate and noisy courting displays or "dances". One species has been recorded in the park.

- Sandhill crane, Antigone canadensis; N, E, W, SP=r, S=r, F=r

== Rails, gallinules, and coots ==
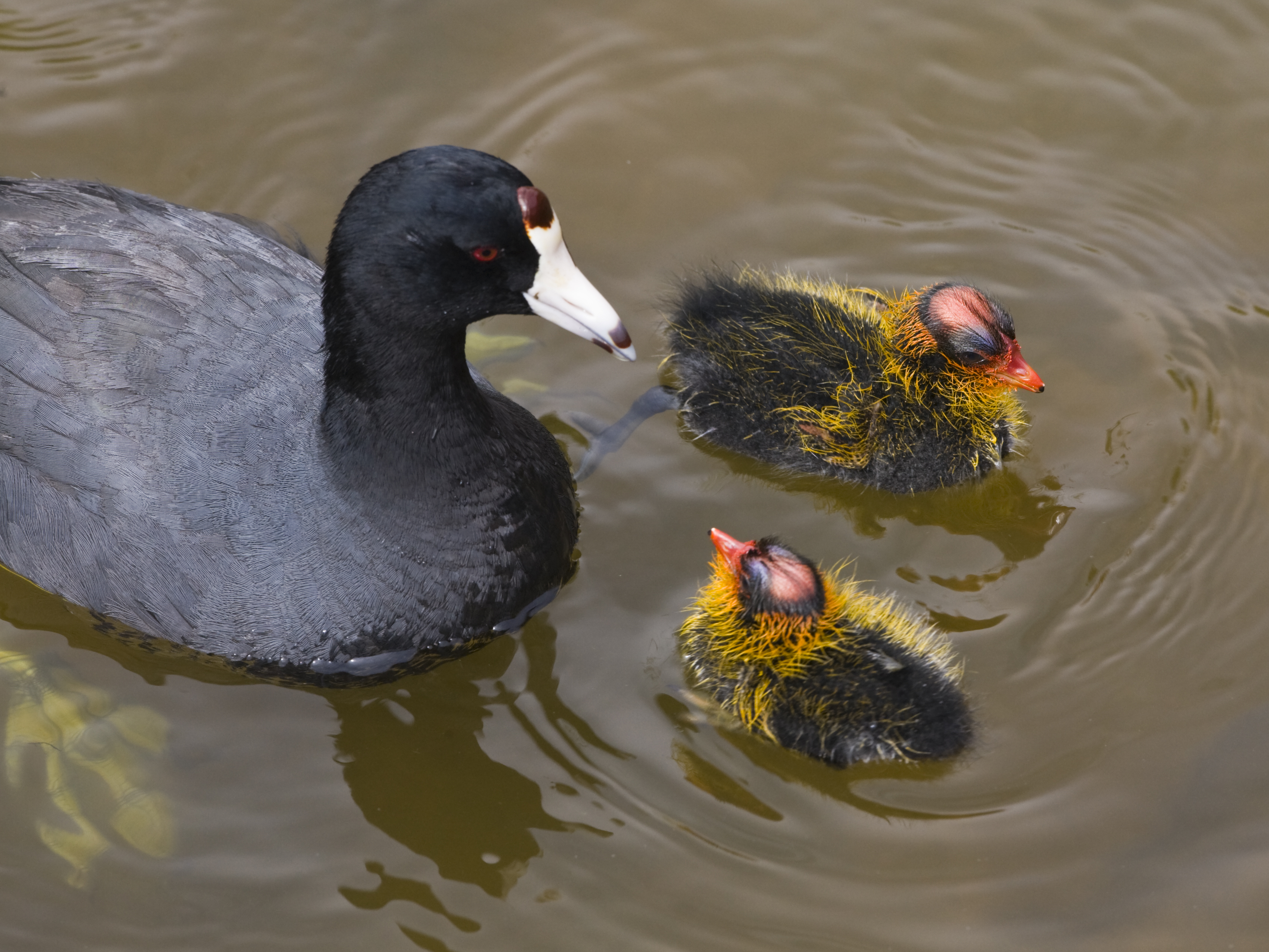
American coot

Order: Gruiformes Family: Rallidae

Rallidae is a large family of small to medium-sized birds which includes the rails, crakes, coots, and gallinules. The most typical family members occupy dense vegetation in damp environments near lakes, swamps, or rivers. In general they are shy and secretive birds, making them difficult to observe. Most species have strong legs and long toes which are well adapted to soft uneven surfaces. They tend to have short, rounded wings and tend to be weak fliers. Four species have been recorded in the park.

- Virginia rail, Rallus limicola; W, S=r
- Sora, Porzana carolina; N, E, W, SP=u, S=u
- American coot, Fulica americana; E, W, SP=c, S=c, F=c, W=r
- Yellow rail, Coturnicops noveboracensis; W, S=r

== Stilts and avocets ==
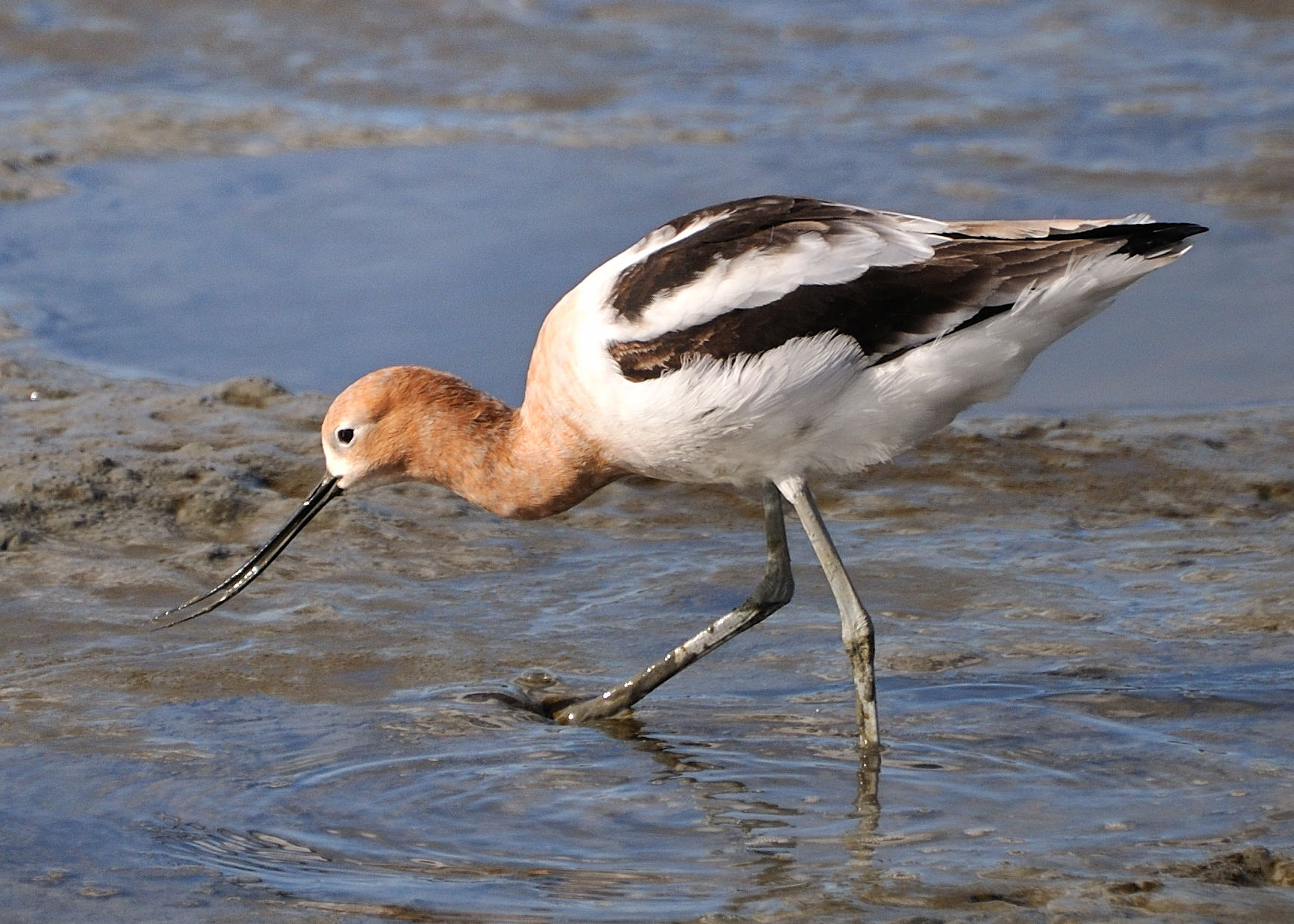
American avocet

Order: Charadriiformes Family: Recurvirostridae

Recurvirostridae is a family of large wading birds which includes the avocets and stilts. The avocets have long legs and long up-curved bills. The stilts have extremely long legs and long, thin, straight bills. Two species have been recorded in the park.

- Black-necked stilt, Himantopus mexicanus; E, W, SP=r
- American avocet, Recurvirostra americana; E, W, SP=r, F=r

== Plovers and lapwings ==
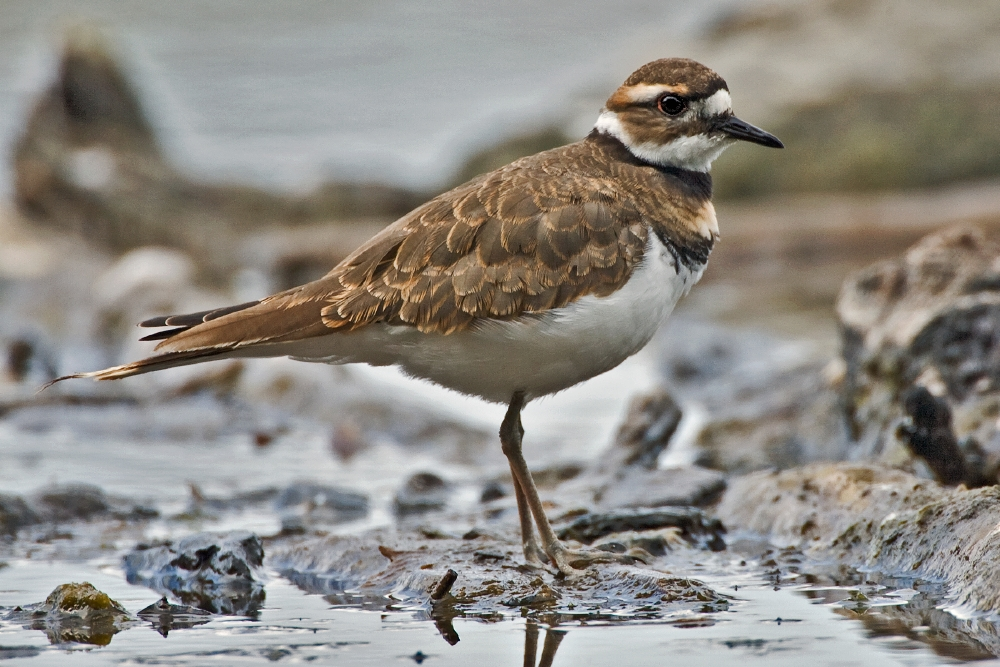
Killdeer

Order: Charadriiformes Family: Charadriidae

The family Charadriidae includes the plovers, dotterels, and lapwings. They are small to medium-sized birds with compact bodies, short thick necks, and long, usually pointed, wings. They are found in open country worldwide, mostly in habitats near water. Three species have been recorded in the park.

- Black-bellied plover, Pluvialis squatarola; E, W, SP=a, F=a
- Killdeer, Charadrius vociferus; N, E, W, SP=c, S=c, F=c, W=r
- Semipalmated plover, Charadrius semipalmatus; E, W, SP=a, S=a

== Sandpipers and allies ==
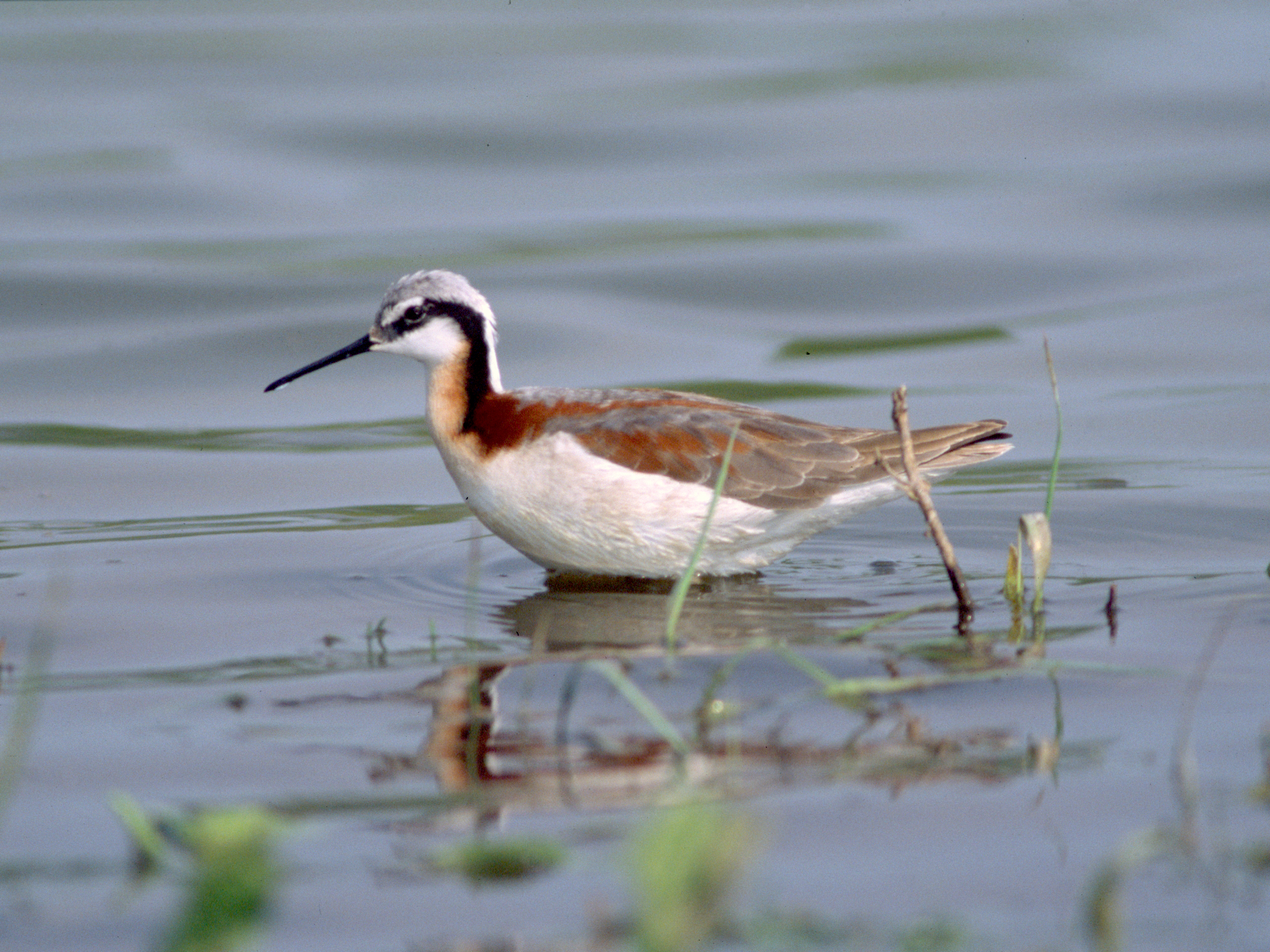
Wilson's phalarope

Order: Charadriiformes Family: Scolopacidae

Scolopacidae is a large diverse family of small to medium-sized shorebirds including the sandpipers, curlews, godwits, shanks, tattlers, woodcocks, snipes, dowitchers, and phalaropes. The majority of these species eat small invertebrates picked out of the mud or soil. Different lengths of legs and bills enable multiple species to feed in the same habitat, particularly on the coast, without direct competition for food. Eighteen species have been recorded in the park.

- Upland sandpiper, Bartramia longicauda; E, SP=r
- Long-billed curlew, Numenius americanus; E, W, SP=u
- Marbled godwit, Limosa fedoa; E, W, SP=r
- Sanderling, Calidris alba; W, F=r
- Baird's sandpiper, Calidris bairdii; E, W, SP=r, S=r, F=r
- Least sandpiper, Calidris minutilla; W, F=r
- Pectoral sandpiper, Calidris melanotos; E, W, SP=r
- Semipalmated sandpiper, Calidris pusilla; W, S=r, F=r
- Western sandpiper, Calidris mauri; W, SP=r, F=r
- Long-billed dowitcher, Limnodromus scolopaceus; E, W, SP=r
- Wilson's snipe, Gallinago delicata; N, E, W, SP=c, S=c, F=u
- Spotted sandpiper, Actitis macularia; N, E, W, SP=u, S=c, F=c
- Solitary sandpiper, Tringa solitaria; E, W, SP=u, S=u, F=u
- Lesser yellowlegs, Tringa flavipes; E, W, SP=r, S=r
- Willet, Tringa semipalmata; E, W, SP=r, S=r
- Greater yellowlegs, Tringa melanoleuca; E, W, SP=r
- Wilson's phalarope, Phalaropus tricolor; E, W, SP=u, F=u
- Red-necked phalarope, Phalaropus lobatus; E, W, SP=r, S=r, F=r

== Gulls, terns, and skimmers ==
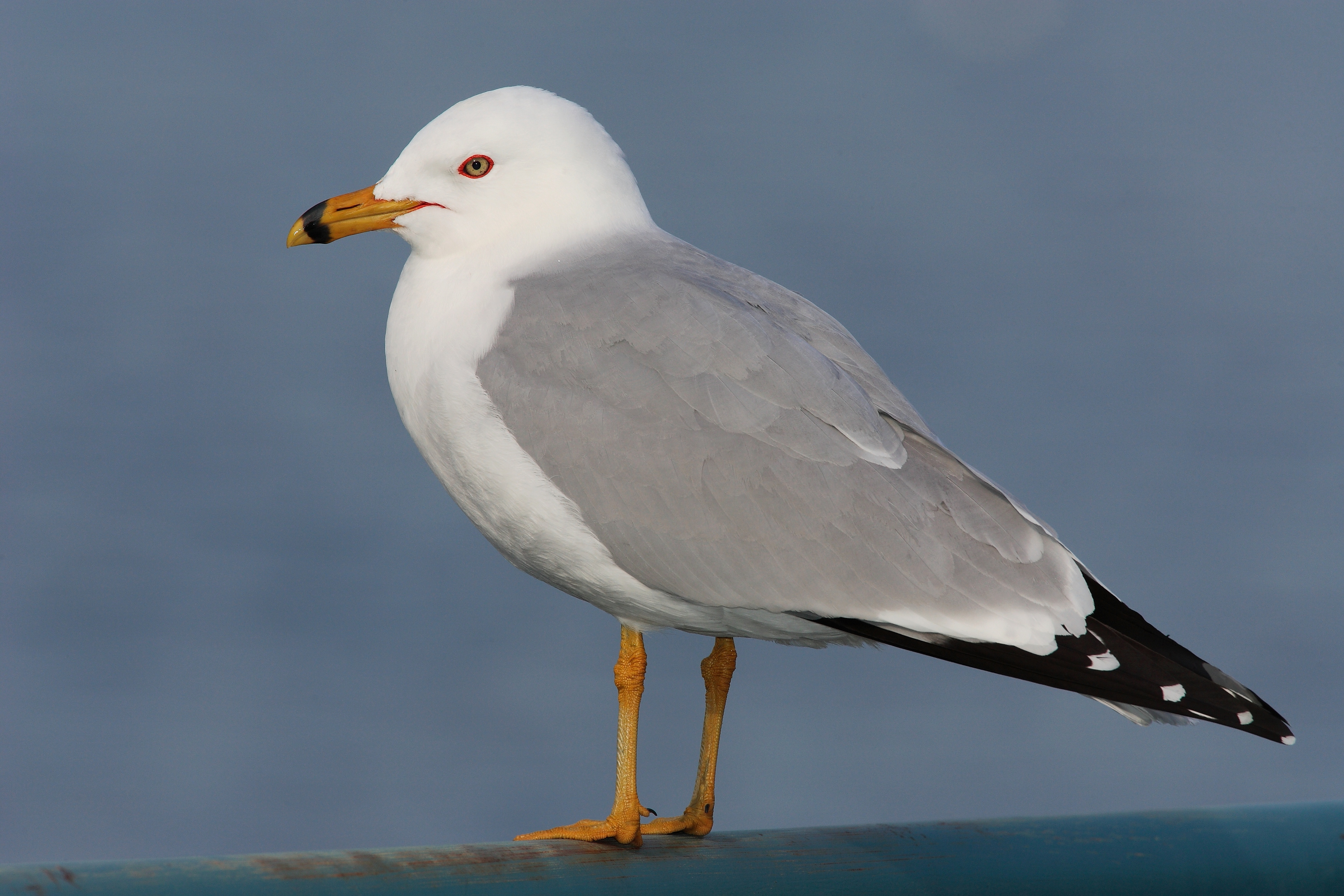
Ring-billed gull

Order: Charadriiformes Family: Laridae

Laridae is a family of medium to large seabirds and includes gulls, terns, kittiwakes, and skimmers. They are typically gray or white, often with black markings on the head or wings. They have stout, longish bills and webbed feet. Thirteen species have been recorded in the park.

- Black-legged kittiwake, Rissa tridactyla; W, F=a
- Sabine's gull, Xema sabini; W, SP=a
- Bonaparte's gull, Larus philadelphia; E, W, SP=r, F=u
- Franklin's gull, Larus pipixcan; E, W, SP=u, S=u
- Ring-billed gull, Larus delawarensis; E, W, SP=c, S=u, F=c
- California gull, Larus californicus; E, W, SP=c, S=u, F=c
- Herring gull, Larus argentatus; E, W, F=r
- Glaucous-winged gull, Larus glaucescens; W, F=a
- Glaucous gull, Larus hyperboreus; W, F=a
- Caspian tern, Hydroprogne caspia; E, W, SP=r, S=r
- Black tern, Chlidonias niger; N, E, W, SP=r, S=r
- Common tern, Sterna hirundo; E, SP=r, F=r
- Forster's tern, Sterna forsteri; E, W, F=r

== Loons ==
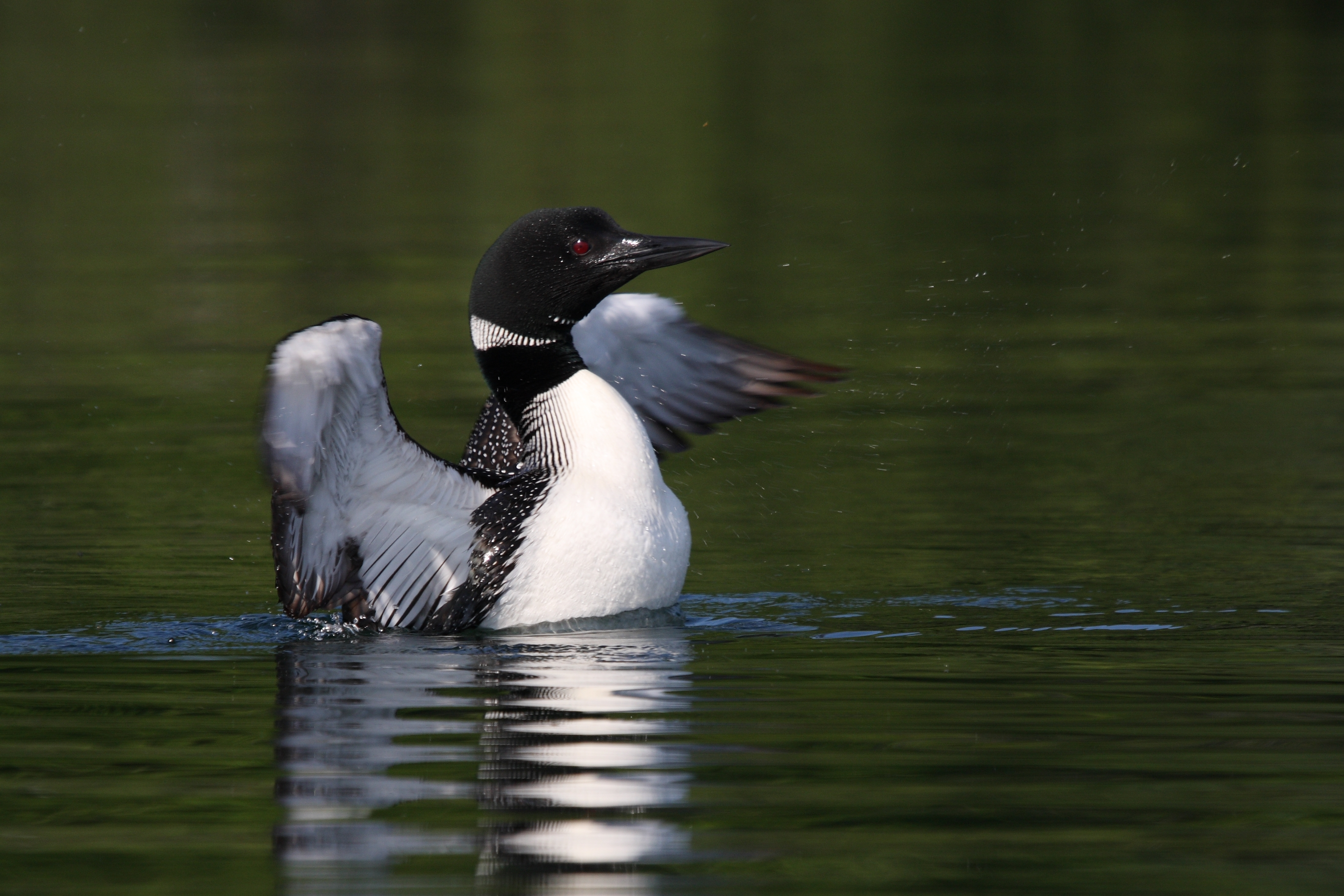
Common loon

Order: Gaviiformes Family: Gaviidae

Loons are aquatic birds the size of a large duck, to which they are unrelated. Their plumage is largely gray or black, and they have spear-shaped bills. Loons swim well and fly adequately, but are almost hopeless on land, because their legs are placed towards the rear of the body. Four species have been recorded in the park.

- Red-throated loon, Gavia stellata; W, F=a
- Pacific loon, Gavia pacifica; W, F=r, W=r
- Common loon, Gavia immer; N, E, W, SP=u, S=u, F=u, W=r
- Yellow-billed loon, Gavia adamsii; W, SP=a

== Cormorants and shags ==
Order: Suliformes Family: Phalacrocoracidae

Cormorants are medium-to-large aquatic birds, usually with mainly dark plumage and areas of colored skin on the face. The bill is long, thin and sharply hooked. Their feet are four-toed and webbed. One species has been recorded in the park.

- Double-crested cormorant, Nannopterum auritum auritus; E, W, SP=r, S=r, F=r, W=r

== Pelicans ==
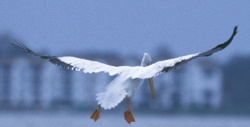
American white pelican

Order: Pelecaniformes Family: Pelecanidae

Pelicans are very large water birds with a distinctive pouch under their beak. Like other birds in the order Pelecaniformes, they have four webbed toes. One species has been recorded in the park.

- American white pelican, Pelecanus erythrorhynchos; E, W, SP=r, S=r

== Herons, egrets, and bitterns ==
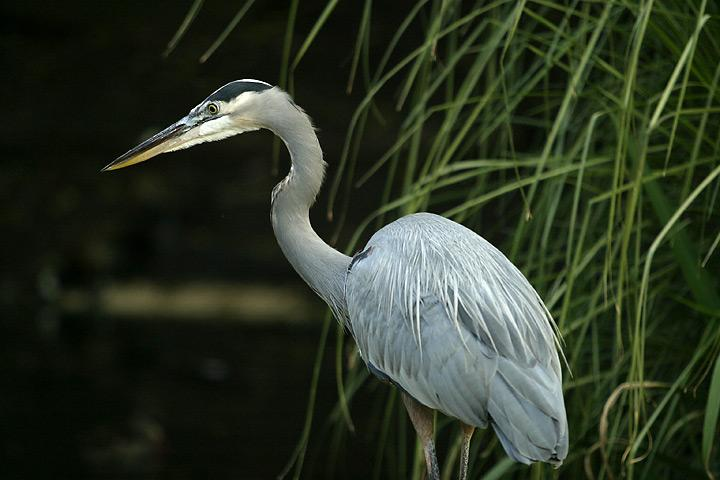
Great blue heron

Order: Pelecaniformes Family: Ardeidae

The family Ardeidae contains the herons, egrets, and bitterns. Herons and egrets are medium to large wading birds with long necks and legs. Bitterns tend to be shorter necked and more secretive. Members of Ardeidae fly with their necks retracted, unlike other long-necked birds such as storks, ibises, and spoonbills. Four species have been recorded in the park.

- American bittern, Botaurus lentiginosus; N, E, W, SP=r, S=r, F=r
- Great blue heron, Ardea herodias; N, E, W, SP=u, S=u, F=u, W=r
- Great egret, Ardea alba; W, SP=r
- Black-crowned night-heron, Nycticorax nycticorax; W, SP=a

== New World vultures ==
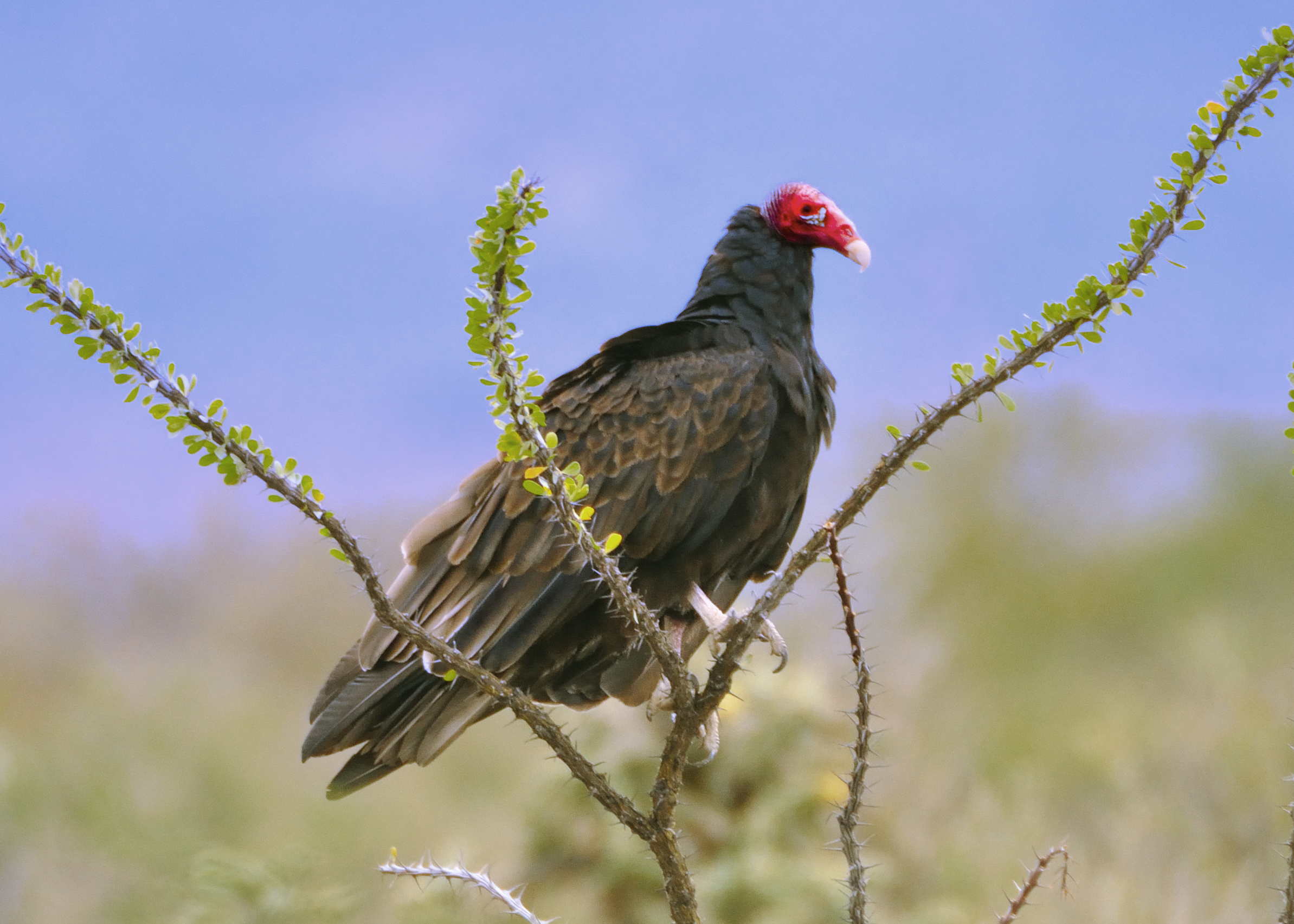
Turkey vulture

Order: Cathartiformes Family: Cathartidae

The New World vultures are not closely related to Old World vultures, but superficially resemble them because of convergent evolution. Like the Old World vultures, they are scavengers. However, unlike Old World vultures, which find carcasses by sight, New World vultures have a good sense of smell with which they locate carcasses. One species has been recorded in the park.

- Turkey vulture, Cathartes aura; E, W, SP=u, S=u, F=u

== Osprey ==
Order: Accipitriformes Family: Pandionidae

- Osprey, Pandion haliaetus; • E, W, SP=u, S=u, F=u

Pandionidae is a family of fish-eating birds of prey possessing a very large, powerful hooked beak for tearing flesh from their prey, strong legs, powerful talons, and keen eyesight. The family is monotypic.

- Osprey, Pandion haliaetus; N, E, W, SP=u, S=c, F=u

== Hawks, eagles, and kites ==
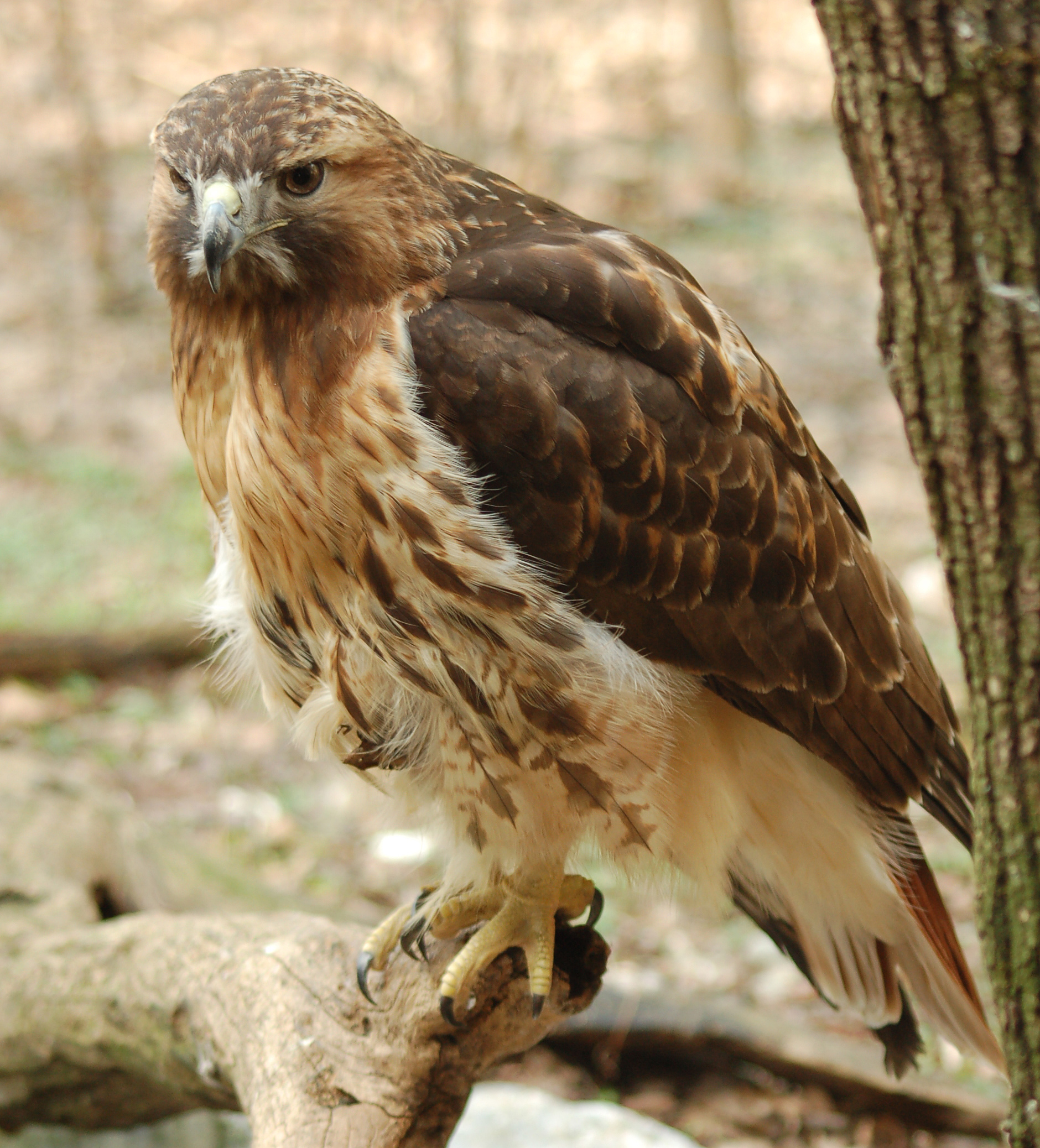
Red-tailed hawk

Order: Accipitriformes Family: Accipitridae

Accipitridae is a family of birds of prey which includes hawks, eagles, kites, harriers, and Old World vultures. These birds have very large powerful hooked beaks for tearing flesh from their prey, strong legs, powerful talons, and keen eyesight. Twelve species have been recorded in the park.

- Golden eagle, Aquila chrysaetos; N, E, W, A, SP=r, S=r, F=r, W=r
- Sharp-shinned hawk, Accipiter striatus; N, E, W, SP=u, S=u, F=u, W=r
- Cooper's hawk, Astur cooperii; N, E, W, SP=u, S=u, F=u, W=r
- American goshawk, Astur atricapillus; N, E, W, SP=u, S=u, F=u, W=r
- Northern harrier, Circus cyaneus; E, W, SP=u, S=u, F=u
- Bald eagle, Haliaeetus leucocephalus; N, E, W, SP=u, S=u, F=u, W=u
- Red-shouldered hawk, Buteo lineatus; W, F=a
- Broad-winged hawk, Buteo platypterus; E, W, SP=a, F=a
- Swainson's hawk, Buteo swainsoni; N, E, W, SP=r, S=r, F=r
- Red-tailed hawk, Buteo jamaicensis; N, E, W, SP=c, S=c, F=c
- Rough-legged hawk, Buteo lagopus; E, W, SP=r, F=r, W=r
- Ferruginous hawk, Buteo regalis; E, W, S=r

== Owls ==
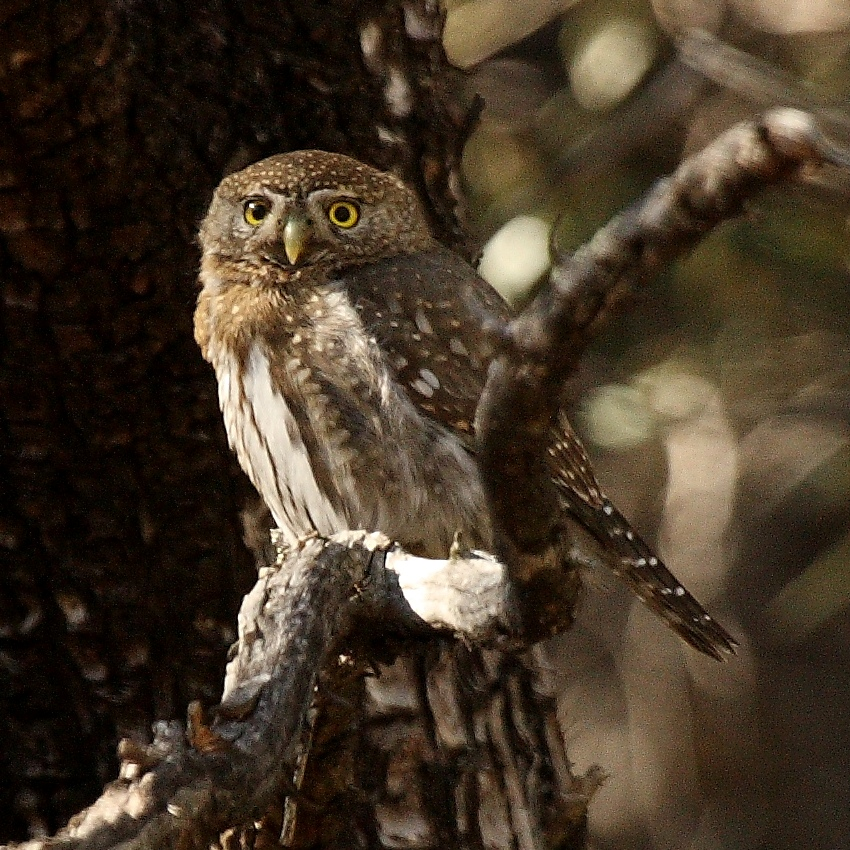
Northern pygmy-owl

Order: Strigiformes Family: Strigidae

Typical owls are small to large solitary nocturnal birds of prey. They have large forward-facing eyes and ears, a hawk-like beak, and a conspicuous circle of feathers around each eye called a facial disk. Twelve species have been recorded in the park.

- Western screech-owl, Megascops kennicottii; N, E, W, SP=r, S=r, F=r, W=r
- Great horned owl, Bubo virginianus; N, E, W, SP=u, S=u, F=u, W=u
- Snowy owl, Bubo scandiacus; E, W, F=r, W=r
- Northern hawk owl, Surnia ulula; N, E, W, SP=r, S=r, W=r
- Northern pygmy-owl, Glaucidium gnoma; N, E, W, SP=u, S=u, F=u, W=u
- Burrowing owl, Athene cunicularia; E, W, SP=a
- Barred owl, Strix varia; N, E, W, SP=u, S=u, F=u, W=u
- Great gray owl, Strix nebulosa; N, E, W, SP=r, S=r, F=r, W=r
- Long-eared owl, Asio otus; N, E, W, S=r, F=r
- Short-eared owl, Asio flammeus; E, W, S=r, F=r
- Boreal owl, Aegolius funereus; N, E, W, SP=r, S=r, F=r, W=r
- Northern saw-whet owl, Aegolius acadicus; N, E, W, SP=r, S=r, F=r, W=r

== Kingfishers ==
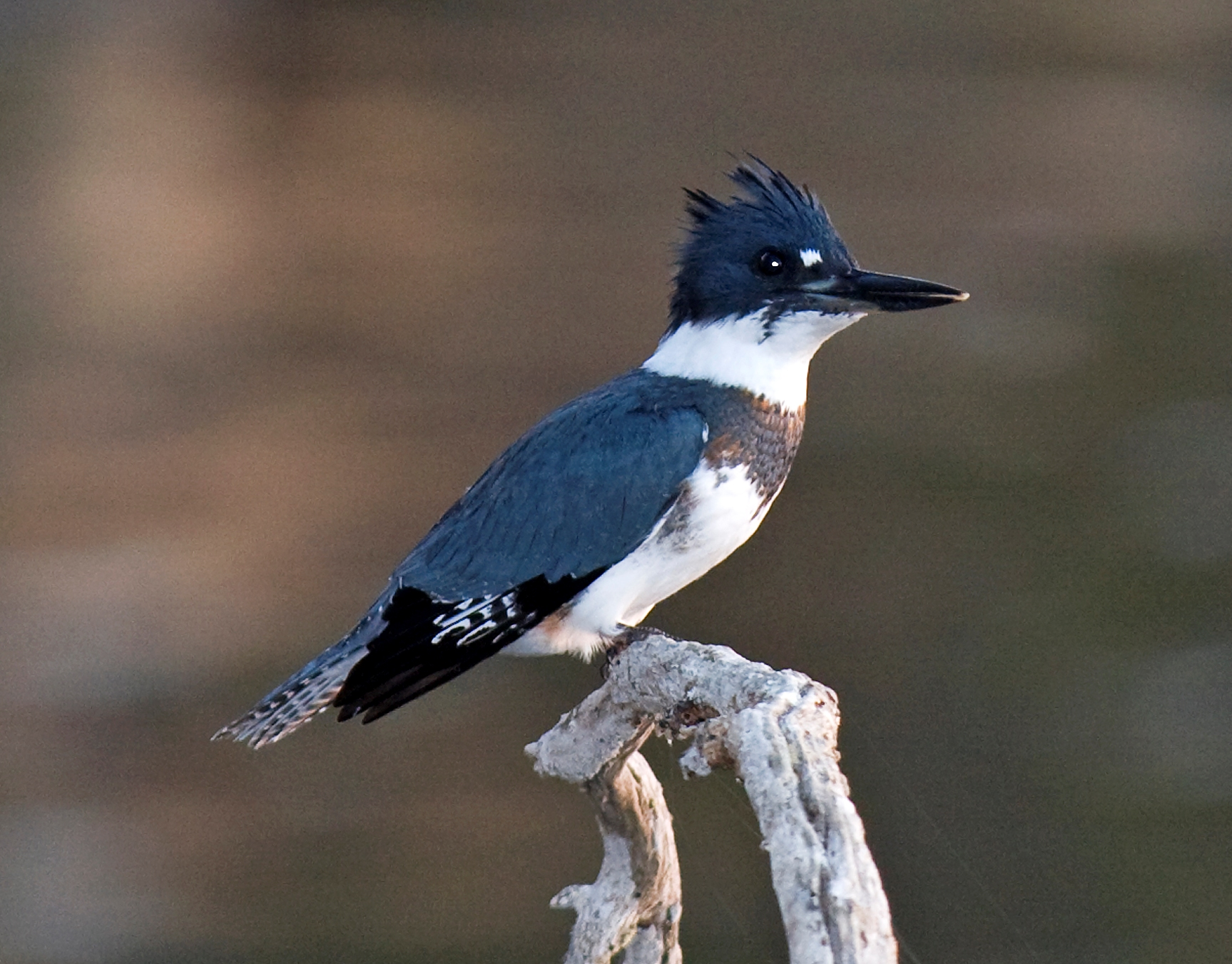
Belted kingfisher

Order: Coraciiformes Family: Alcedinidae

Kingfishers are medium-sized birds with large heads, long pointed bills, short legs, and stubby tails. One species has been recorded in the park.

- Belted kingfisher, Ceryle alcyon; N, E, W, SP=u, S=u, F=u, W=r

== Woodpeckers ==
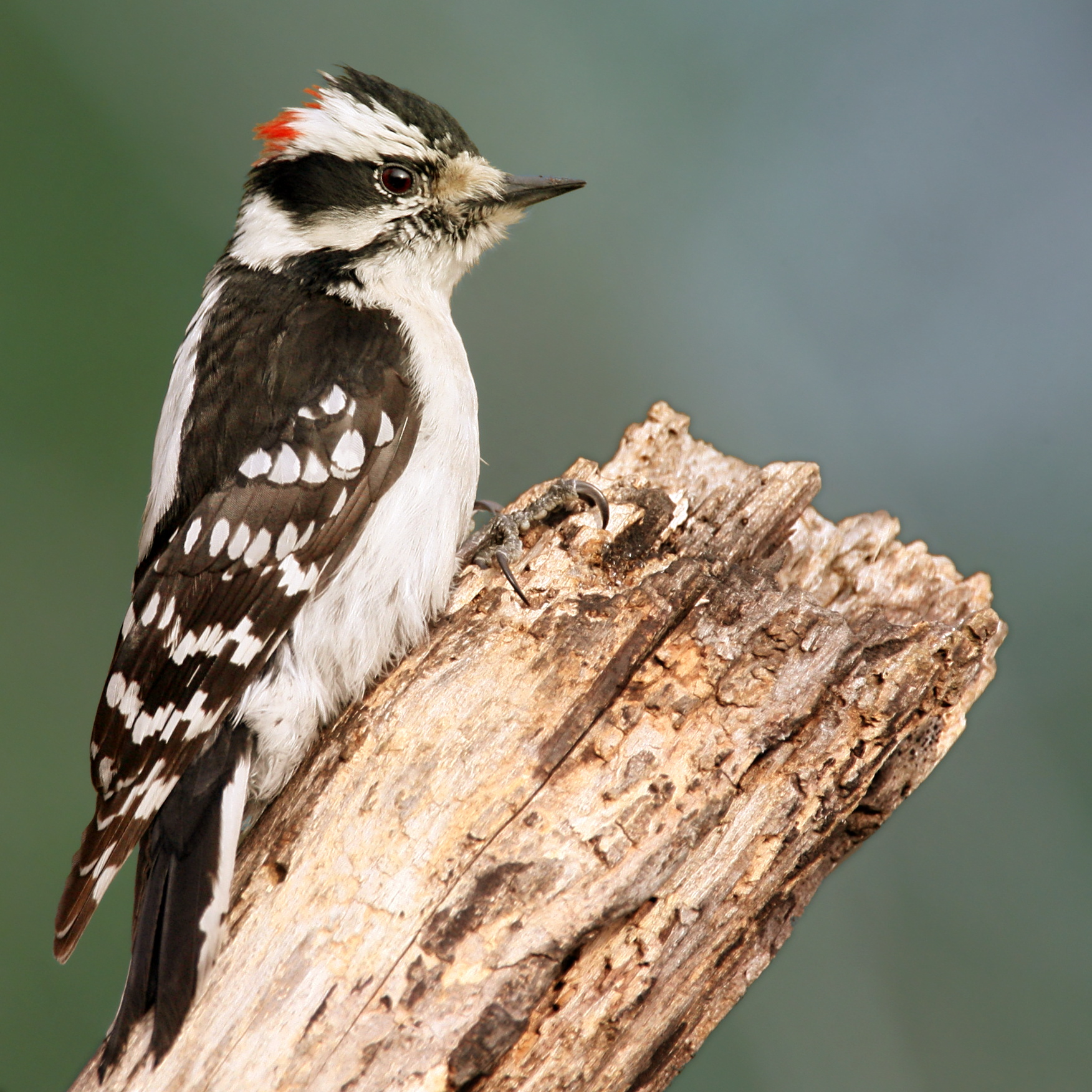
Downy woodpecker

Order: Piciformes Family: Picidae

Woodpeckers are small to medium-sized birds with chisel-like beaks, short legs, stiff tails, and long tongues used for capturing insects. Some species have feet with two toes pointing forward and two backward, while several species have only three toes. Many woodpeckers have the habit of tapping noisily on tree trunks with their beaks. Eleven species have been recorded in the park.

- Lewis's woodpecker, Melanerpes lewis; E, W, SP=u, S=u, F=r
- Red-headed woodpecker, Melanerpes erythrocephalus; E, S=a
- Williamson's sapsucker, Sphyrapicus thyroideus; N, E, W, SP=r, S=r
- Red-naped sapsucker, Sphyrapicus nuchalis; N, E, W, SP=c, S=c, F=u
- American three-toed woodpecker, Picoides dorsalis; N, E, W, SP=c, S=c, F=c, W=c
- Black-backed woodpecker, Picoides arcticus; N, E, W, SP=r, S=r, F=r, W=r
- Downy woodpecker, Dryobates pubescens; N, E, W, SP=c, S=c, F=c, W=c
- Hairy woodpecker, Dryobates villosus; N, E, W, SP=c, S=c, F=c, W=c
- White-headed woodpecker, Dryobates albolarvatus; W, F=a
- Northern flicker, Colaptes auratus; N, E, W, SP=c, S=c, F=c, W=r
- Pileated woodpecker, Dryocopus pileatus; N, E, W, SP=c, S=c, F=c, W=c

== Falcons and caracaras ==
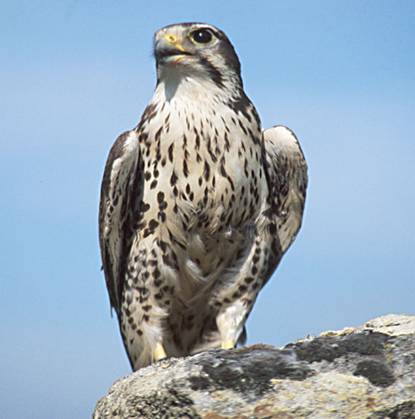
Prairie falcon

Order: Falconiformes Family: Falconidae

Falconidae is a family of diurnal birds of prey, notably the falcons and caracaras. They differ from hawks, eagles, and kites in that they kill with their beaks instead of their talons. Five species have been recorded in the park.

- American kestrel, Falco sparverius; N, E, W, SP=u, S=u, F=u
- Merlin, Falco columbarius; E, W, A, SP=r, S=r, F=r, W=r
- Gyrfalcon, Falco rusticolus; E, W, S=a F=a
- Peregrine falcon, Falco peregrinus; E, W, SP=r, S=r, F=r
- Prairie falcon, Falco mexicanus; N, E, W, A, SP=u, S=u, F=u, W=r

== Tyrant flycatchers ==
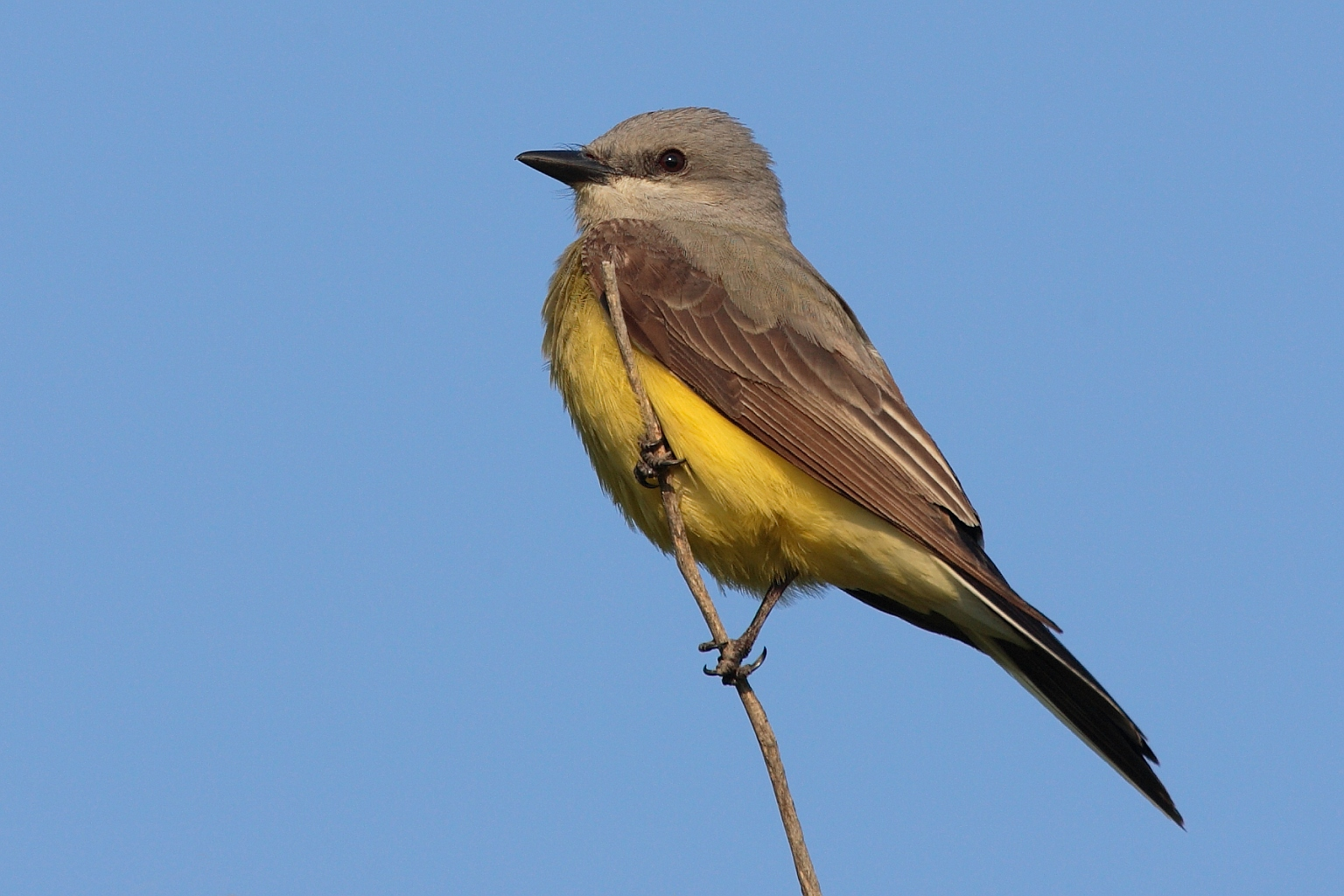
Western kingbird

Order: Passeriformes Family: Tyrannidae

Tyrant flycatchers are Passerine birds which occur throughout North and South America. They superficially resemble the Old World flycatchers, but are more robust and have stronger bills. They do not have the sophisticated vocal capabilities of the songbirds. Most, but not all, are rather plain. As the name implies, most are insectivorous. Thirteen species have been recorded in the park.

- Western kingbird, Tyrannus verticalis; E, W, SP=r, S=r
- Eastern kingbird, Tyrannus tyrannus; N, E, W, SP=u, S=u
- Scissor-tailed flycatcher, Tyrannus forficatus; W, S=a
- Olive-sided flycatcher, Contopus cooperi; N, E, W, SP=c, S=c
- Western wood-pewee, Contopus sordidulus; N, E, W, SP=u, S=u
- Alder flycatcher, Empidonax alnorum; E, W, SP=r, S=r
- Willow flycatcher, Empidonax traillii; N, E, W, SP=u, S=u
- Least flycatcher, Empidonax minimus; N, E, W, SP=r, S=r
- Hammond's flycatcher, Empidonax hammondii; N, E, W, SP=c, S=c
- Dusky flycatcher, Empidonax oberholseri; N, E, W, SP=c, S=c
- Western flycatcher, Empidonax difficilis; E, W, SP=r, S=r
- Say's phoebe, Sayornis saya; E, W, S=r, F=r
- Ash-throated flycatcher, Myiarchus cinerascens; W, F=a

== Vireos, shrike-babblers, and erpornis ==
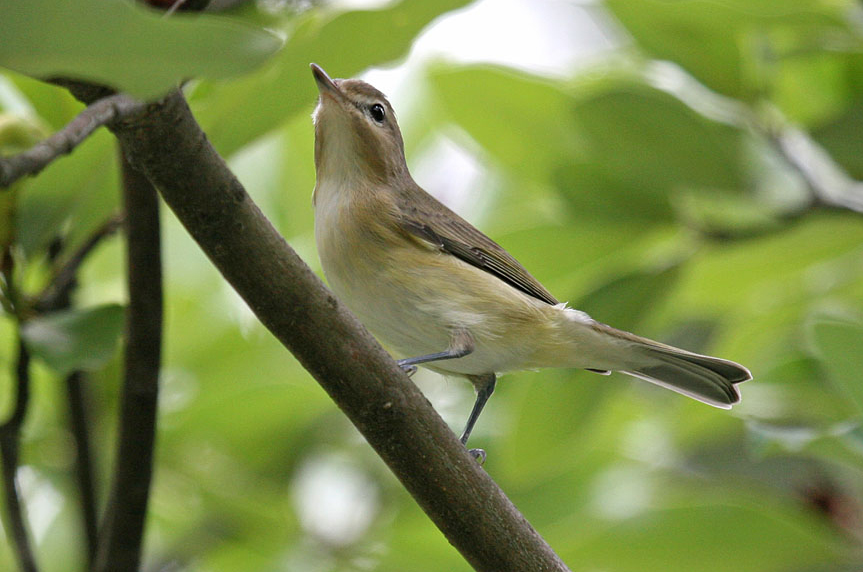
Warbling vireo

Order: Passeriformes Family: Vireonidae

The vireos are a group of small to medium-sized passerine birds restricted to the New World. They are typically greenish in color and resemble wood warblers apart from their heavier bills. Three species have been recorded in the park.

- Cassin's vireo, Vireo cassinii; N, E, W, SP=u, S=u
- Warbling vireo, Vireo gilvus; N, E, W, SP=ab, S=ab
- Red-eyed vireo, Vireo olivaceus; N, E, W, SP=u, S=u

== Shrikes ==
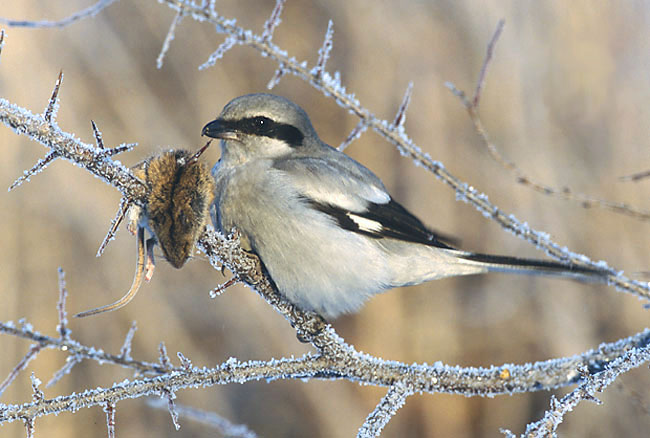
Northern shrike

Order: Passeriformes Family: Laniidae

Shrikes are passerine birds known for their habit of catching other birds and small animals and impaling the uneaten portions of their bodies on thorns. A shrike's beak is hooked, like that of a typical bird of prey. Two species have been recorded in the park.

- Loggerhead shrike, Lanius ludovicianus; E, W, SP=a F=a, W=a
- Northern shrike, Lanius excubitor; E, W, SP=r, F=r, W=r

== Crows, jays, and magpies ==
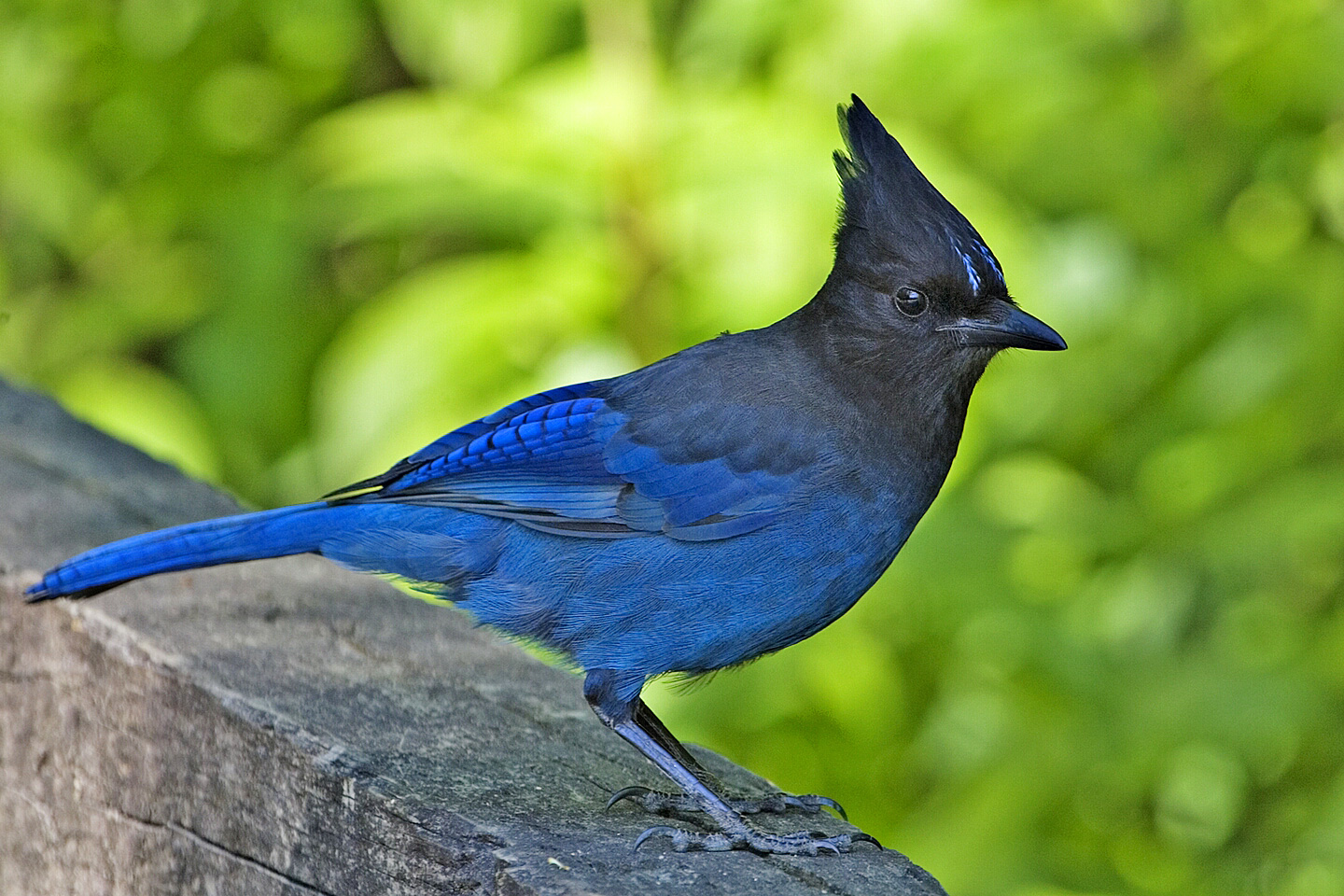
Steller's jay

Order: Passeriformes Family: Corvidae

The family Corvidae includes crows, ravens, jays, choughs, magpies, treepies, nutcrackers, and ground jays. Corvids are above average in size among the Passeriformes, and some of the larger species show high levels of intelligence. Seven species have been recorded in the park.

- Canada jay, Perisoreus canadensis; N, E, W, SP=c, S=c, F=c, W=c
- Steller's jay, Cyanocitta stelleri; N, E, W, SP=c, S=c, F=c, W=c
- Blue jay, Cyanocitta cristata; E, W, SP=r, S=r, F=r. W=r
- Clark's nutcracker, Nucifraga columbiana; N, E, W, A, SP=u, S=u, F=u, W=u
- Black-billed magpie, Pica hudsonia; N, E, W, SP=u, S=u, F=u, W=u
- American crow, Corvus brachyrhynchos; N, E, W, SP=u, S=u, F=u, W=r
- Common raven, Corvus corax; N, E, W, A, SP=c, S=c, F=c, W=c

== Tits, chickadees, and titmice ==
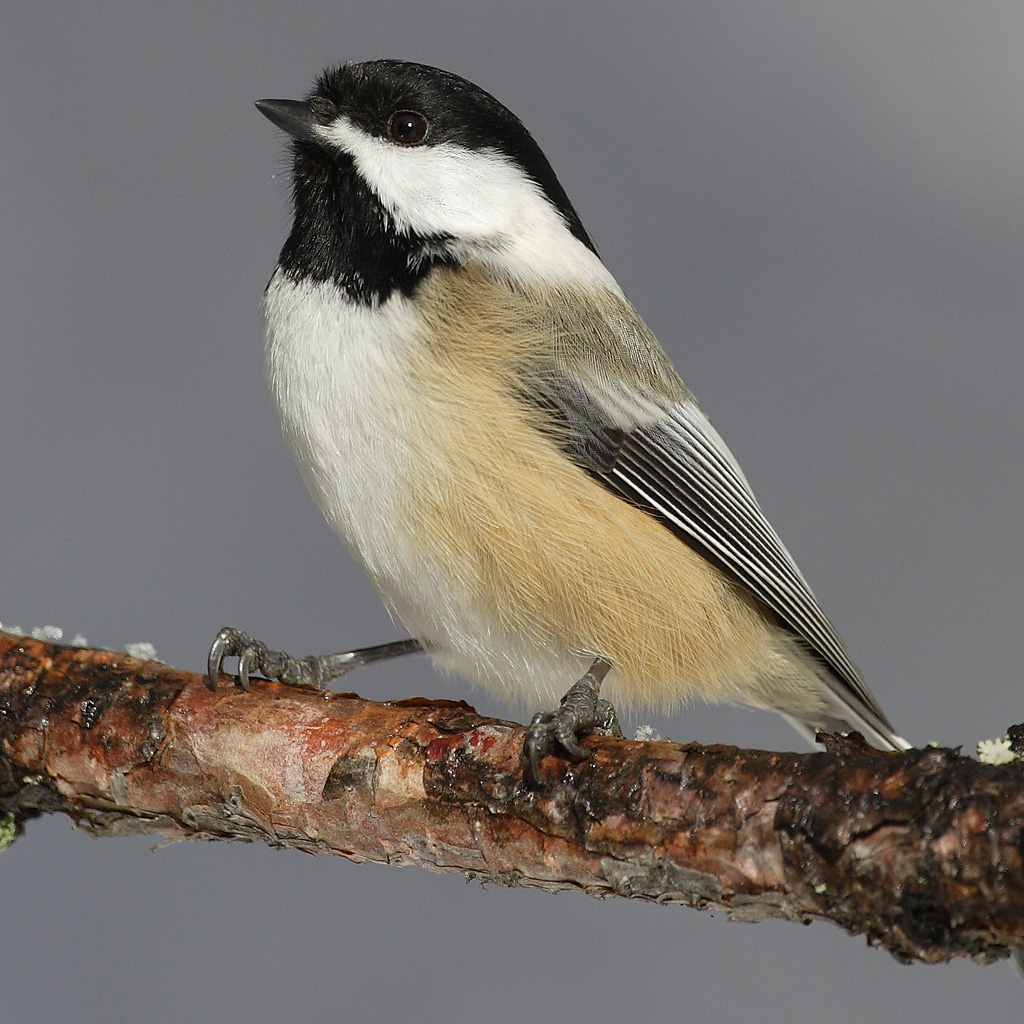
Black-capped chickadee

Order: Passeriformes Family: Paridae

The Paridae are mainly small stocky woodland species with short stout bills. Some have crests. They are adaptable birds, with a mixed diet including seeds and insects. Four species have been recorded in the park.

- Black-capped chickadee, Poecile atricapilla; N, E, W, SP=c, S=c, F=c, W=c
- Mountain chickadee, Poecile gambeli; N, E, W, SP=c, S=c, F=c, W=c
- Chestnut-backed chickadee, Poecile rufescens; N, E, W, SP=u, S=u, F=u, W=u
- Boreal chickadee, Poecile hudsonica; N, E, W, SP=u, S=u, F=u, W=u

== Larks ==
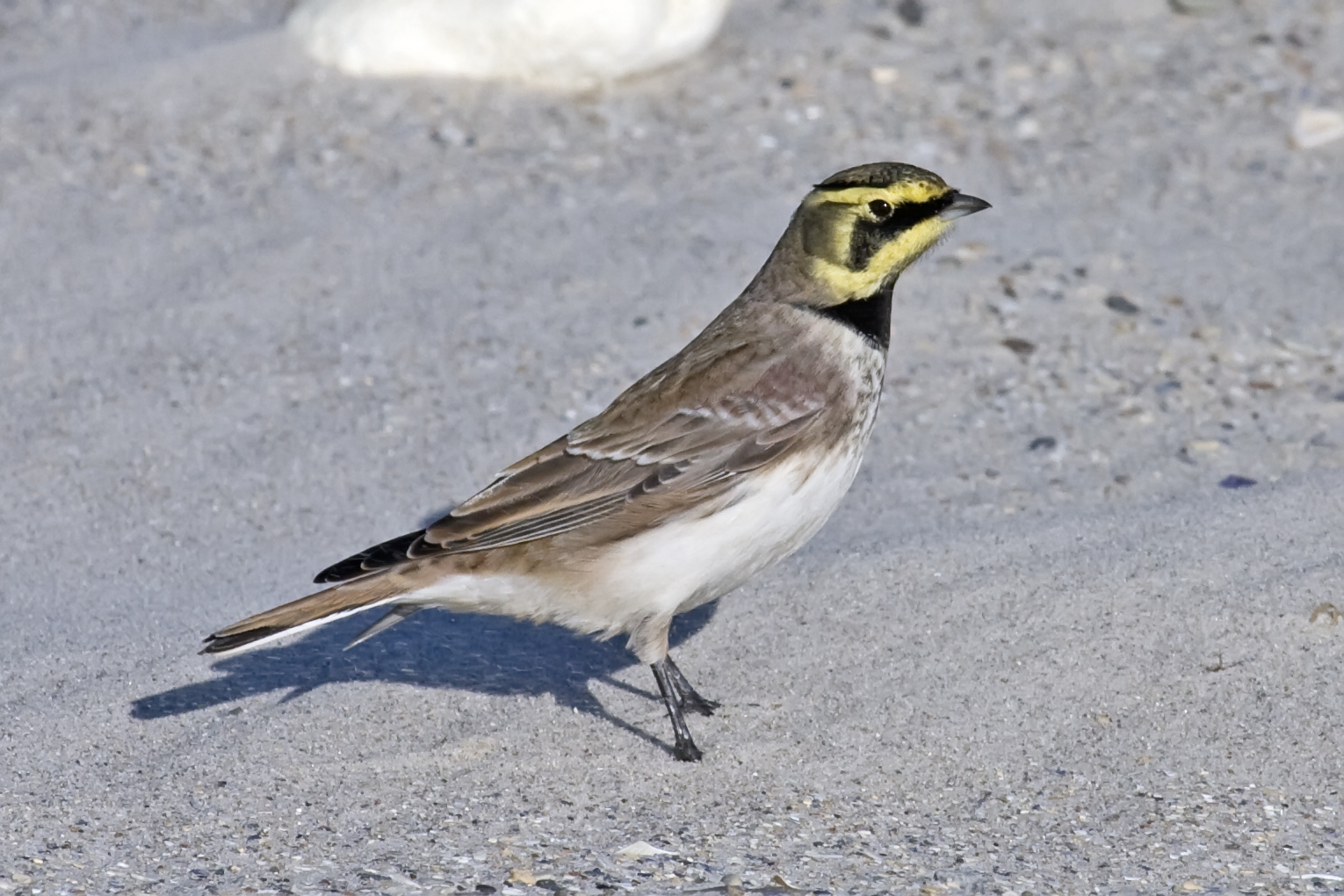
Horned lark

Order: Passeriformes Family: Alaudidae

Larks are small terrestrial birds with often extravagant songs and display flights. Most larks are fairly dull in appearance. Their food is insects and seeds. One species has been recorded in the park.

- Horned lark, Eremophila alpestris; E, W, A, SP=r, S=r, F=r, W=r

== Swallows ==
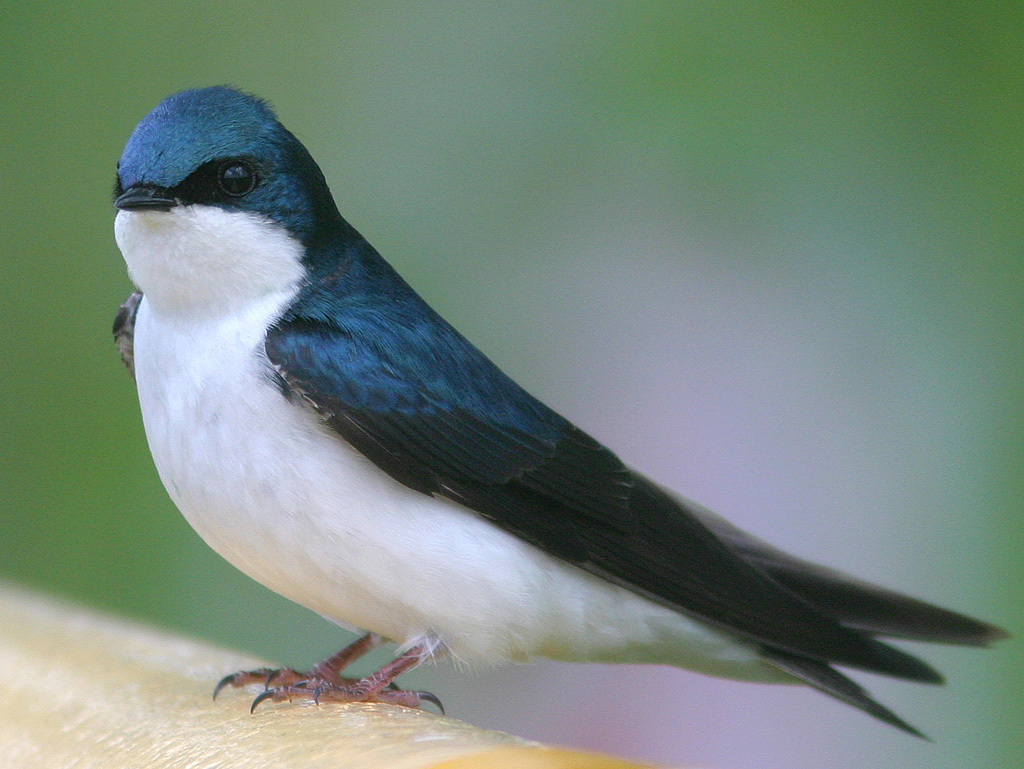
Tree swallow

Order: Passeriformes Family: Hirundinidae

The family Hirundinidae is a group of passerines characterized by their adaptation to aerial feeding. These adaptations include a slender streamlined body, long pointed wings, and short bills with a wide gape. The feet are adapted to perching rather than walking, and the front toes are partially joined at the base. Six species have been recorded in the park.

- Bank swallow, Riparia riparia; N, E, W, SP=u, S=u, F=u
- Tree swallow, Tachycineta bicolor; N, E, W, SP=ab, S=ab, F=u
- Violet-green swallow, Tachycineta thalassina; N, E, W, A, SP=c, S=c, F=u
- Northern rough-winged swallow, Stelgidopteryx serripennis; N, E, W, SP=u, S=u, F=u
- Barn swallow, Hirundo rustica; N, E, W, SP=c, S=c, F=u
- Cliff swallow, Petrochelidon pyrrhonota; N, E, W, A, SP=c, S=c, F=u

== Kinglets ==
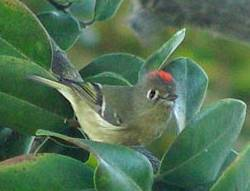
Ruby-crowned kinglet

Order: Passeriformes Family: Regulidae

The kinglets are a small family of birds which resemble the titmice. They are very small insectivorous birds, mostly in the genus Regulus. The adults have colored crowns, giving rise to their names. Two species have been recorded in the park.

- Ruby-crowned kinglet, Corthylio calendula; N, E, W, SP=ab, S=ab, F=c
- Golden-crowned kinglet, Regulus satrapa; N, E, W, SP=c, S=c, F=c, W=c

== Waxwings ==
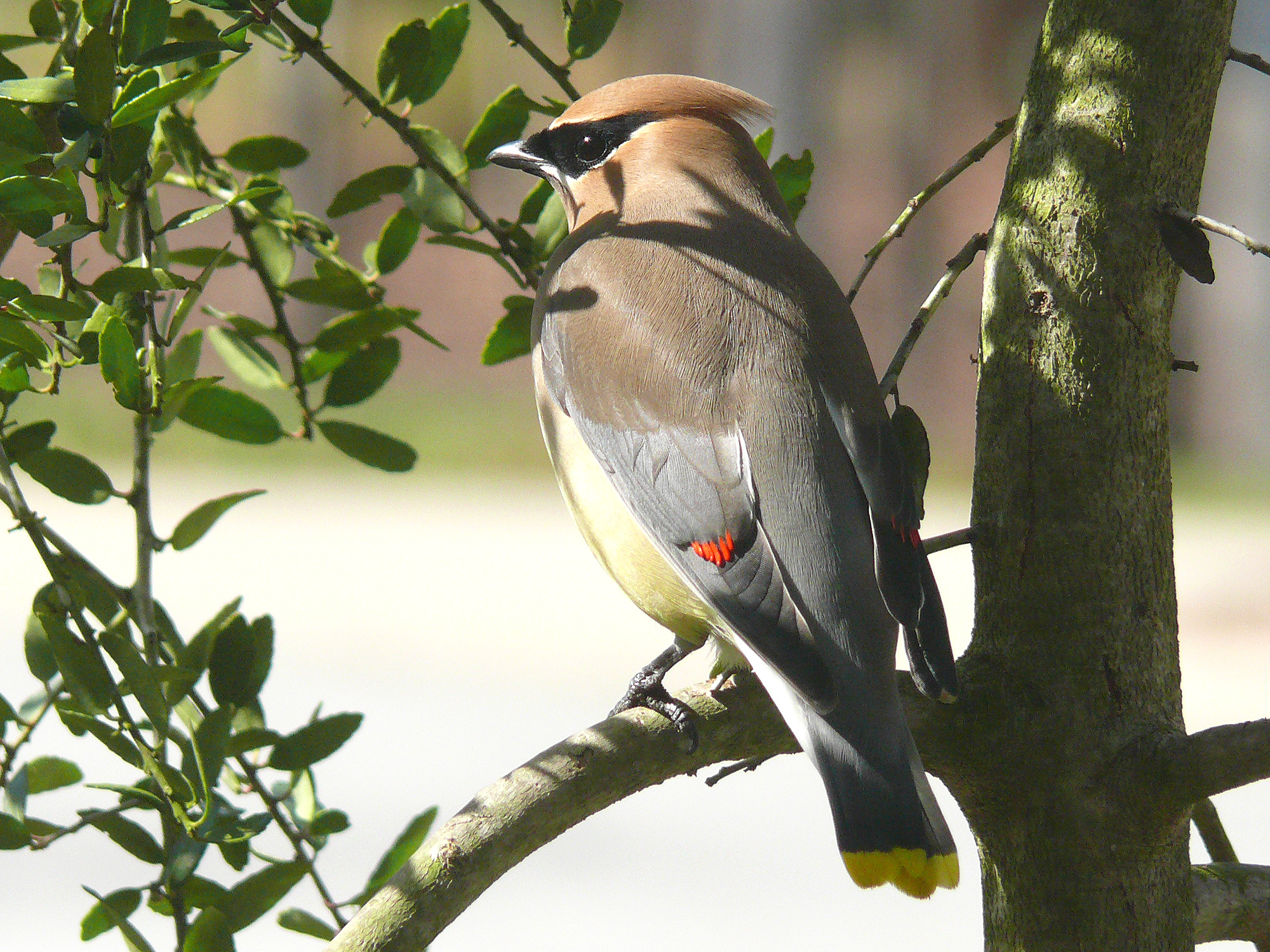
Cedar waxwing

Order: Passeriformes Family: Bombycillidae

The waxwings are a group of passerine birds with soft silky plumage and unique red tips to some of the wing feathers. In the Bohemian and cedar waxwings, these tips look like sealing wax and give the group its name. These are arboreal birds of northern forests. They live on insects in summer and berries in winter. Two species have been recorded in the park.

- Bohemian waxwing, Bombycilla garrulus; E, W, SP=r, F=r, W=u
- Cedar waxwing, Bombycilla cedrorum; N, E, W, SP=c, S=c, F=c

== Nuthatches ==
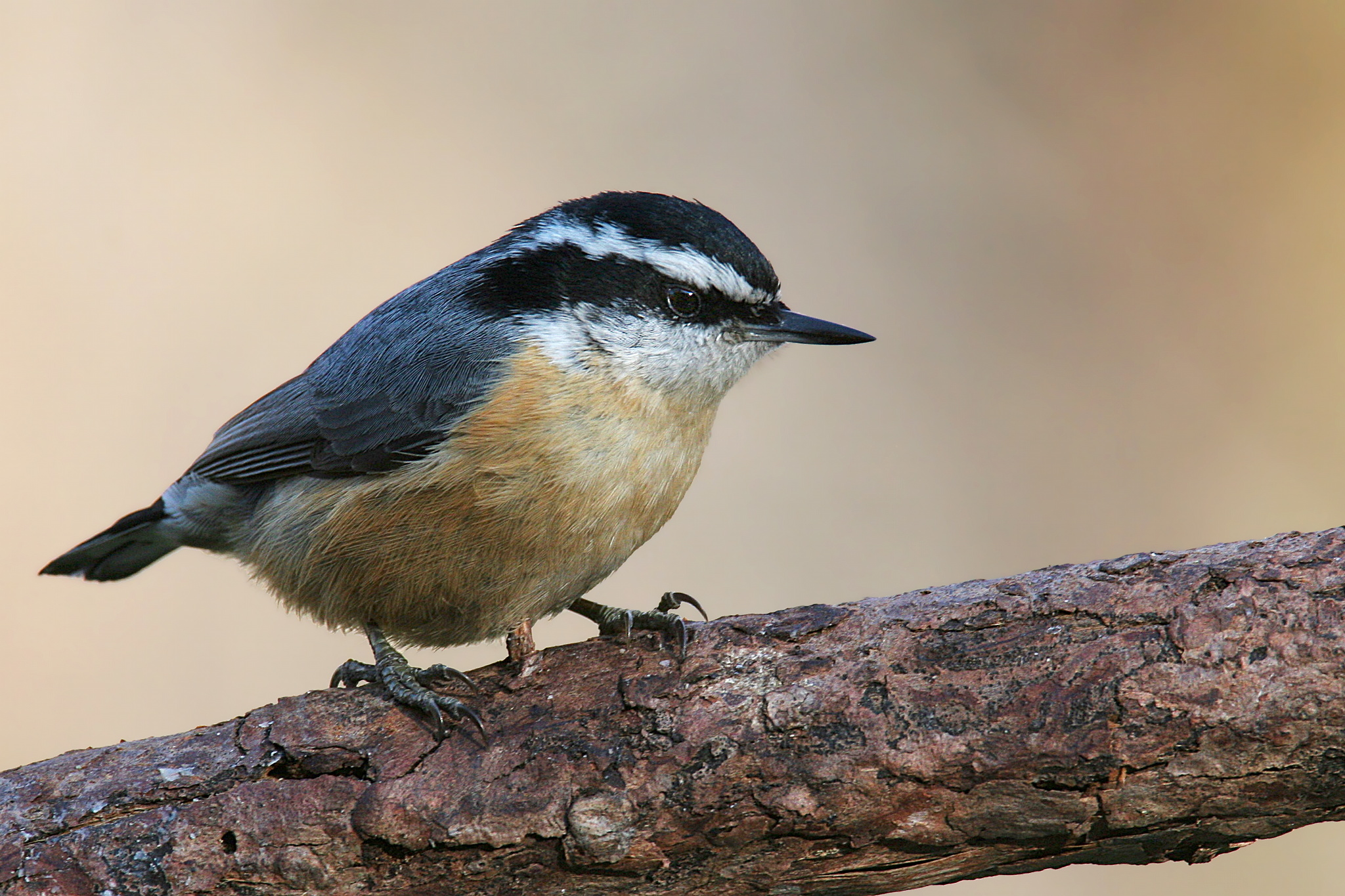
Red-breasted nuthatch

Order: Passeriformes Family: Sittidae

Nuthatches are small woodland birds. They have the unusual ability to climb down trees head first, unlike other birds which can only go upwards. Nuthatches have big heads, short tails, and powerful bills and feet. Two species have been recorded in the park.

- Red-breasted nuthatch, Sitta canadensis, N, E, W, SP=c, S=c, F=c, W=c
- White-breasted nuthatch, Sitta carolinensis, N, E, W, SP=r, S=r, F=r, W=r

== Treecreepers ==
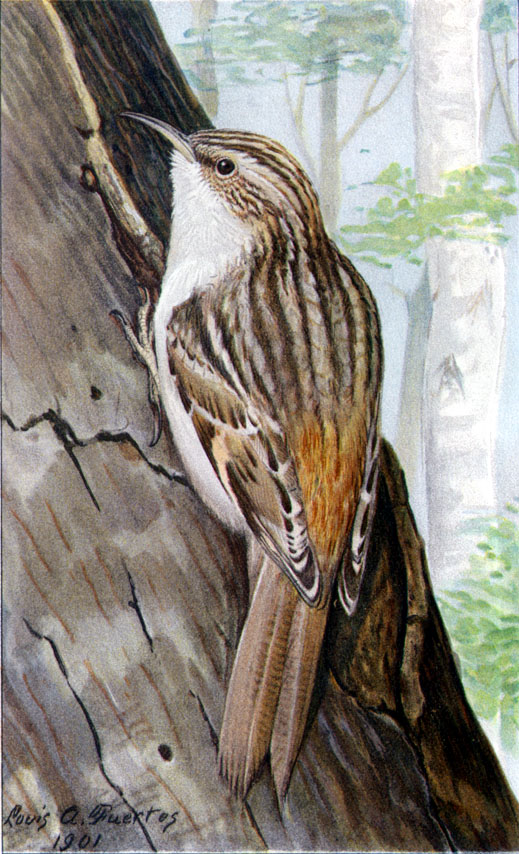
Brown creeper

Order: Passeriformes Family: Certhiidae

Treecreepers are small woodland birds, brown above and white below. They have thin pointed down-curved bills, which they use to extricate insects from bark. They have stiff tail feathers, like woodpeckers, which they use to support themselves on vertical trees. One species has been recorded in the park.

- Brown creeper, Certhia americana, N, E, W, SP=u, S=u, F=u, W=u

== Wrens ==
Order: Passeriformes Family: Troglodytidae

Wrens are small and inconspicuous birds, except for their loud songs. They have short wings and thin down-turned bills. Several species often hold their tails upright. All are insectivorous. Four species have been recorded in the park.

- Rock wren, Salpinctes obsoletus; N, E, W, A, SP=u, S=u, F=u
- Northern house wren, Troglodytes aedon; N, E, W, SP=u, S=u
- Pacific wren, Troglodytes pacificus; N, E, W, SP=c, S=c, F=u, W=r
- Marsh wren, Cistothorus palustris; W, SP=a

== Mockingbirds and thrashers ==
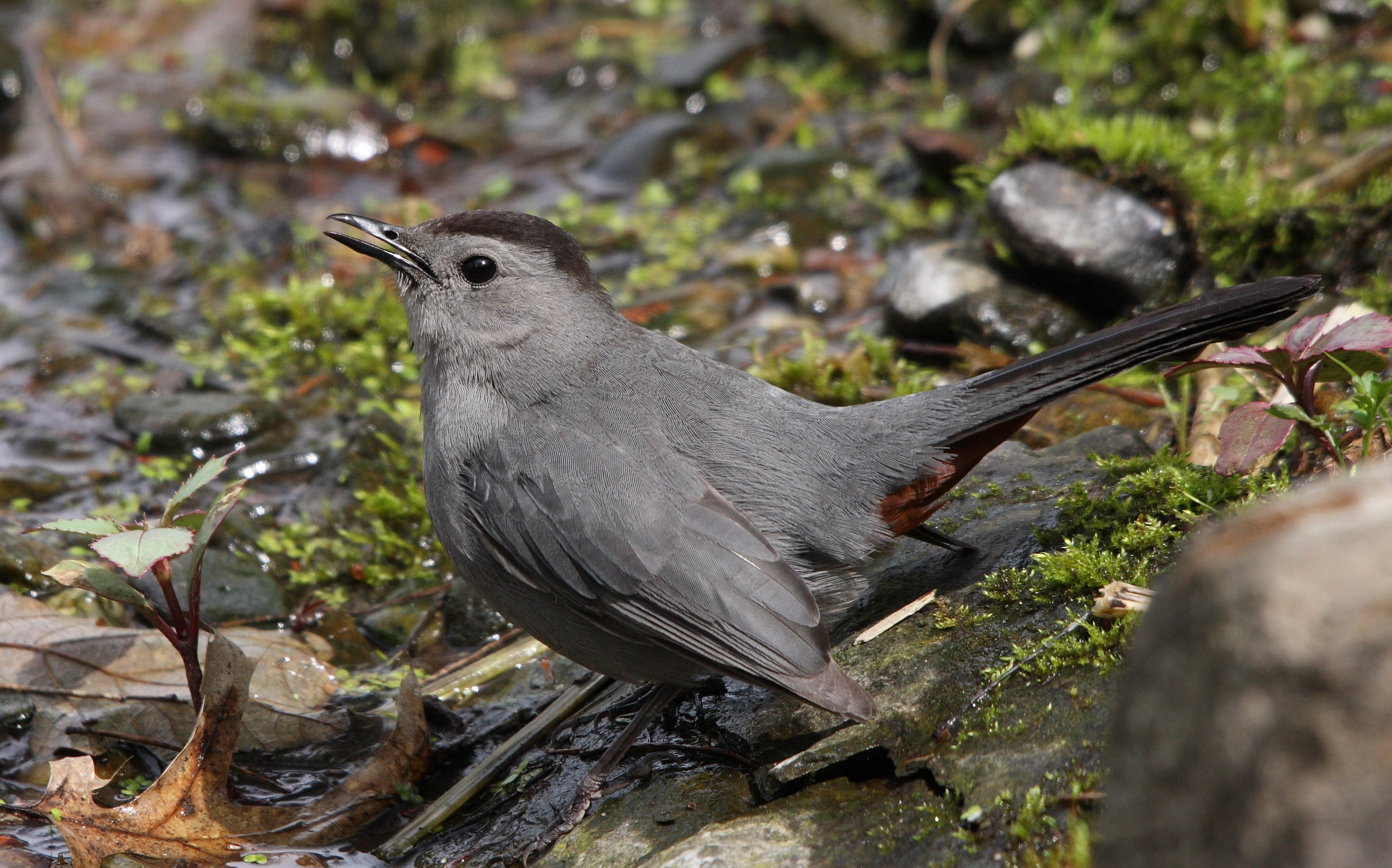
Gray catbird

Order: Passeriformes Family: Mimidae

The mimids are a family of passerine birds which includes thrashers, mockingbirds, tremblers, and the New World catbirds. These birds are notable for their vocalization, especially their remarkable ability to mimic a wide variety of birds and other sounds heard outdoors. The species tend towards dull grays and browns in their appearance. Three species have been recorded in the park.

- Gray catbird, Dumetella carolinensis; N, E, W, SP=u, S=u, F=u
- Sage thrasher, Oreoscoptes montanus; W, SP=a
- Northern mockingbird, Mimus polyglottos; W, S=a

== Starlings ==
Order: Passeriformes Family: Sturnidae

Starlings are small to medium-sized passerine birds with strong feet. Their flight is strong and direct and they are very gregarious. Their preferred habitat is fairly open country, and they eat insects and fruit. Plumage is typically dark with a metallic sheen. One species has been recorded in the park.

- European starling, Sturnus vulgaris, N, E, W, I, SP=u, S=u, F=u, W=r

== Dippers ==
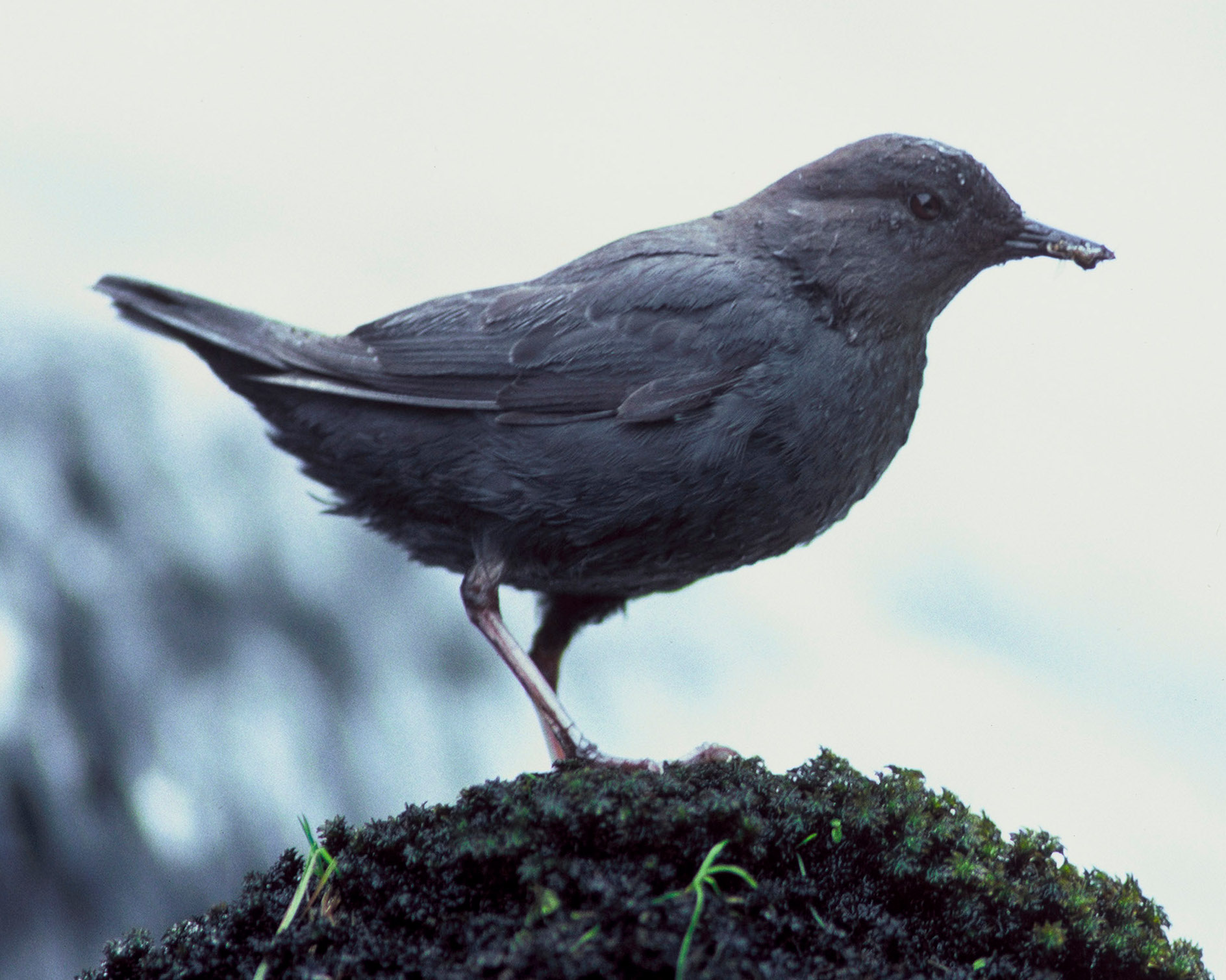
American dipper

Order: Passeriformes Family: Cinclidae

Dippers are small, stout, birds that feed in cold, fast moving streams. One species has been recorded in the park.

- American dipper, Cinclus mexicanus, N, E, W, SP=c, S=c, F=c, W=u

== Thrushes and allies ==
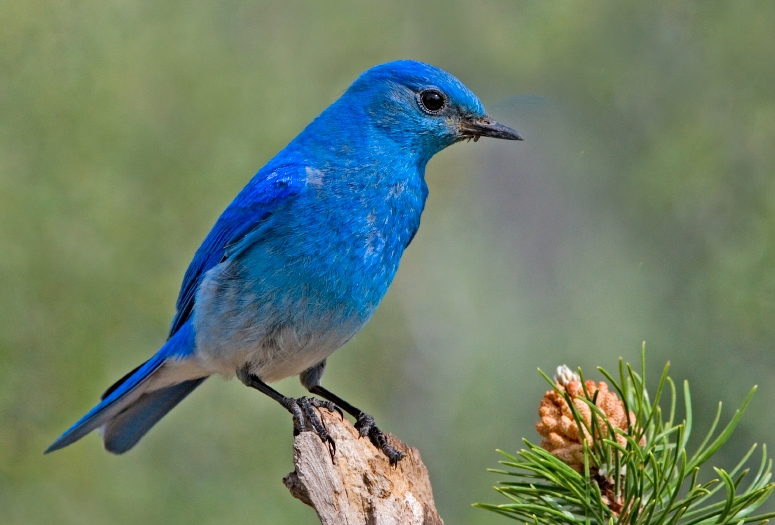
Mountain bluebird

Order: Passeriformes Family: Turdidae

The thrushes are a group of passerine birds that occur mainly but not exclusively in the Old World. They are plump, soft plumaged, small to medium-sized insectivores or sometimes omnivores, often feeding on the ground. Many have attractive songs. Nine species have been recorded in the park.

- Eastern bluebird, Sialia sialis; E, SP=a
- Western bluebird, Sialia mexicana; E, W, S=r
- Mountain bluebird, Sialia currucoides; N, E, W, A SP=c, S=c, F=c
- Townsend's solitaire, Myadestes townsendi; N, E, W, A, SP=c, S=c, F=c, W=u
- Veery, Catharus fuscescens; N, E, W, SP=r, S=r, F=r
- Swainson's thrush, Catharus ustulatus; N, E, W, SP=ab, S=ab, F=c
- Hermit thrush, Catharus guttatus; N, E, W, A, SP=c, S=c, F=c
- American robin, Turdus migratorius; N, E, W, SP=ab, S=ab, F=c, W=r
- Varied thrush, Ixoreus naevius; N, E, W, SP=c, S=c, F=c, W=r

== Wagtails and pipits ==
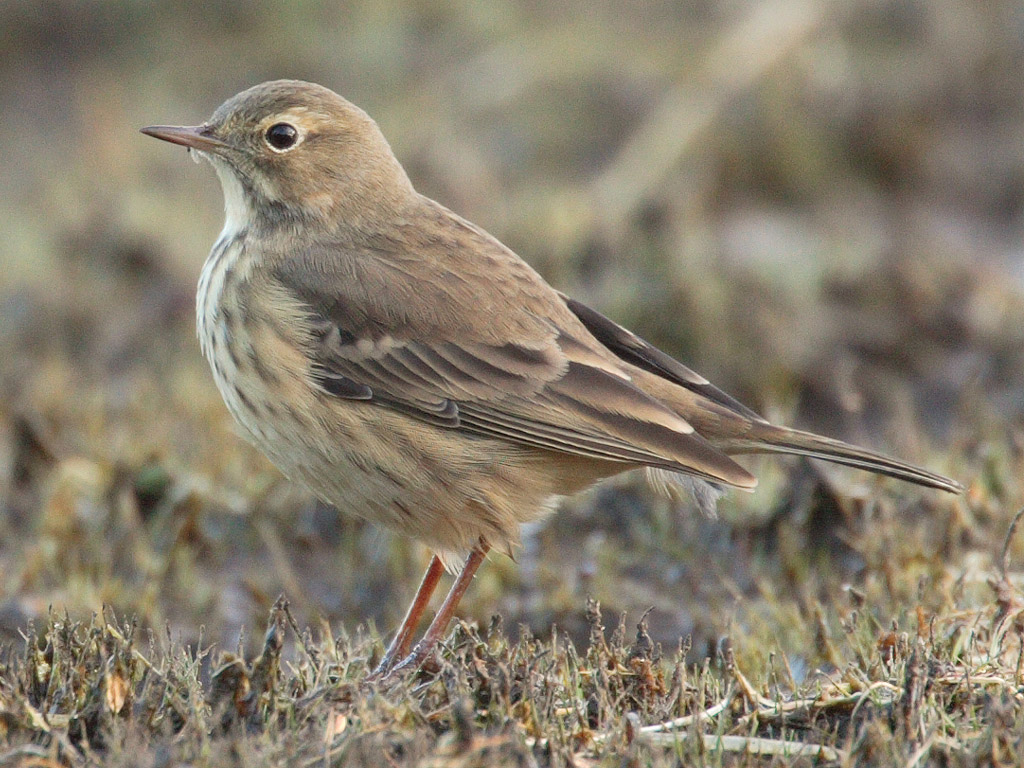
American pipit

Order: Passeriformes Family: Motacillidae

Motacillidae is a family of small passerine birds with medium to long tails. They include the wagtails, longclaws, and pipits. They are slender ground-feeding insectivores of open country. One species has been recorded in the park.

- American pipit, Anthus rubescens; N, E, W, A, SP=u, S=u, F=u

== Finches, euphonias, and allies ==
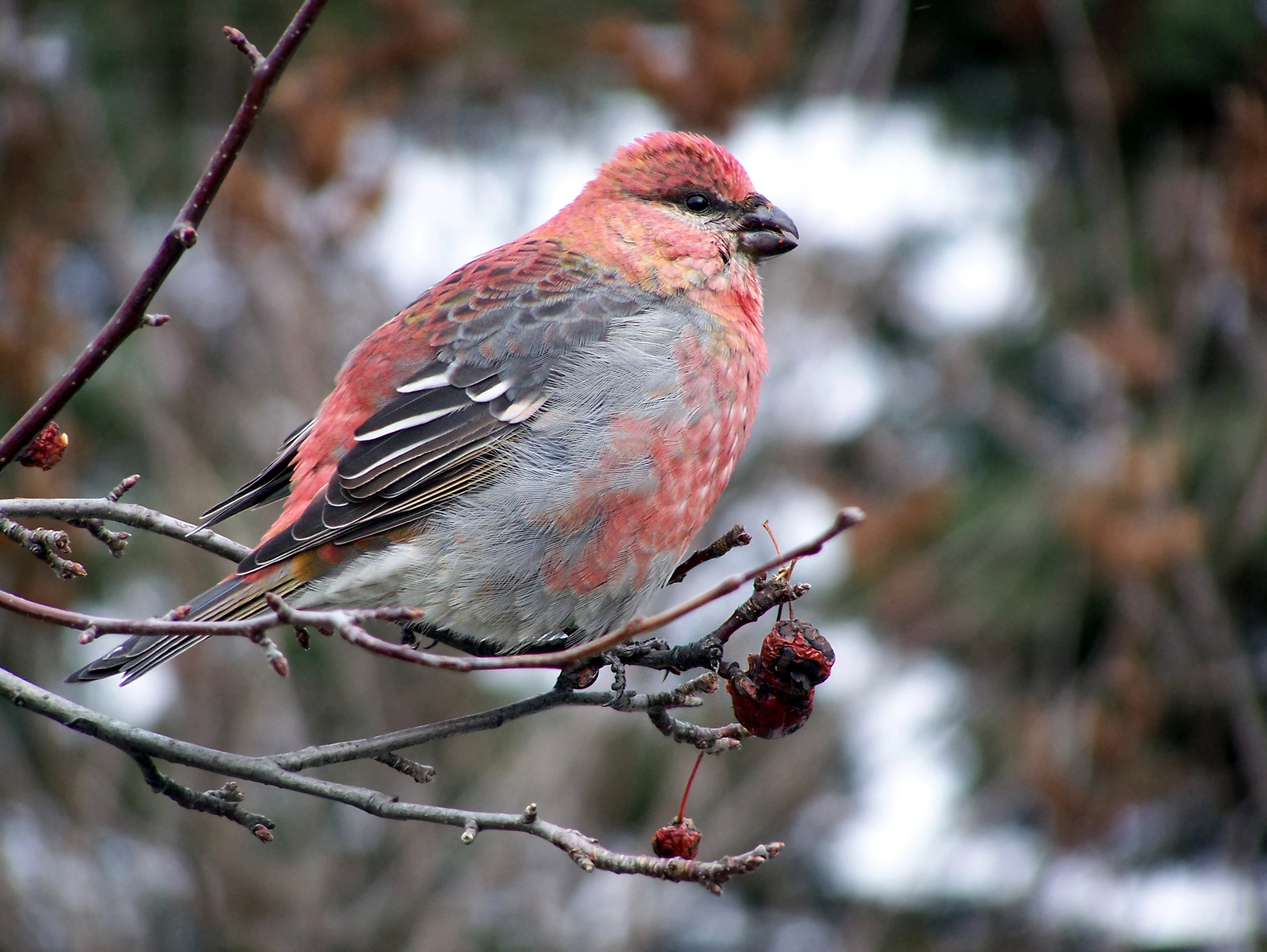
Pine grosbeak

Order: Passeriformes Family: Fringillidae

Finches are seed-eating passerine birds that are small to moderately large and have a strong beak, usually conical and in some species very large. All have twelve tail feathers and nine primaries. These birds have a bouncing flight with alternating bouts of flapping and gliding on closed wings, and most sing well. Ten species have been recorded in the park.

- Evening grosbeak, Coccothraustes vespertinus; N, E, W, SP=c, S=c, F=c, W=c
- Pine grosbeak, Pinicola enucleator, N, E, W, SP=u, S=u, F=u, W=u
- Gray-crowned rosy-finch, Leucosticte tephrocotis; N, E, W, A, SP=u, S=u, F=u, W=u
- Cassin's finch, Haemorhous cassinii; N, E, W, SP=u, S=u, F=u
- House finch, Haemorhous mexicanus; W, S=r, W=r
- Redpoll, Acanthis flammea; E, W, SP=u, F=u, W=u
- Red crossbill, Loxia curvirostra; N, E, W, SP=c, S=c, F=c, W=c
- White-winged crossbill, Loxia leucoptera; N, E, W, SP=u, S=u, F=u, W=u
- Pine siskin, Spinus pinus; N, E, W, A, SP=c, S=c, F=c, W=u
- American goldfinch, Spinus tristis; E, W, SP=r, S=r, F=r

== Longspurs and snow buntings ==
Order: Passeriformes Family: Calcariidae

The Calcariidae are a group of passerine birds that were traditionally grouped with the New World sparrows, but differ in a number of respects and are usually found in open grassy areas. Four species have been recorded in the park.

- Lapland longspur, Calcarius lapponicus; E, W, A, SP=r, S=r, F=r
- Chestnut-collared longspur, Calcarius ornatus; E, W, SP=r
- Thick-billed longspur, Rhynchophanes mccownii; E, W, SP=r, F=r
- Snow bunting, Plectrophenax nivalis; E, W, SP=u, F=u, W=u

== New World sparrows ==
Order: Passeriformes Family: Passerellidae

Until 2017, these species were considered part of the family Emberizidae. Most of the species are known as sparrows, but these birds are not closely related to the Old World sparrows which are in the family Passeridae. Many of these have distinctive head patterns. Eighteen species have been recorded in the park.

- Lark sparrow, Chondestes grammacus; W, SP=r
- Lark bunting, Calamospiza melanocorys; E, W, SP=a, S=a
- Chipping sparrow, Spizella passerina; N, E, W, SP=c, S=ab, F=u
- Clay-colored sparrow, Spizella pallida; N, E, W, SP=u, S=u
- Brewer's sparrow, Spizella breweri; N, E, W, SP=u, S=u
- Fox sparrow, Passerella iliaca; N, E, W, SP=c, S=c, F=u
- American tree sparrow, Spizelloides arborea; E, W, SP=r F=r, W=r
- Dark-eyed junco, Junco hyemalis; N, E, W, SP=c, S=ab, F=c, W=u
- White-crowned sparrow, Zonotrichia leucophrys; N, E, W, A, SP=c, S=ab, F=c
- Harris's sparrow, Zonotrichia querula; E, W, SP=r, F=r
- White-throated sparrow, Zonotrichia albicollis; E, W, SP=r, S=r, F=r, W=r
- Vesper sparrow, Pooecetes gramineus; N, E, W, SP=u, S=u, F=u
- LeConte's sparrow, Ammospiza leconteii; N, E, W, SP=r, S=r
- Savannah sparrow, Passerculus sandwichensis; N, E, W, SP=c, S=c
- Song sparrow, Melospiza melodia; N, E, W, SP=u, S=u, F=u, W=r
- Lincoln's sparrow, Melospiza lincolnii; N, E, W, SP=u, S=u, F=u
- Green-tailed towhee, Pipilo chlorurus; E, F=a
- Spotted towhee, Pipilo maculatus; E, W, SP=u, S=u

== Yellow-breasted chat ==
Order: Passeriformes Family: Icteriidae

This species was historically placed in the wood-warblers (Parulidae) but nonetheless most authorities were unsure if it belonged there. It was placed in its own family in 2017.

- Yellow-breasted chat, Icteria virens; W, SP=a, S=a

== Troupials and allies ==
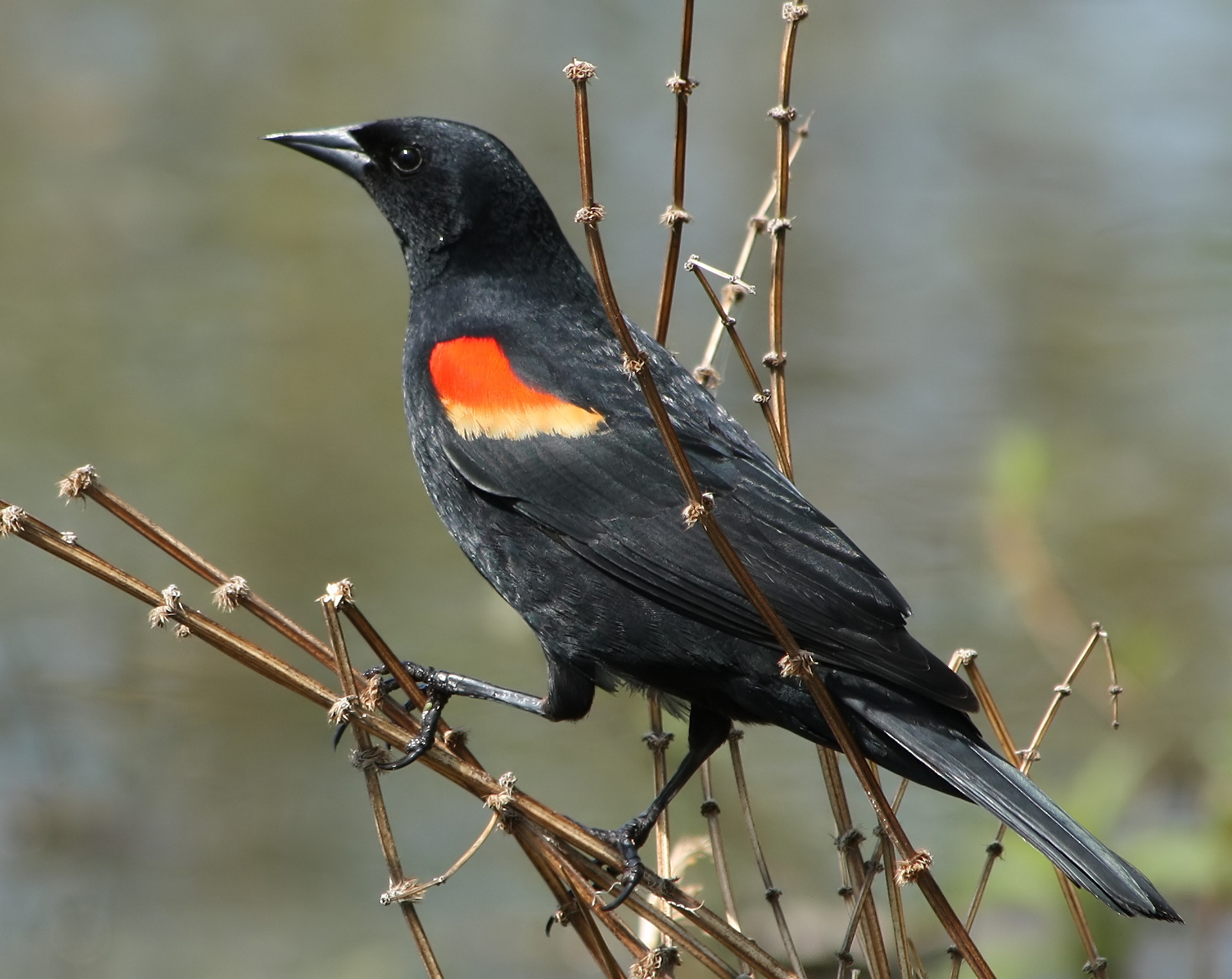
Red-winged blackbird

Order: Passeriformes Family: Icteridae

The icterids are a group of small to medium-sized, often colorful passerine birds restricted to the New World and include the grackles, New World blackbirds, and New World orioles. Most species have black as a predominant plumage color, often enlivened by yellow, orange or red. Nine species have been recorded in the park.

- Yellow-headed blackbird, Xanthocephalus xanthocephalus; E, W, SP=r
- Bobolink, Dolichonyx oryzivorus; E, W, S=r
- Western meadowlark, Sturnella neglecta; N, E, W, SP=r, S=r, F=r
- Bullock's oriole, Icterus bullockii; N, E, W, SP=a, S=a
- Red-winged blackbird, Agelaius phoeniceus; N, E, W, SP=u, S=u
- Brown-headed cowbird, Molothrus ater; N, E, W, SP=u, S=u, F=u
- Rusty blackbird, Euphagus carolinus; E, W, S=a, F=a
- Brewer's blackbird, Euphagus cyanocephalus; E, W, S=r, F=r
- Common grackle, Quiscalus quiscula; E, S=r

== New World warblers ==
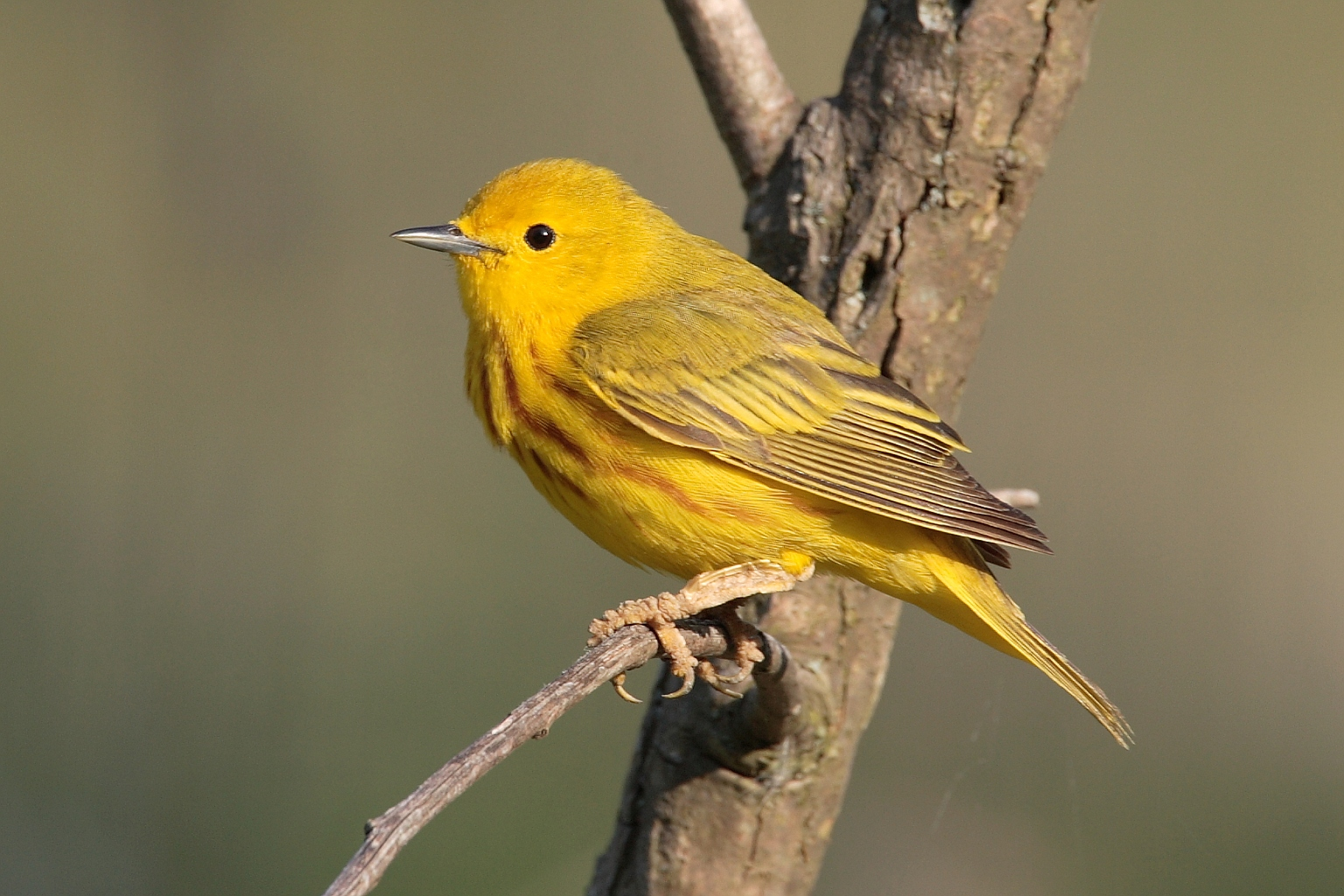
Yellow warbler

Order: Passeriformes Family: Parulidae

The wood-warblers are a group of small often colorful passerine birds restricted to the New World. Most are arboreal, but some like the ovenbird and the two waterthrushes, are more terrestrial. Most members of this family are insectivores. Sixteen species have been recorded in the park.

- Ovenbird, Seiurus aurocapilla; E, W, S=r
- Northern waterthrush, Parkesia noveboracensis; N, E, W, SP=c, S=c
- Tennessee warbler, Oreothlypis peregrina; N, E, W, SP=u, S=u
- Orange-crowned warbler, Oreothlypis celata; N, E, W, SP=u, S=u
- Nashville warbler, Oreothlypis ruficapilla; E, W, SP=r
- MacGillivray's warbler, Geothlypis tolmiei; N, E, W, SP=c, S=c
- Common yellowthroat, Geothlypis trichas; N, E, W, SP=c, S=c
- American redstart, Setophaga ruticilla; N, E, W, SP=u, S=u
- Cape May warbler, Setophaga tigrina; E, W, SP=a, S=a
- Northern parula, Setophaga americana; W, SP=a
- Bay-breasted warbler, Setophaga castanea; W, S=a
- Yellow warbler, Setophaga petechia; N, E, W, SP=c, S=c, F=u
- Blackpoll warbler, Setophaga striata; E, W, SP=r
- Yellow-rumped warbler, Setophaga coronata; N, E, W, SP=c, S=ab, F=u
- Townsend's warbler, Setophaga townsendi; N, E, W, SP=c, S=c
- Wilson's warbler, Cardellina pusilla; N, E, W, SP=c, S=c

== Cardinals and allies ==
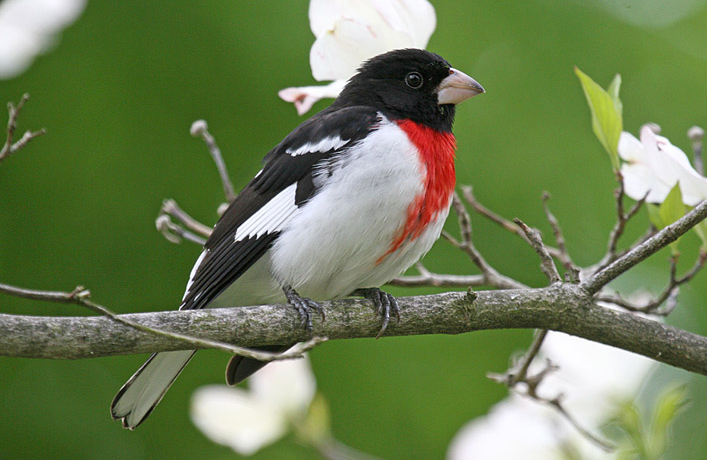
Rose-breasted grosbeak

Order: Passeriformes Family: Cardinalidae

The cardinals are a family of robust, seed-eating birds with strong bills. They are typically associated with open woodland. The sexes usually have distinct plumages. Five species have been recorded in the park.

- Western tanager, Piranga ludoviciana; N, E, W, SP=c, S=c, F=r
- Rose-breasted grosbeak, Pheucticus ludovicianus, N, E, W, SP=a
- Black-headed grosbeak, Pheucticus melanocephalus, N, E, W, SP=u, S=u, F=u
- Lazuli bunting, Passerina amoena; N, E, W, SP=u, S=u
- Indigo bunting, Passerina cyanea; W, S=a

== See also ==
- List of birds of Montana
- List of birds
- Lists of birds by region
- List of birds of North America
