= List of flora and fauna of Montana =

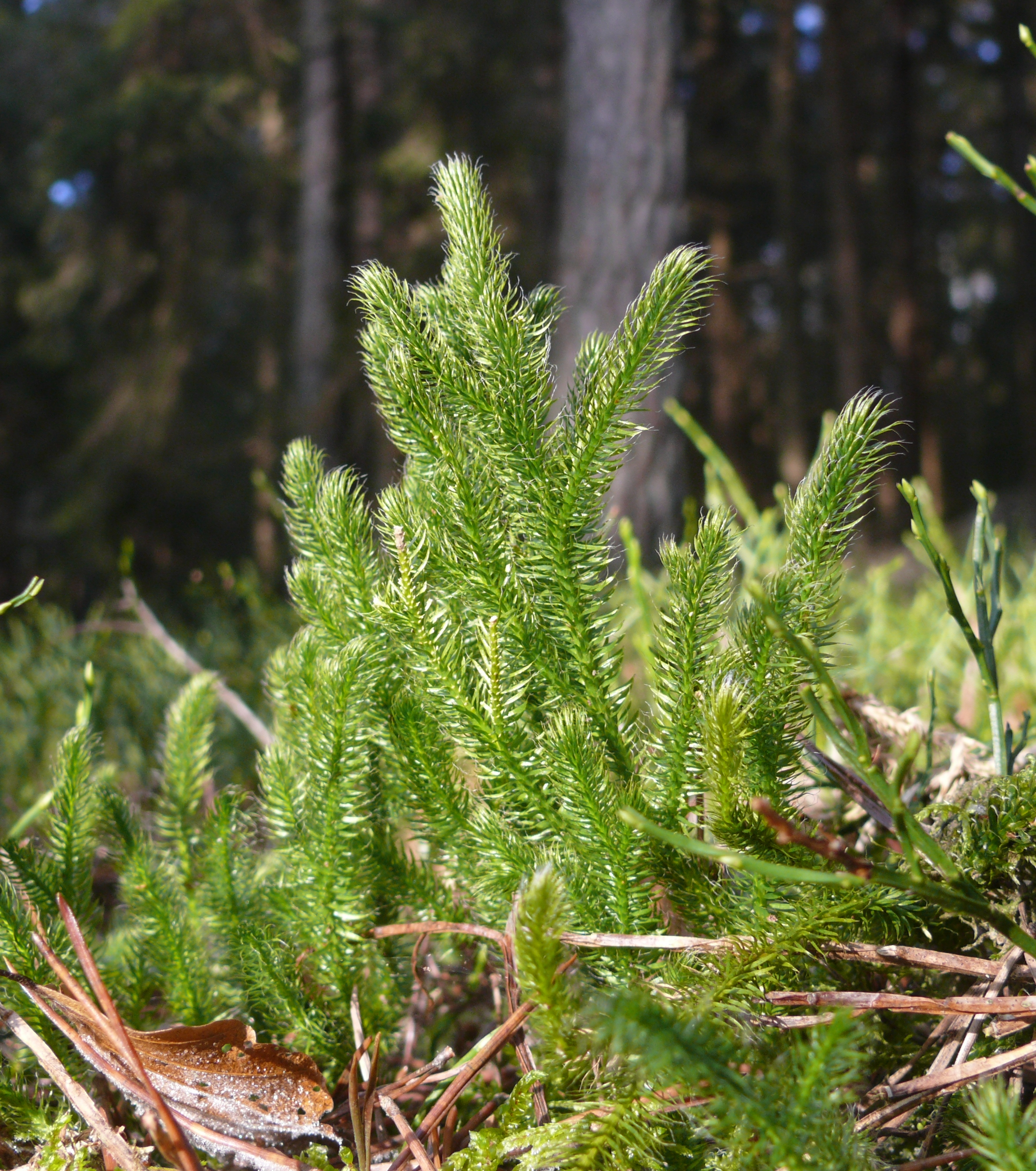
Staghorn Club Moss

Montana's large size, 147,046 square miles (380,850 km^{2}), and diverse Ecological systems of Montana make it home to a diverse array of flora and fauna.

This is a list of flora and fauna of Montana related articles.

- Club-mosses and mosses of Montana
  - There are at least 23 species of Club-mosses and 153 species of Mosses found in Montana.,
- Coniferous plants of Montana
  - There are at least 20 species of Gymnosperms or Coniferous plants in Montana.
- Ferns of Montana
- Horsetails of Montana
- Lichens of Montana
  - There are at least 41 species of lichens, Ascomycota known to exist in Montana.
- Dicotyledons of Montana
  - There are at least 2109 species of dicotyledons found in Montana according to the Montana Field Guide.
- Monocotyledons of Montana
  - There are at least 615 species of Monocotyledons found in Montana.

== Fauna ==
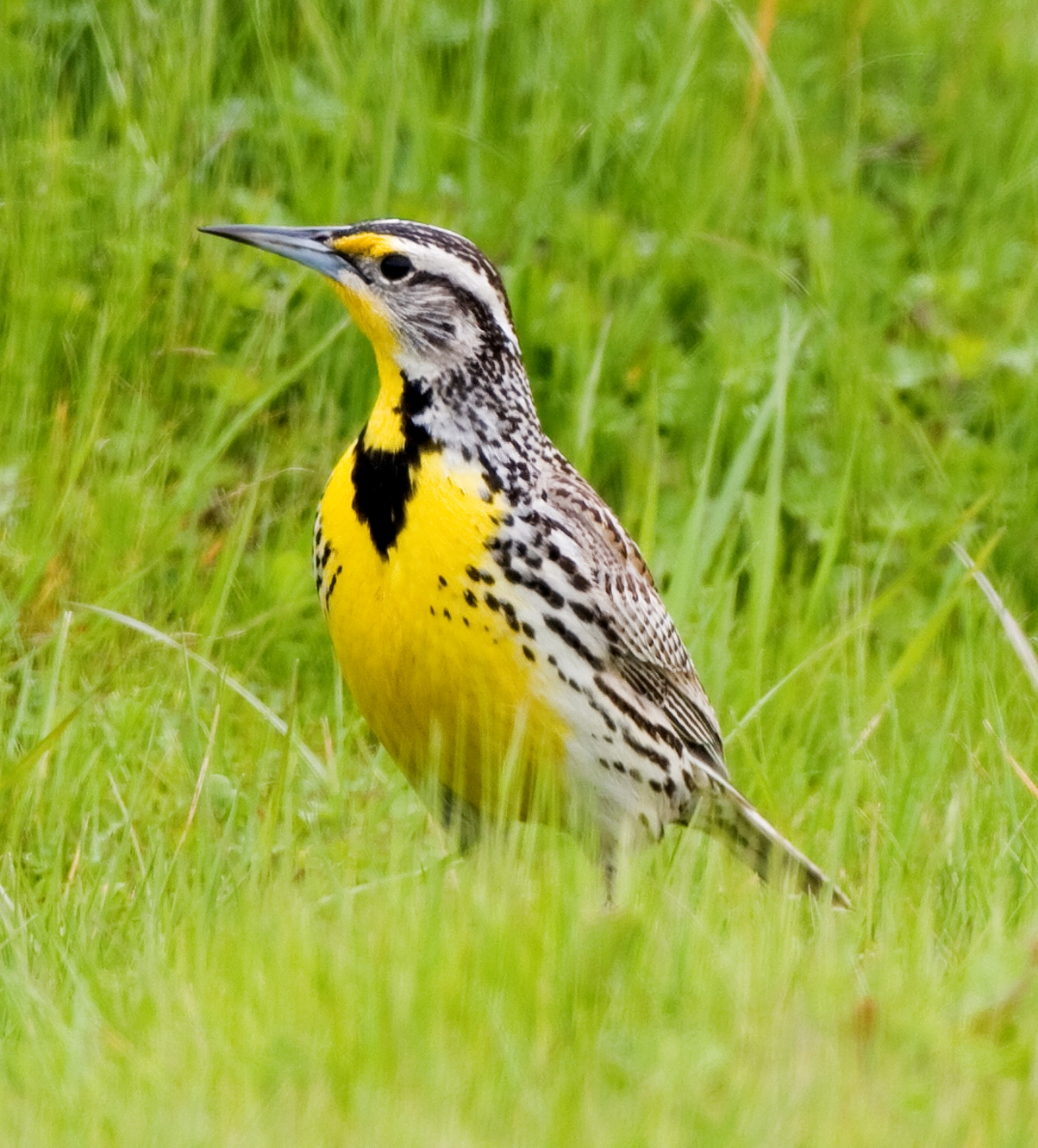
Western Meadowlark, state bird of Montana

- Amphibians and Reptiles of Montana
  - Montana is home to 14 amphibian species and 20 species of reptiles.
- Birds of Montana
  - There are at least 427 species of birds found in Montana.
- Molluscs of Montana
  - There are at least 42 species of freshwater bivalves (clams and mussels) known in Montana. There are also at least 155 species of gastropods found in Montana.
- Crustaceans of Montana
  - There are at least 30 species of crustaceans found in Montana.
- Fish of Montana
  - There are at least 31 game and 59 non-game fish species known to occur in Montana.
- Flatworms and leeches of Montana
- Insects of Montana
- Mammals of Montana
  - There are at least 19 large mammal and 96 small mammal species known to occur in Montana.
- Millipedes of Montana
