= List of fishes of Montana =

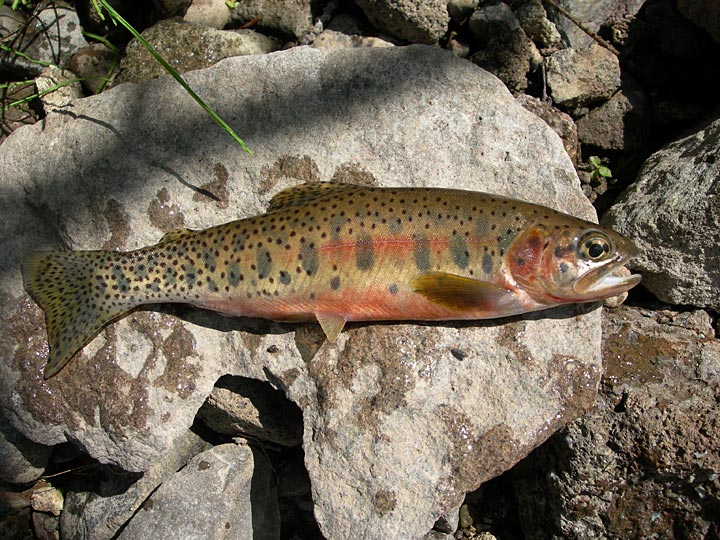
Westslope cutthroat trout

There are at least 31 game and 59 non-game fish species known to occur in Montana. Among Montana's fish, three are listed as endangered or threatened species and the Montana Department of Fish, Wildlife and Parks lists a number of species as species of concern.

Species are listed by common name, scientific name, typical habitat and occurrence. Common and scientific names are from the Montana Field Guide.

== Game fish ==
=== Trout ===
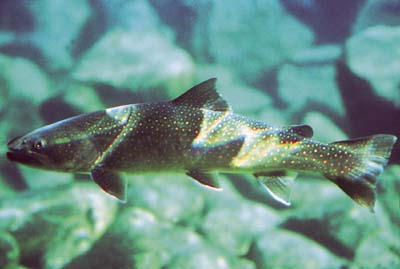
Bull trout

Order: Salmoniformes, Family: Salmonidae

- Native species
  - Westslope cutthroat trout, Oncorhynchus clarkii lewisi (Salish: pisɫ)
  - Yellowstone cutthroat trout, Oncorhynchus clarkii bouvieri
  - Columbia River redband trout, Oncorhynchus mykiss gairdneri
  - Bull trout, Salvelinus confluentus (Salish: aáy or ɫaʔáy; Kutenai: tuhuǂ)
  - Montana Arctic grayling, Thymallus arcticus montanus
  - Lake trout, Salvelinus namaycush
  - Mountain whitefish, Prosopium williamsoni (Salish: x̣ʷy̓u)
  - Pygmy whitefish, Prosopium coulteri
  - Lake whitefish, Coregonus clupeaformis

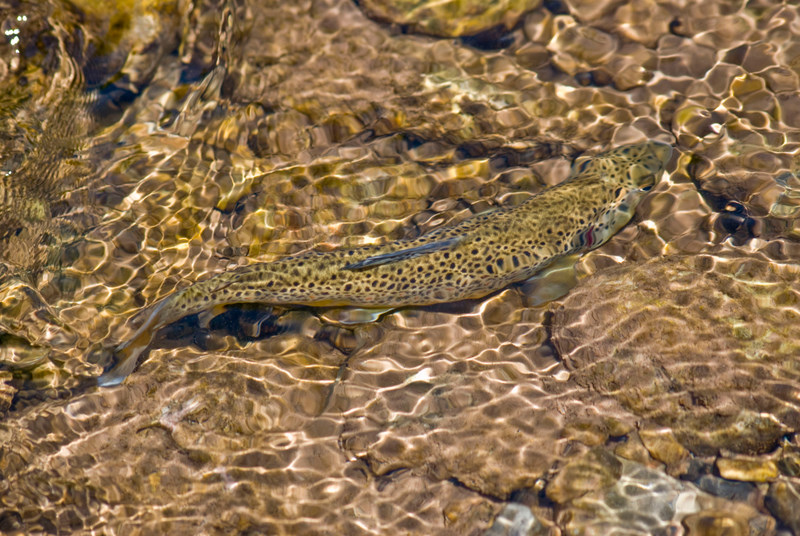
Brown trout

- Non-native, exotic species
  - Rainbow trout, Oncorhynchus mykiss (Other than the red band subspecies, rainbow trout are an introduced species in Montana)
  - Brown trout, Salmo trutta
  - Golden trout, Oncorhynchus mykiss aguabonita
  - Brook trout, Salvelinus fontinalis
  - Arctic grayling, Thymallus arcticus - adfluvial grayling introduced into Montana Lakes
  - Chinook salmon, Oncorhynchus tshawytscha
  - Kokanee salmon, Oncorhynchus nerka
  - Cisco, Coregonus artedi

=== Paddlefish ===
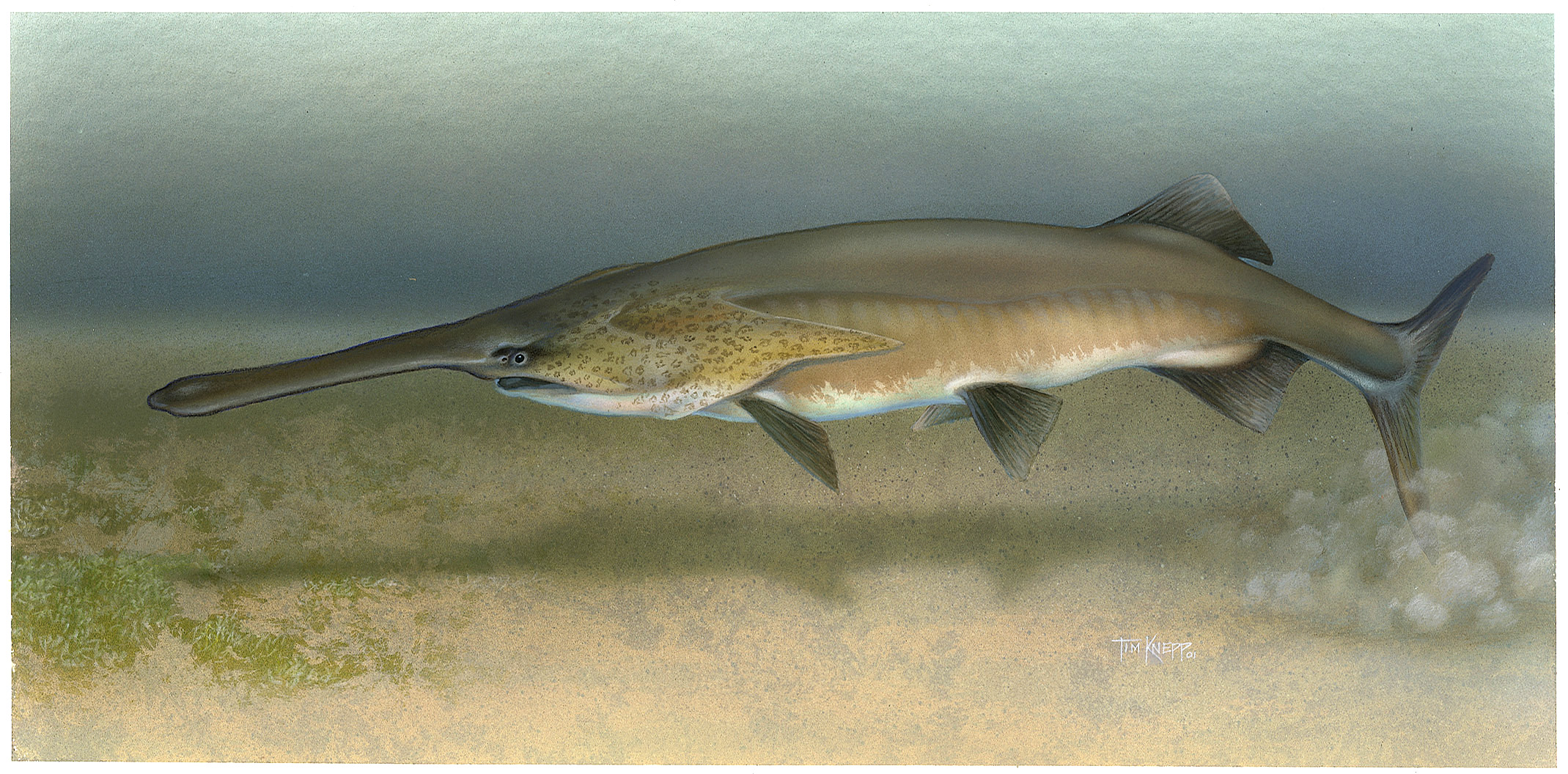
Paddlefish

Order: Acipenseriformes, Family: Polyodontidae

- Paddlefish, Polyodon spathula

=== Pike ===
Order: Esociformes, Family: Esocidae

- Non-native, exotic species
  - Northern pike, Esox lucius
  - Tiger muskellunge, Esox masquinongy × lucius

=== Bass, Sunfish ===
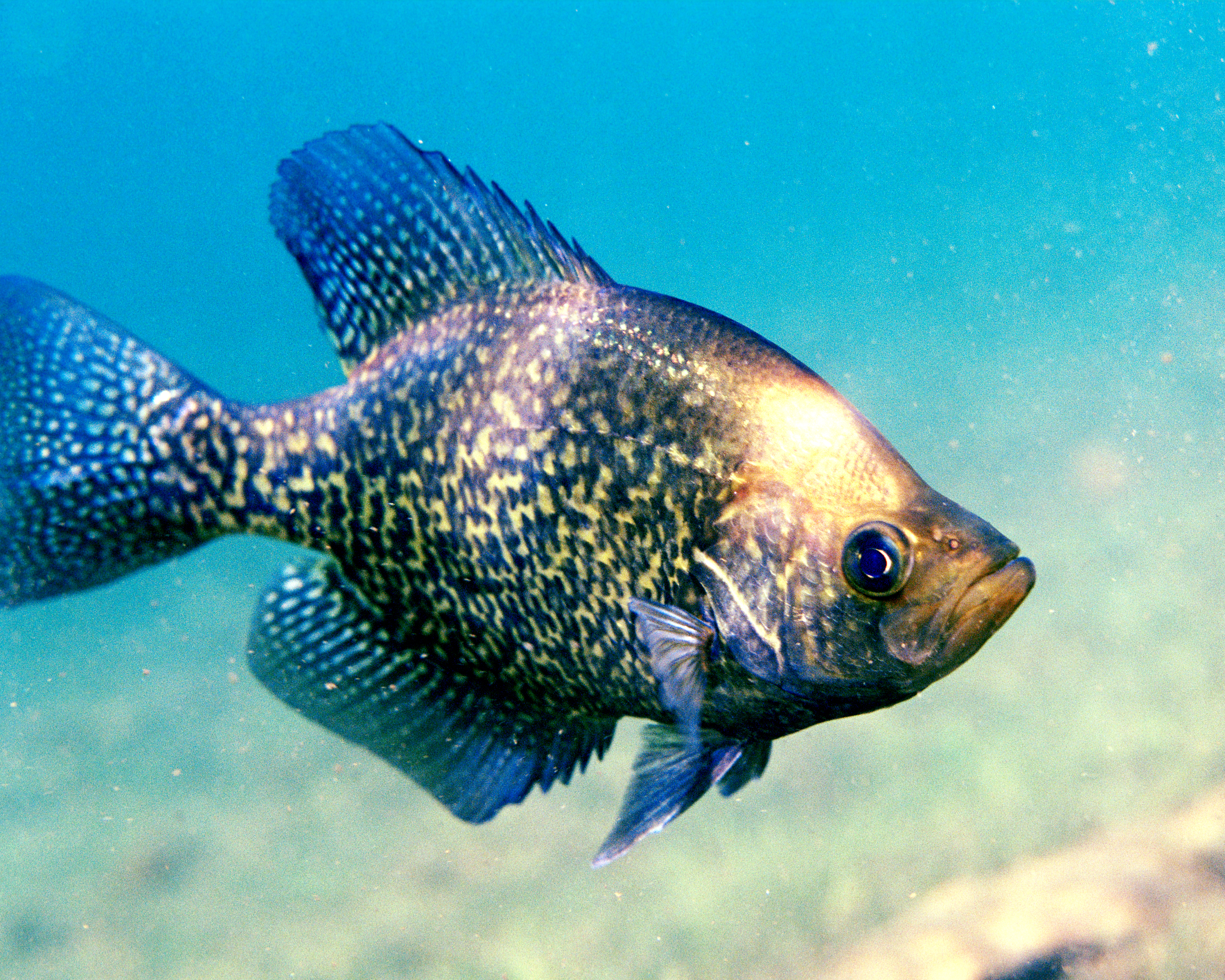
Black crappie

Order: Perciformes, Family: Centrarchidae

- Non-native, exotic species
  - Black crappie, Pomoxis nigromaculatus
  - Largemouth bass, Micropterus salmoides
  - Smallmouth bass, Micropterus dolomieu
  - White crappie, Pomoxis annularis

=== Perch ===
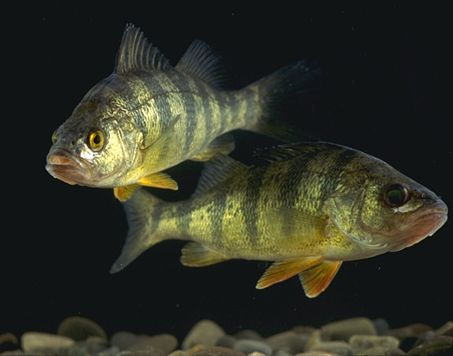
Yellow perch

Order: Perciformes, Family: Percidae

- Native species
  - Sauger, Sander canadensis
- Non-native, exotic species
  - Yellow perch, Perca flavescens
  - Walleye, Sander vitreus

=== Catfish ===
Order: Siluriformes, Family: Ictaluridae

- Native species
  - Channel catfish, Ictalurus punctatus

=== Sturgeon ===
Order: Acipenseriformes, Family: Acipenseridae

- Native species
  - Pallid sturgeon, Scaphirhynchus albus
  - Shovelnose sturgeon, Scaphirhynchus platorynchus
  - White sturgeon, Acipenser transmontanus

=== Burbot ===
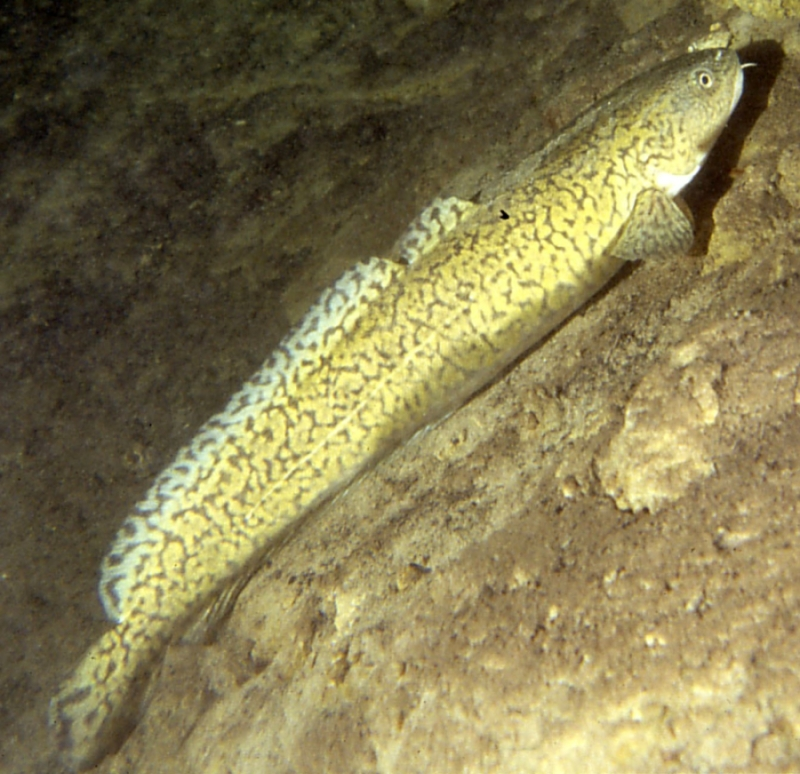
Burbot

Order: Gadiformes, Family: Gadidae

- Native species
  - Burbot, Lota lota

== Non-game fish ==
=== Bass, sunfish ===
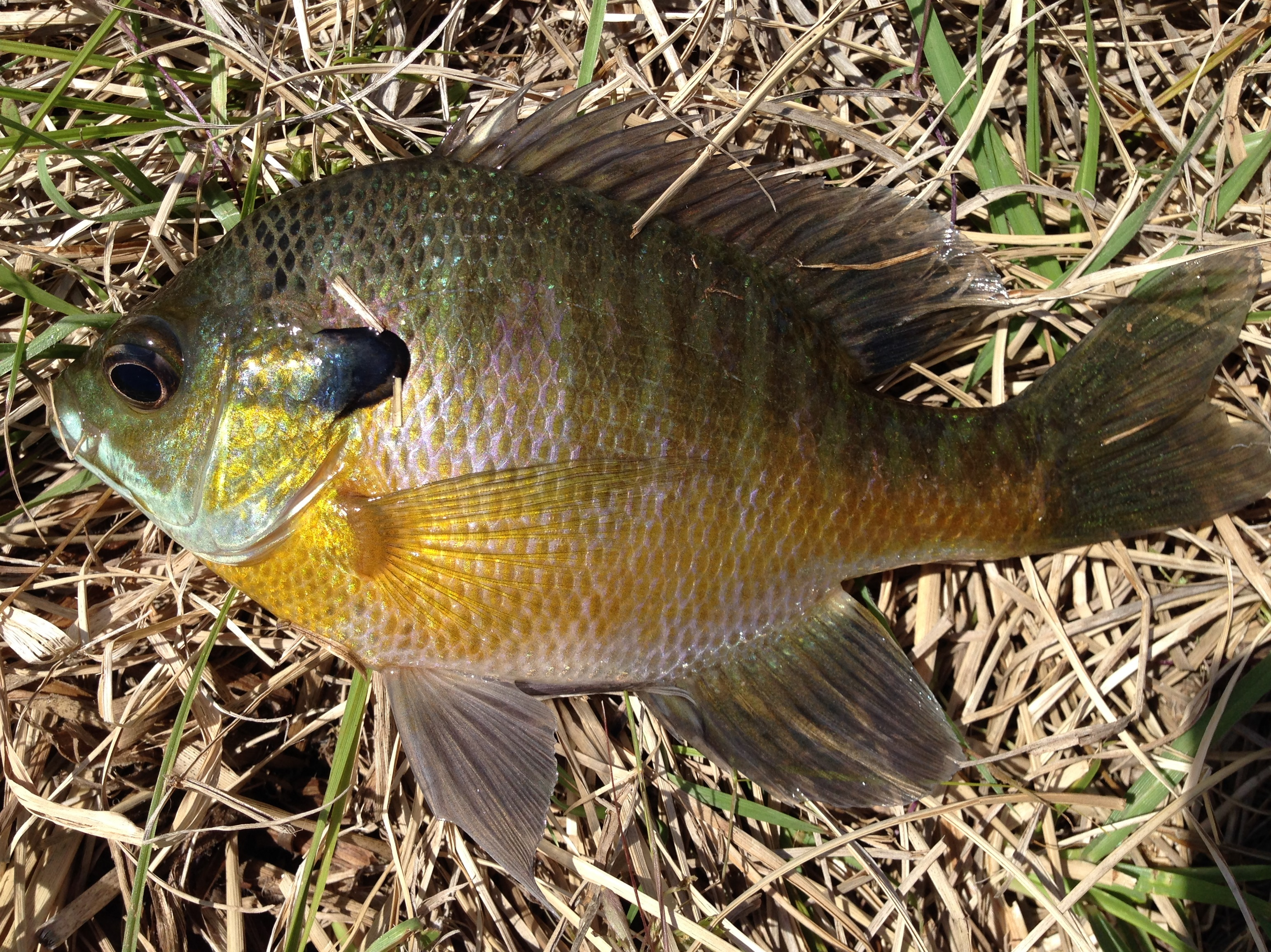
Bluegill

Order: Perciformes, Family: Centrarchidae

- Non-native, exotic species
  - Bluegill, Lepomis macrochirus
  - Green sunfish, Lepomis cyanellus
  - Pumpkinseed, Lepomis gibbosus
  - Rock bass, Ambloplites rupestris

=== Perch ===
Order: Perciformes, Family: Percidae

- Native species
  - Iowa darter, Etheostoma exile

=== Temperate basses ===
Order: Perciformes, Family: Moronidae

- Non-native, exotic species
  - White bass, Morone chrysops

=== Catfish ===
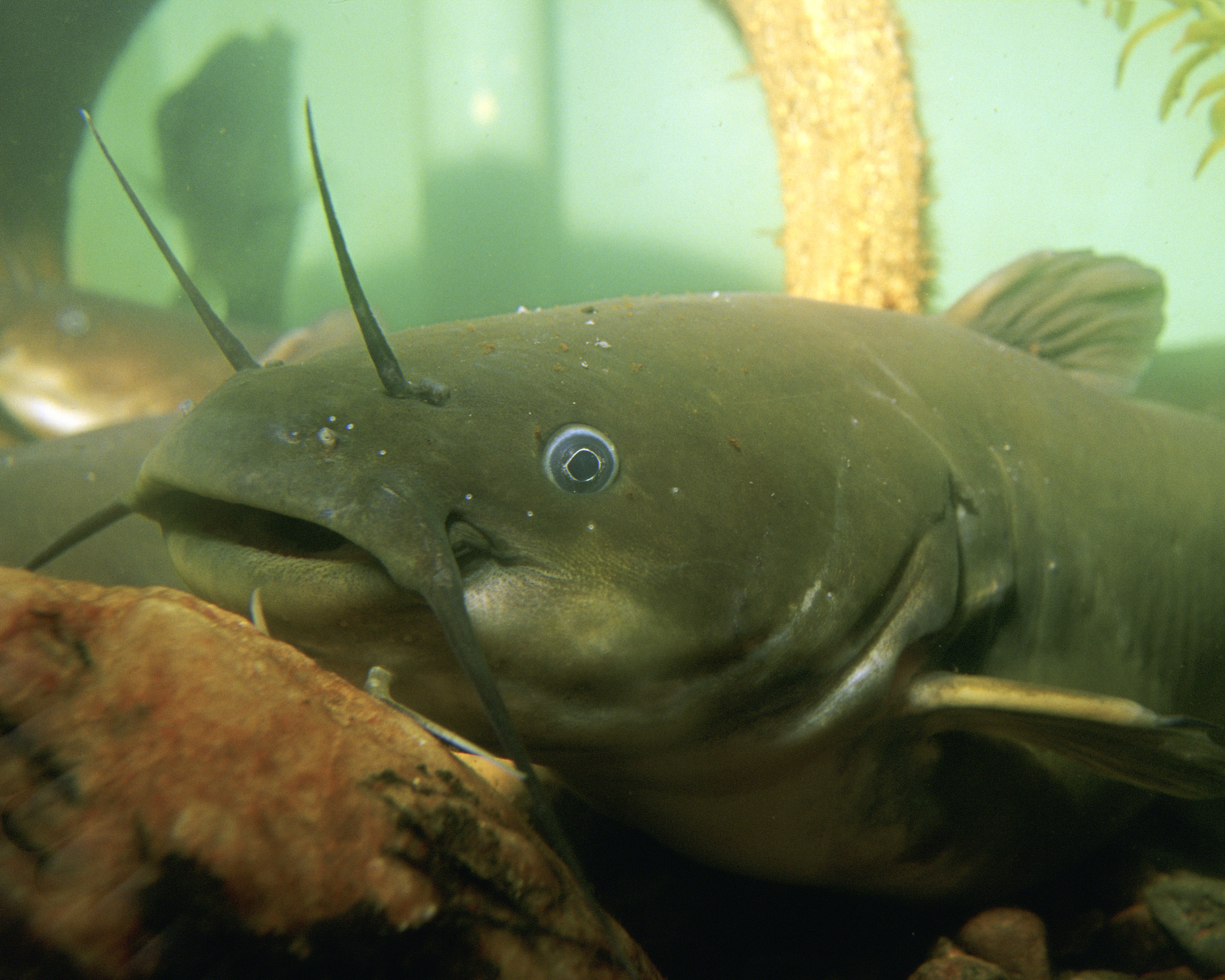
Yellow bullhead

Order: Siluriformes, Family: Ictaluridae

- Native species
  - Stonecat, Noturus flavus
- Non-native, exotic species
  - Black bullhead, Ameiurus melas
  - Yellow bullhead, Ameiurus natalis

=== Drum ===
Order: Perciformes, Family: Sciaenidae

- Native species
  - Freshwater drum, Aplodinotus grunniens

=== Smelt ===
Order: Salmoniformes, Family: Osmeridae

- Non native, exotic species
  - Rainbow smelt, Osmerus mordax

=== Gars ===
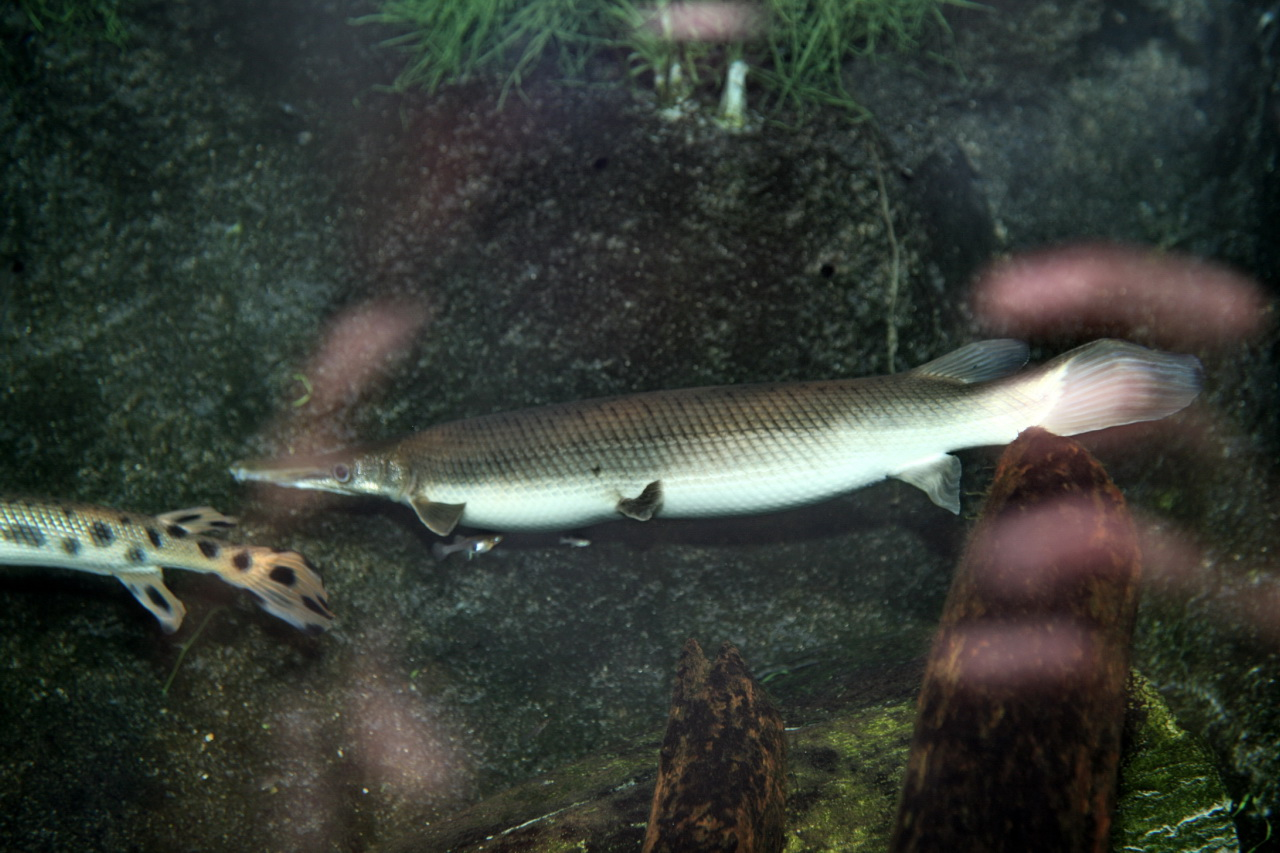
Shortnose gar

Order: Lepisosteiformes. Family: Lepisosteidae

- Native species
  - Shortnose gar, Lepisosteus platostomus

=== Mooneyes ===
Order: Hiodontiformes, Family: Hiodontidae

- Native species
  - Goldeye, Hiodon alosoides

=== Mollies ===
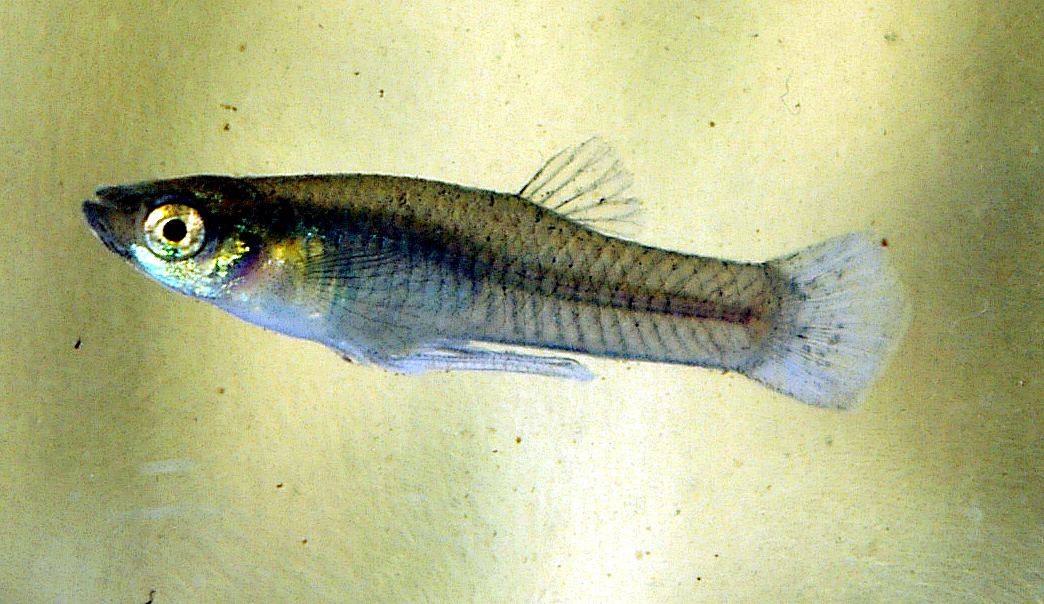
Mosquitofish

Order: Cyprinodontiformes, Family: Poeciliidae

- Non-native, exotic species
  - Green swordtail, Xiphophorus helleri
  - Sailfin molly, Poecilia latipinna
  - Shortfin molly, Poecilia mexicana
  - Variable platyfish, Xiphophorus variatus
  - Western mosquitofish, Gambusia affinis

=== Killifish ===
Order: Cyprinodontiformes, Family: Fundulidae

- Non-native, exotic species
  - Northern Plains killifish, Fundulus kansae
  - Banded killifish, Fundulus diaphanus

=== Minnows ===
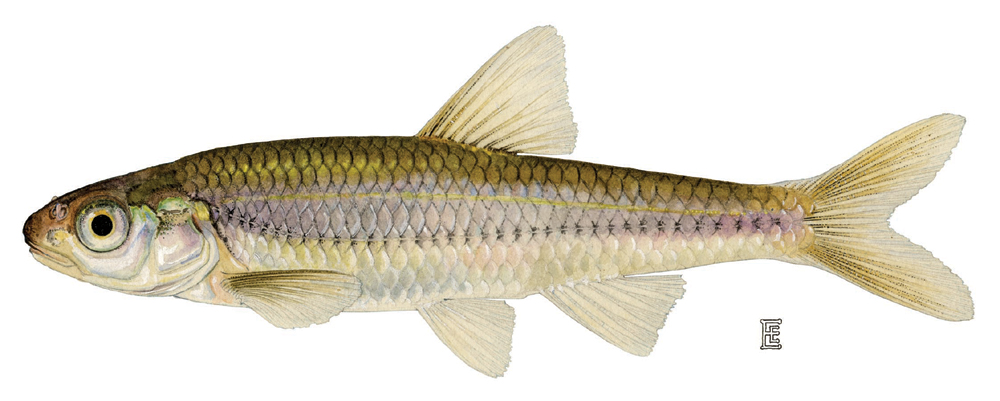
Sand shiner

Order: Cypriniformes, Family: Cyprinidae

- Native species
  - Brassy minnow, Hybognathus hankinsoni
  - Emerald shiner, Notropis atherinoides
  - Fathead minnow, Pimephales promelas
  - Flathead chub, Platygobio gracilis
  - Golden shiner, Notemigonus crysoleucas
  - Longnose dace, Rhinichthys cataractae
  - Northern pikeminnow, Ptychocheilus oregonensis (Salish: qʷq̓é)
  - Northern redbelly dace, Phoxinus eos
  - Peamouth, Mylocheilus caurinus
  - Allegheny pearl dace, Margariscus margarita
  - Northern pearl dace, Margariscus nachtriebi
  - Plains minnow, Hybognathus placitus
  - Redside shiner, Richardsonius balteatus
  - Sand shiner, Notropis stramineus
  - Sicklefin chub, Macrhybopsis meeki
  - Western silvery minnow, Hybognathus argyritis
  - Sturgeon chub, Macrhybopsis gelida
  - Lake chub, Couesius plumbeus
  - Creek chub, Semotilus atromaculatus
- Non-native, exotic species
  - Goldfish, Carassius auratus
  - Common carp, Cyprinus carpio
  - Spottail shiner, Notropis hudsonius
  - Utah chub, Gila atraria

=== Suckers ===
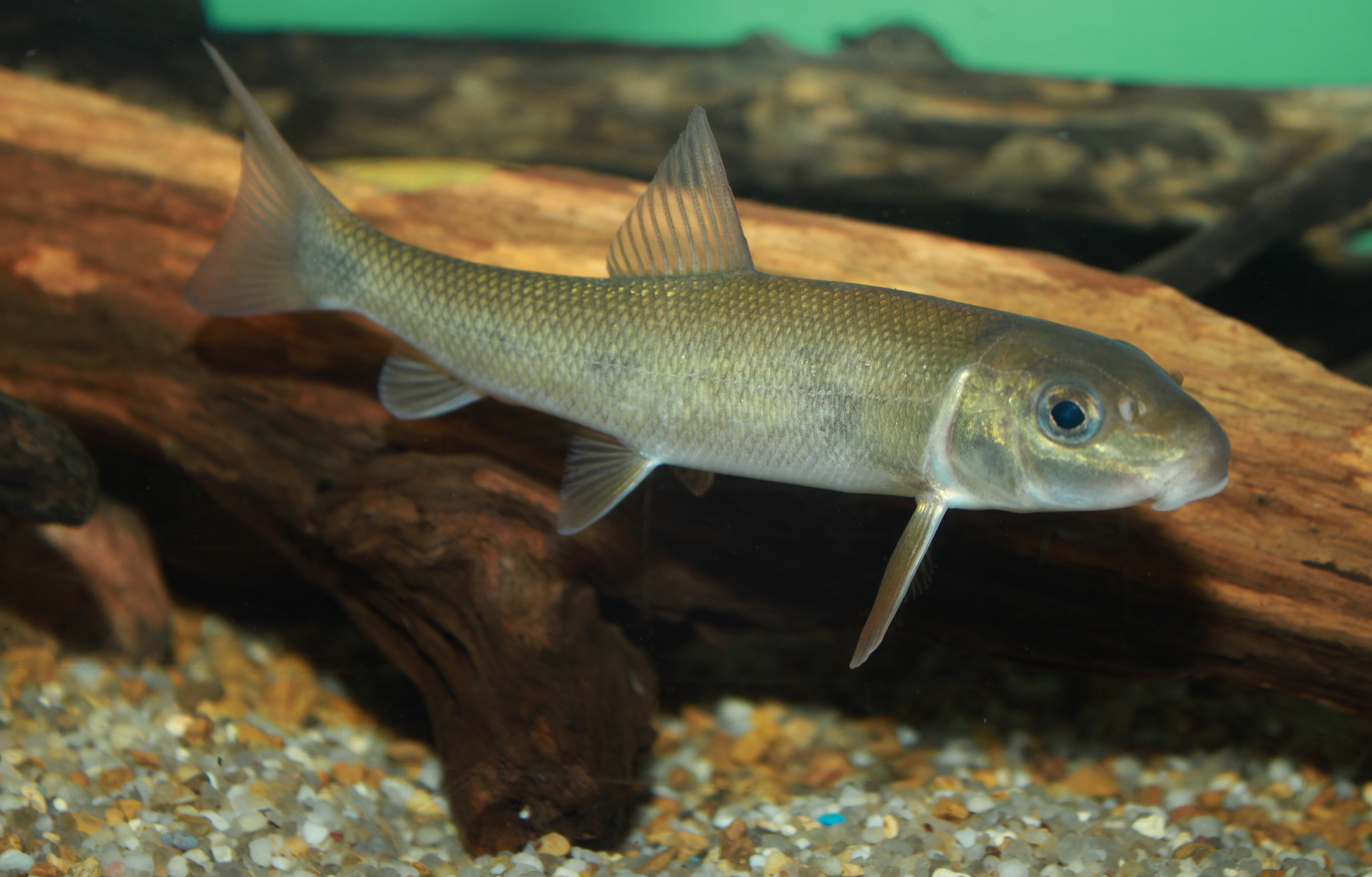
White sucker

Order: Cypriniformes, Family: Catostomidae

- Native species
  - Bigmouth buffalo, Ictiobus cyprinellus
  - Blue sucker, Cycleptus elongatus
  - Largescale sucker, Catostomus macrocheilus
  - Longnose sucker, Catostomus catostomus
  - Mountain sucker, Catostomus platyrhynchus
  - River carpsucker, Carpiodes carpio
  - Shorthead redhorse, Moxostoma macrolepidotum
  - Smallmouth buffalo, Ictiobus bubalus
  - White sucker, Catostomus commersoni

=== Mudminnows ===
Order: Esociformes, Family: Umbridae

- Non-native, exotic species
  - Central mudminnow, Umbra limi

=== Sculpins ===
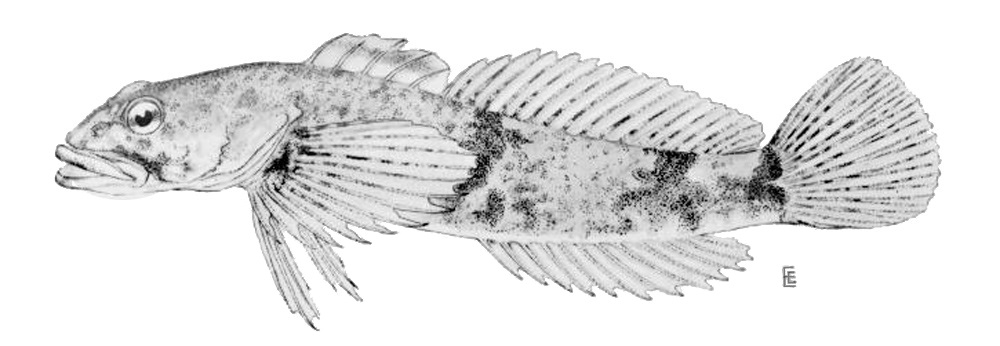
Mottled sculpin

Order: Scorpaeniformes, Family: Cottidae

- Native species
  - Deepwater sculpin, Myoxocephalus thompsonii
  - Mottled sculpin, Cottus bairdi
  - Slimy sculpin, Cottus cognatus
  - Spoonhead sculpin, Cottus ricei
  - Torrent sculpin, Cottus rhotheus

=== Sticklebacks ===
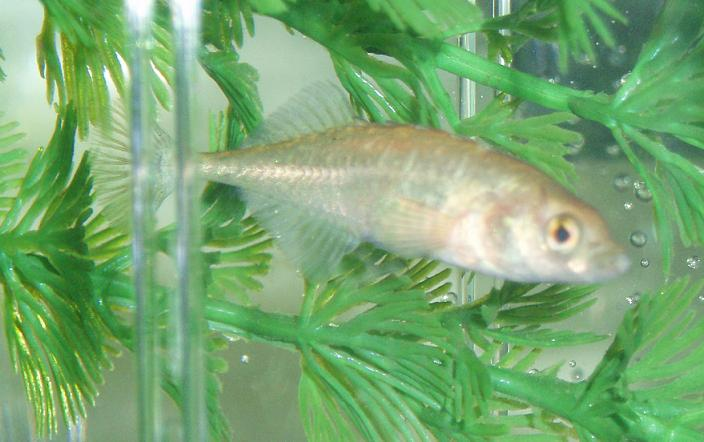
Brook stickleback

Order: Gasterosteiformes, Family: Gasterosteidae

- Native species
  - Brook stickleback, Culaea inconstans

=== Trout-perch ===
Order: Percopsiformes, Family: Percopsidae

- Native species
  - Trout-perch, Percopsis omiscomaycus

== See also ==
- List of amphibians and reptiles of Montana
- Birds of Montana
- List of non-marine molluscs of Montana
- Fishes of Yellowstone National Park
