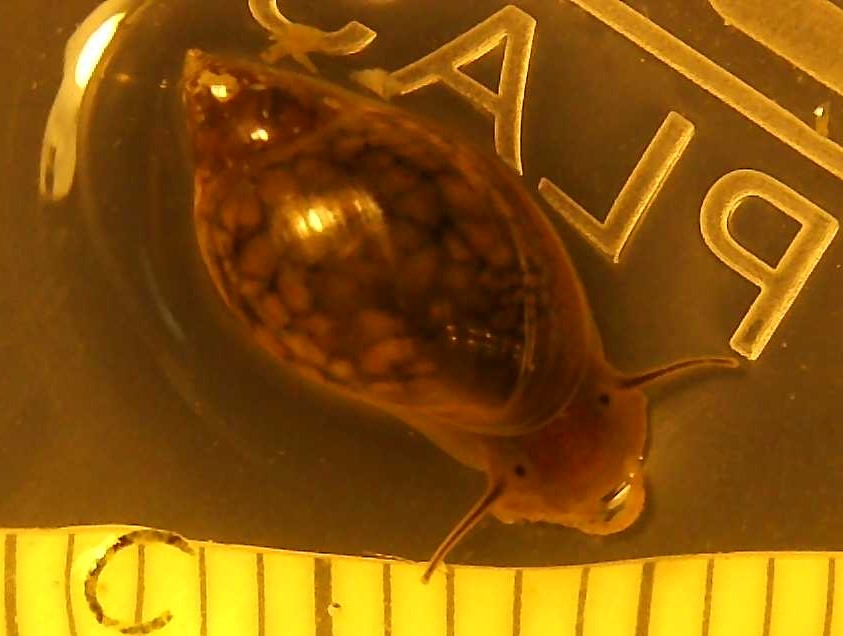
- Physa skinneri, live

Conservation status
- Secure (NatureServe)

Scientific classification
- Kingdom: Animalia
- Phylum: Mollusca
- Class: Gastropoda
- Superorder: Hygrophila
- Family: Physidae
- Genus: Physa
- Species: P. skinneri

Binomial name
- Physa skinneri Taylor, 1954

= Physa skinneri =

Species of freshwater snail

Physa skinneri, common name the glass physa, is a species of freshwater snail, an aquatic gastropod mollusc in the family Physidae.

== Description ==
The shell of Physa skinneri is thin, narrowly ovoid, to ovoid-fusiform, with an obtusely rounded apex. The spire is blunt with up to four weakly convex whorls separated by a shallow, broadly elongated suture. Maximum shell length is about 8.8 mm (5.2 mm wide). The aperture is about 60% of the overall shell length, elongate-oval, rounded anteriorly, acute posteriorly, widest about a third of the length from the anterior end. Outer lip thin, sharp, sometimes with a white band of callus thickening within, convex in the direction of growth.

== Distribution ==
This species occurs in:

- Canada and the northern United States. Museum specimens(Academy of Natural Sciences, Philadelphia; Invertebase Portal Collection) are known from Alaska, Maine, Massachusetts, New York, Pennsylvania, Ohio, Iowa, Michigan, North and South Dakota, Montana, Colorado, Wyoming, Utah, and Nevada. The holotype specimen (University of Michigan Museum of Zoology #181292) was a fossil from Beaver Co., Oklahoma (Taylor 1954). The species may be Holarctic in distribution based on shells found in Ukraine (Degtyarenko, E. and V. Anistratenko 2011).
- Montana USA
- Utah, USA
