= Vallonia perspectiva =

Conservation status
- Apparently Secure (NatureServe)

Scientific classification
- Kingdom: Animalia
- Phylum: Mollusca
- Class: Gastropoda
- Order: Stylommatophora
- Family: Valloniidae
- Genus: Vallonia
- Species: V. perspectiva

Binomial name
- Vallonia perspectiva Sterki, 1893

Species of gastropod

Vallonia perspectiva, commonly known as the thin-lip vallonia, is a species of small, air-breathing land snail, a terrestrial pulmonate gastropod mollusk in the family Valloniidae.

== Distribution ==
It is native to the United States and Canada.

== See also ==
- List of non-marine molluscs of Montana
