= List of non-marine mollusks of Montana =

Location of Montana

The non-marine mollusks of Montana — a part of the molluscan fauna of the state in the Northwestern United States. The non-marine mollusks of Montana consist of land snails and slugs as well as freshwater snails, freshwater mussels and freshwater clams.

== Species ==
A number of species of non-marine molluscs are found in the wild in Montana.

Gastropods

There at least 155 species of gastropods found in Montana. Some of these species are exotics (not native to Montana) and some species have been designated as Species of Concern.

Freshwater bivalves

There are at least 42 species of freshwater bivalves known in Montana. The Montana Department of Fish, Wildlife and Parks has identified a number of bivalve species as Species of Concern.

== List of non-marine mollusks ==
Summary table of number of species:
Numbers of molluscs by habitat	Number of species
Freshwater gastropods	??
Land gastropods	??
Total number of non-marine gastropods	155
Freshwater bivalves	42
Total number of non-marine molluscs	197

== Freshwater gastropods ==
Freshwater gastropods in Montana include:

Bithyniidae

- Bithynia tentaculata (mud bithynia)

Thiaridae

- Melanoides tuberculata (red-rimmed melania)

Valvatidae

- Valvata lewisi (fringed valvata)
- Valvata humeralis
- Valvata sincera (mossy valvata)
- Valvata tricarinata (three-ridge valvata)

Hydrobiidae

- Pyrgulopsis bedfordensis
- Fluminicola fuscus (ashy pebblesnail)
- Probythinella emarginata
- Potamopyrgus antipodarum (New Zealand mud snail)
- Colligyrus greggi
- Amnicola limosus (mud amnicola)
- an undescribed species of Amnicola, currently known as "lake amnicola" or "Amnicola sp. 1"

Acroloxidae

- Acroloxus coloradensis (Rocky Mountain capshell)

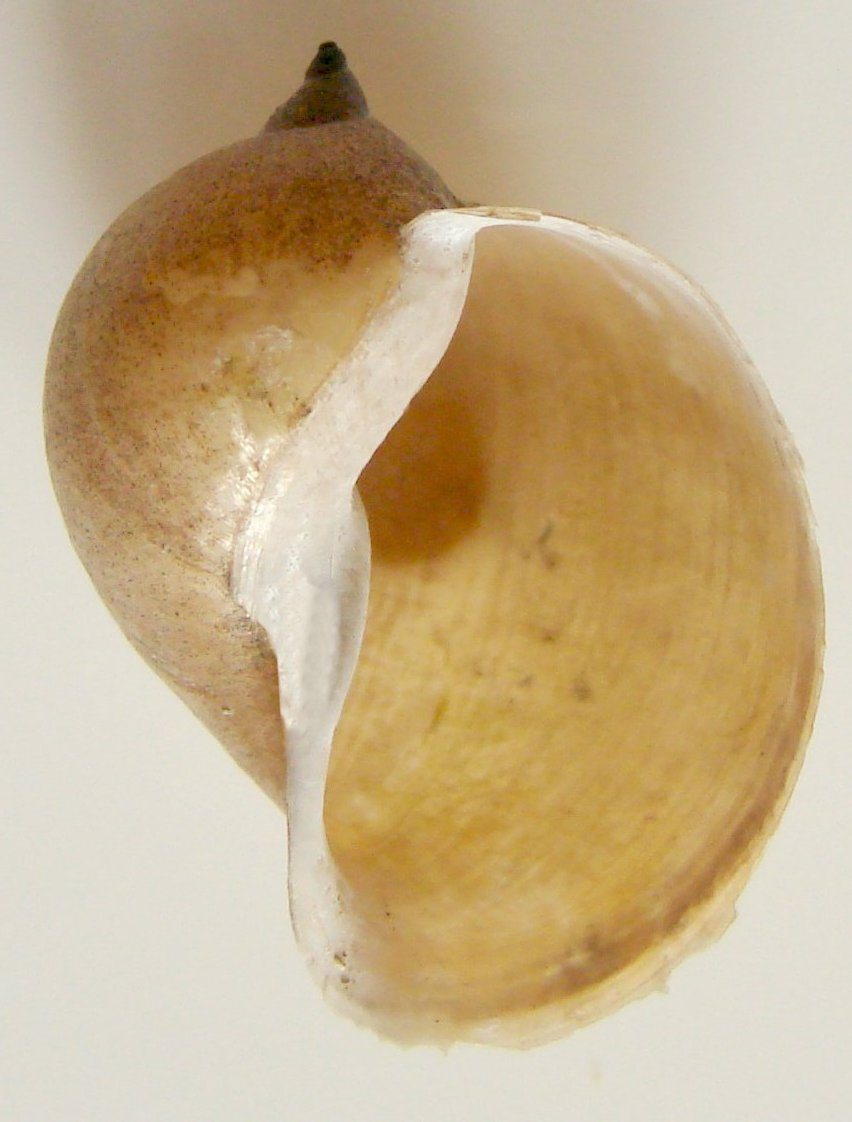
Radix auricularia

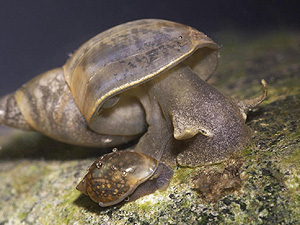
Lymnaea stagnalis

Lymnaeidae

- Ladislavella apicina
- Radix auricularia (big-ear radix)
- Galba dalli
- Ladislavella elrodi
- Galba obrussa
- Ladislavella elrodiana
- Galba humilis
- Ladislavella elodes (marsh pondsnail)
- Pseudosuccinea columella (American ribbed fluke snail)
- Walterigalba montanensis
- Galba bulimoides (prairie fossaria)
- Galba parva
- Galba modicella (rock fossaria)
- Fisherola nuttalli
- Lymnaea stagnalis (great palm snail)
- Ladislavella traski
- Ladislavella catascopium
- Hinkleyia caperata (wrinkled marshsnail)

Physidae

- Physella vinosa (banded physa)
- Physa skinneri (glass physa)
- Sibirenauta elongata
- Physa megalochlamys (cloaked physa)
- Beringophysa jennessi
- Physella acuta (pewter physa)
- Physella virgata
- Physella propinqua (Rocky Mountain physa)
- Physella columbiana (rotund physa)
- Physella gyrina (tadpole physa)
- Physella lordi (twisted physa)
- Physella zionis (wet rock physa)

Planorbidae

- Gyraulus parvus (ash gyro)
- Menetus opercularis
- Gyraulus circumstriatus (disk gyro)
- Planorbella pilsbryi
- Gyraulus deflectus (flexed gyro)
- Planorbella trivolvis
- Planorbula campestris
- Planorbella subcrenata
- Promenetus exacuous
  - Promenetus exacuous megas
- Armiger crista (nautilus ramshorn)
- Planorbula armigera
- Helisoma anceps (two-ridge rams-horn)
- Promenetus umbilicatellus
- Ferrissia rivularis (creeping ancylid)
- Ferrissia fragilis (fragile ancylid)
- Ferrissia parallelus (oblong ancylid)

== Land gastropods ==
Land gastropods in Montana include:

Succineidae

- Catinella rehderi
- Catinella vermeta
- Oxyloma decampi
- Oxyloma gouldi (Marshall ambersnail)
- Oxyloma haydeni
- Oxyloma missoula (ninepipes ambersnail)
- Oxyloma nuttallianum (oblique ambersnail)
- Oxyloma retusum (blunt ambersnail)
- Succinea grosvenori (Santa Rita ambersnail)

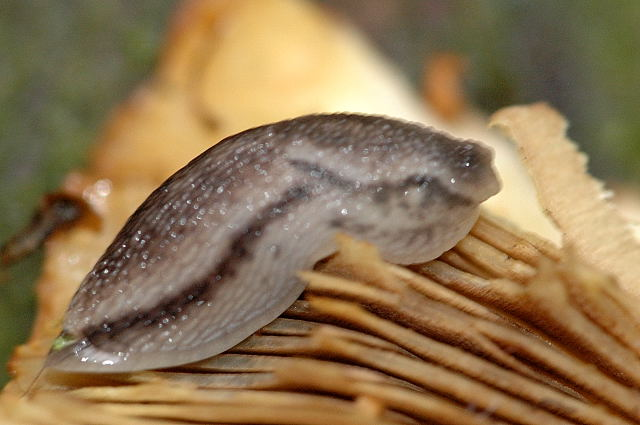
Arion circumscriptus

Arionidae

- Arion ater (black slug)
  - Arion ater rufus (red slug)
- Arion circumscriptus (brown-banded arion)
- Arion distinctus (darkface arion)
- Arion fasciatus (orange-banded arion)
- Arion intermedius (hedgehog slug)
- Arion subfuscus (dusky arion)
- Hemphillia camelus
- Hemphillia danielsi (marbled jumping-slug)
- Kootenaia burkei
- Magnipelta mycophaga
- Prophysaon andersonii (reticulate taildropper)
- Prophysaon humile (smoky taildropper)
- Udosarx lyrata
  - Udosarx lyrata lyrata
  - Udosarx lyrata russelli
- Zacoleus idahoensis

Megomphicidae

- Polygyrella polygyrella

Vertiginidae

- Columella columella
- Columella edentula (toothless column snail)
- Gastrocopta armifera (armed snaggletooth)
- Gastrocopta holzingeri
- Gastrocopta pentodon (comb snaggletooth)
- Vertigo binneyana
- Vertigo concinnula
- Vertigo cristata
- Vertigo elatior
- Vertigo gouldii (variable vertigo)
- Vertigo modesta (cross vertigo)
- Vertigo ovata (ovate vertigo)

Pupillidae

- Pupilla blandii (Rocky Mountain column)
- Pupilla hebes (crestless column)
- Pupilla muscorum (widespread column)
- Pupilla syngenes (top-heavy column)

Discidae

- Anguispira kochi (banded tigersnail)
- Discus whitneyi (forest disc)
- Discus brunsoni (lake disc)
- Discus shimekii (striate disc)

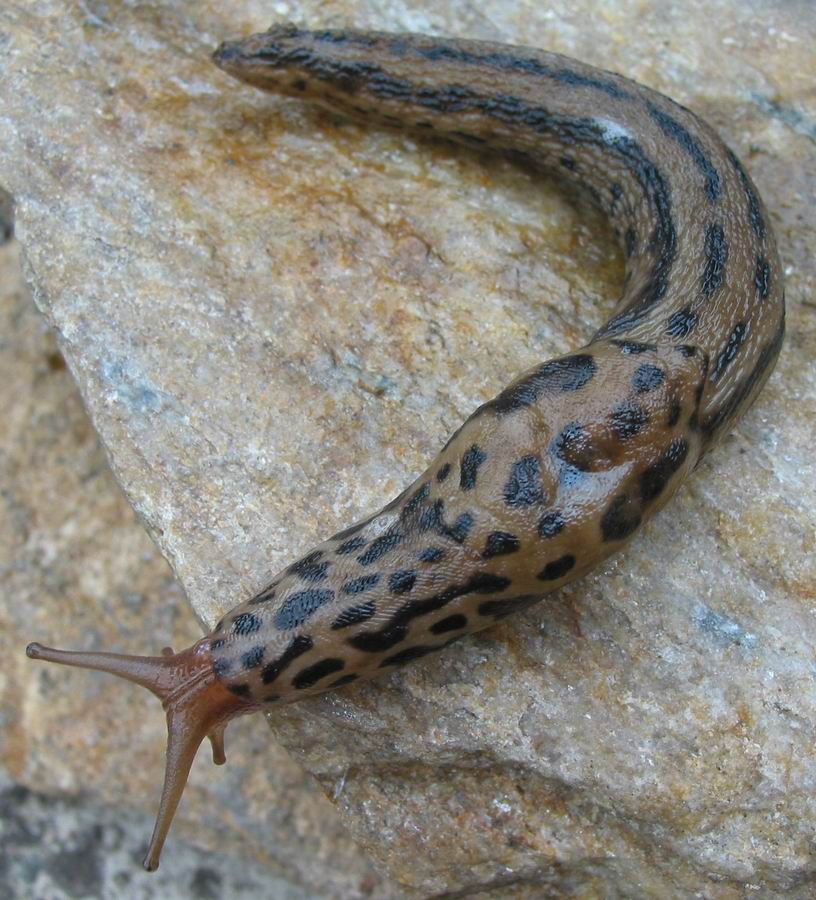
Limax maximus

Limacidae

- Limax maximus (leopard slug)

Agriolimacidae

- Deroceras laeve (marsh slug)
- Deroceras panormitanum
- Deroceras reticulatum (grey field slug)

Oxychilidae

- Nesovitrea binneyana (blue glass snail)
- Nesovitrea electrina
- Oxychilus alliarius (garlic snail)
- Oxychilus draparnaudi (Draparnaud's glass snail)

Gastrodontidae

- Striatura pugetensis
- Zonitoides arboreus (quick gloss snail)
- Zonitoides nitidus (black gloss)

Pristilomatidae

- Hawaiia minuscula (minute gem snail)
- Pristiloma arcticum
- Pristiloma chersinella
- Pristiloma wascoense

Vitrinidae

- Vitrina pellucida

Euconulidae

- Euconulus fulvus

Haplotrematidae

- Haplotrema vancouverense (robust lancetooth)

Oreohelicidae

- Oreohelix alpina (subalpine mountainsnail)
- Oreohelix amariradix (Bitter Root mountainsnail)
- Oreohelix carinifera (keeled mountainsnail)
- Oreohelix elrodi (carinate mountainsnail)
- Oreohelix haydeni (lyrate mountainsnail)
- Oreohelix pygmaea (pygmy mountainsnail)
- Oreohelix strigosa (rocky mountainsnail)
  - Oreohelix strigosa berryi
  - Oreohelix strigosa depressa
- Oreohelix subrudis (subalpine mountainsnail)
- Oreohelix yavapai (Yapavai mountainsnail)
  - Oreohelix yavapai mariae

Polygyridae

- Allogona ptychophora (Idaho forestsnail)
- Cryptomastix mullani (Coeur d'Alene Oregonian snail)
- Cryptomastix sanburni

Cochlicopidae

- Cochlicopa lubrica

Charopidae

- Radiodiscus abietum

Punctidae

- Paralaoma servilis
- Punctum randolphii
- Punctum californicum
- Punctum minutissimum

Thysanophoridae

- Microphysula ingersolli

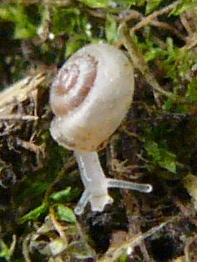
Vallonia pulchella

Valloniidae

- Vallonia albula
- Vallonia costata
- Vallonia cyclophorella (silky vallonia)
- Vallonia gracilicosta (multirib vallonia)
- Vallonia perspectiva (thin lip vallonia)
- Vallonia pulchella (lovely vallonia)
- Zoogenetes harpa (boreal top)

== Freshwater bivalves ==
Freshwater bivalves in Montana include:

Margaritiferidae

- Margaritifera falcata (western pearlshell)

Unionidae

- Lampsilis siliquoidea (fatmucket)
- Lasmigona complanata (white heelsplitter)
- Ligumia recta (black sandshell)
- Pyganodon grandis (giant floater)
- Quadrula quadrula (mapleleaf)

Sphaeriidae

- Conventus conventus (arctic-alpine pea clam)
- Euglesa casertanum (pea cockle)
- Euglesa lilljeborgii
- Musculium partumeium
- Musculium securis
- Pisidium adamsi
- Pisidium arbortivum
- Pisidium compressum
- Pisidium fallax
- Pisidium ferrugineum
- Pisidium idahoense
- Pisidium imbecille
- Pisidium insigne
- Pisidium milium
- Pisidium nitidum (shining pea clam)
- Pisidium obtusale
- Pisidium ovum
- Pisidium roperi
- Pisidium rotundatum
- Pisidium scutulatum
- Pisidium subtruncatum
- Pisidium variabile
  - Pisidium variabile magnum
- Pisidium ventricosum
- Pisidium walkeri
- Sphaerium fabale
- Sphaerium lacustre (lake fingernail clam)
- Sphaerium nitidum (arctic fingernail clam)
- Sphaerium occidentale
- Sphaerium patella
- Sphaerium rhomboideum (rhomboid fingernail clam)
- Sphaerium simile
- Sphaerium striatinum
- Sphaerium sulcatum
- Sphaerium tenue
- Sphaerium transversum

== See also ==
- List of non-marine molluscs of the United States
- List of flora and fauna of Montana
