= List of non-marine molluscs of Croatia =

Location of Croatia

The non-marine molluscs of Croatia are a part of the molluscan fauna of Croatia (wildlife of Croatia).

A number of species of non-marine molluscs are found in the wild in Croatia.

== Freshwater gastropods ==
Neritidae

- Theodoxus fluviatilis (Linnaeus, 1758)

Bithyniidae

- Bithynia tentaculata (Linnaeus, 1758)

Hydrobiidae

- Dalmatinella simonae Beran & Rysiewska, 2021
- Horatia klecakiana Bourguignat, 1887
- Horatia knorri Schütt, 1961
- Horatia ozimeci Grego & Falniowski, 2021
- Horatia stygorumina Grego & Rysiewska, 2021
- Litthabitella chilodia (Westerlund, 1886)
- Montenegrospeum sketi Grego & Glöer, 2018
- Plagigeyeria jalzici Cindrić & Slapnik, 2019
- Radomaniola curta curta (Küster, 1852)
- Saxurinator brandti Schütt, 1968

Moitessieriidae

- Iglica bagliviaeformis Schütt, 1970
- Lanzaia vjetranicae Kuscer, 1930
- Paladilhiopsis insularis Cindrić & Slapnik, 2019
- Paladilhiopsis cf. montenegrinus Schütt, 1959
- Paladilhiopsis stellatus Grego & Hofman, 2021

Valvatidae

- Valvata piscinalis (O. F. Müller, 1774)

Lymnaeidae

- Galba truncatula (O. F. Müller, 1774)
- Peregriana peregra (O. F. Müller, 1774)
- Stagnicola fuscus (C. Pfeiffer, 1821)

Physidae

- Physella acuta (Draparnaud, 1805)
- Physa fontinalis (Linnaeus, 1758)

Planorbidae

- Ancylus fluviatilis (O. F. Müller, 1774)
- Anisus vorticulus (Troschel, 1834) - in the Krka National Park. First finding of this species in Croatia was in 2009.

== Land gastropods ==
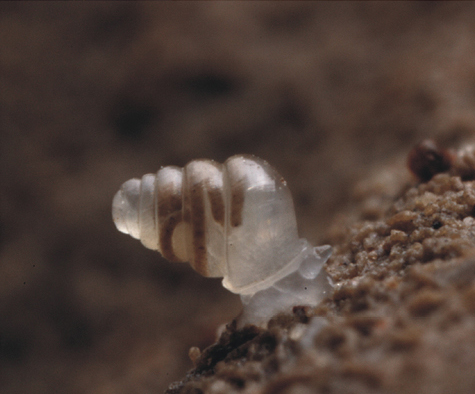
A live individual of Zospeum tholussum discovered in 2013, deep in Lukina Jama–Trojama cave system in Croatia

Aegopinella

- Aegopinella ressmanni (Westerlund, 1883)

Cyclophoridae

- Pholeoteras euthrix Sturany, 1904

Cochlostomatidae

- Cochlostoma auritum meridionale (O. Boettger, 1886)
- Cochlostoma cinerascens beauforti (Clessin, 1887)

Aciculidae

- Platyla similis (Reinhardt, 1880)
- Renea spectabilis (Rossmässler, 1839)

Pomatiidae

- Pomatias elegans (O. F. Müller, 1774)

Ellobiidae

- Zospeum tholussum Weigand, 2013

Azecidae

- Hypnophila pupaeformis (Cantraine, 1836)

Lauriidae

- Lauria cylindracea (Da Costa, 1778)
- Lauria sempronii (Charpentier, 1837)

Pagodulinidae

- Pagodulina pagodula gracilis (Westerlund, 1897)

Agardhiellidae

- Agardhiella formosa (L. Pfeiffer, 1848)

Valloniidae

- Acanthinula aculeata (O. F. Müller, 1774)

Pyramidulidae

- Pyramidula rupestris (Draparnaud, 1801)

Chondrinidae

- Rupestrella rhodia (Roth, 1839)
- Chondrina spelta spelta (Beck, 1837)

Truncatellinidae

- Truncatellina callicratis (Scacchi, 1833)
- Truncatellina velkovrhi Štamol, 1995
- Truncatellina lussinensis Štamol, 1995

Vertiginidae

- Vertigo pusilla O. F. Müller, 1774
- Vertigo pygmaea (Draparnaud, 1801)

Enidae

- Ena subtilis (Rossmässler, 1837)
- Chondrula quinquedentata (Rossmässler, 1837)

Clausiliidae

- Agathylla sulcosa (Schub. & Wagner, 1829)
- Charpentieria stigmatica stigmatica (Rossmässler, 1836)
- Delima binotata saturella (H. Nordsieck, 1969)
- Delima laevissima laevissima (Rossmässler, 1834)
- Medora dalmatina epidaurica (A. Schmidt, 1867)

Ferussaciidae

- Cecilioides acicula (O. F. Müller, 1774)
- Cecilioides sp. aff. janii (De Betta & Martin, 1855)

Spiraxidae

- Poiretia cornea (Brumati, 1838)

Punctidae

- Punctum pygmaeum (Draparnaud, 1801)
- Paralaoma servilis (Shuttleworth, 1852)

Helicodiscidae

- Lucilla singleyana (Pilsbry, 1890)

Pristilomatidae

- Vitrea botterii (L. Pfeiffer, 1853)
- Vitrea contracta (Westerlund, 1871)
- Vitrea crystallina (O. F. Müller, 1774)

Oxychilidae

- Oxychilus hydatinus (Rossmässler, 1838)
- Oxychilus planorbis (Möllendorff, 1899)

Zonitidae

- Paraegopis albanicus (Rossmässler, 1836)

Geomitridae

- Cernuella cisalpina (Rossmässler, 1837)
- Cernuella virgata (Da Costa, 1778)

Hygromiidae

- Xerocampylaea erjaveci (Brusina, 1870)
- Hiltrudia kusmici (Clessin, 1887)
- Monacha cartusiana (O. F. Müller, 1774)
- Monacha parumcincta (L. Pfeiffer, 1847)

Helicidae

- Campylaea pouzolzi (Deshayes, 1830)
- Cornu aspersum (O. F. Müller, 1774)
- Helix secernenda Rossmässler, 1847
- Liburnica setigera setigera (Rossmässler, 1836)
- Liburnica hoffmanni hoffmanni (Rossmässler, 1836)

== Bivalvia ==
Sphaeriidae

- Euglesa casertana (Poli, 1791)
- Pisidium personatum Malm, 1855

== See also ==
- List of marine molluscs of Croatia

Lists of molluscs of surrounding countries:

- List of non-marine molluscs of Italy (marine border)
