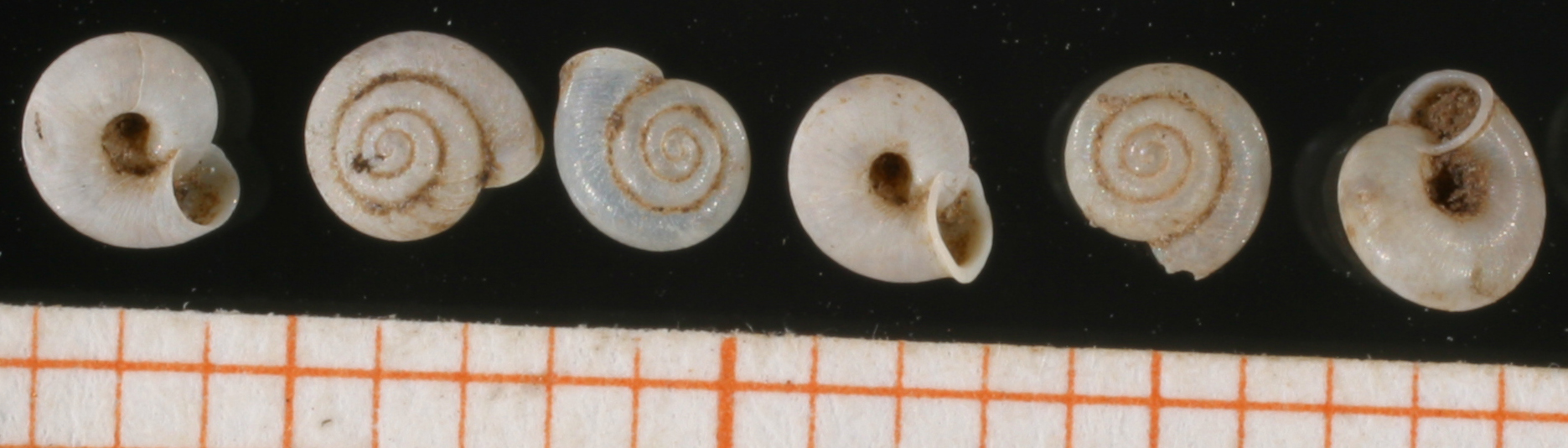

Conservation status
- Near Threatened (IUCN 3.1)

Scientific classification
- Kingdom: Animalia
- Phylum: Mollusca
- Class: Gastropoda
- Order: Stylommatophora
- Family: Valloniidae
- Genus: Vallonia
- Species: V. declivis

Binomial name
- Vallonia declivis Sterki, 1892

Synonyms
- Vallonia adela Westerlund, 1881

= Vallonia declivis =

Species of gastropod

Vallonia declivis is a species of very small air-breathing land snail, a terrestrial pulmonate gastropod mollusk in the family Valloniidae.

== Distribution ==
This species is found in Austria, France, Germany, Poland, and Switzerland. It was previously listed as part of the fauna of Slovakia, but Čejka considered its occurrence in Slovakia unlikely. It lives also in the Czech Republic (in Bohemia only) and in Slovakia.
