= Vallonia cyclophorella =

Conservation status
- Secure (NatureServe)

Scientific classification
- Kingdom: Animalia
- Phylum: Mollusca
- Class: Gastropoda
- Order: Stylommatophora
- Family: Valloniidae
- Genus: Vallonia
- Species: V. cyclophorella

Binomial name
- Vallonia cyclophorella Sterki, 1892

Species of gastropod

Vallonia cyclophorella, common name the silky vallonia, is a species of very small air-breathing land snail, a terrestrial pulmonate gastropod mollusk in the family Valloniidae.

== Distribution ==
This species occurs in areas including:

America:

- British Columbia in Canada
- Montana
