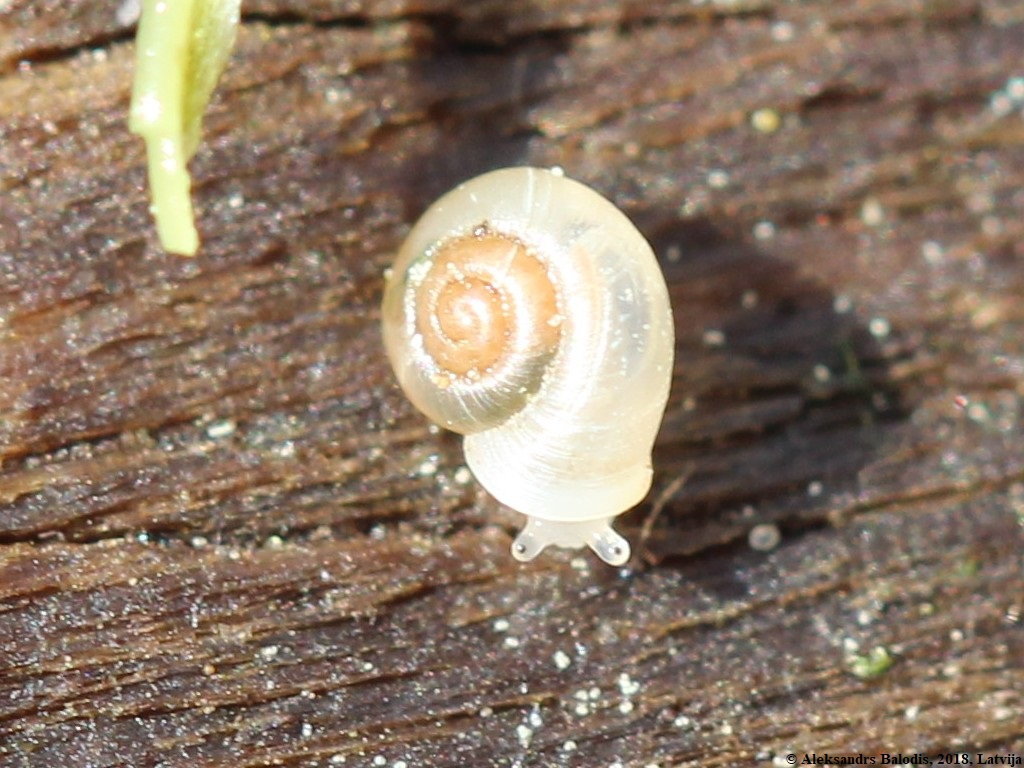

Conservation status
- Secure (NatureServe)

Scientific classification
- Kingdom: Animalia
- Phylum: Mollusca
- Class: Gastropoda
- Order: Stylommatophora
- Family: Valloniidae
- Genus: Vallonia
- Species: V. excentrica

Binomial name
- Vallonia excentrica Sterki, 1893

Synonyms
- Vallonia (Vallonia) excentrica Sterki, 1893

= Vallonia excentrica =

Species of gastropod

Vallonia excentrica, common name the eccentric vallonia, is a species of very small air-breathing land snail, a terrestrial pulmonate gastropod mollusk in the family Valloniidae.

== Distribution ==
This species has a Holarctic distribution and has been introduced elsewhere. Its occurrence includes:

Africa

- Saint Helena

Europe

- Great Britain
- Ireland
- Czech Republic
- Ukraine

Australia

- Introduced to south-eastern Australia as well as Lord Howe Island and Norfolk Island.

North America

- British Columbia in Canada
