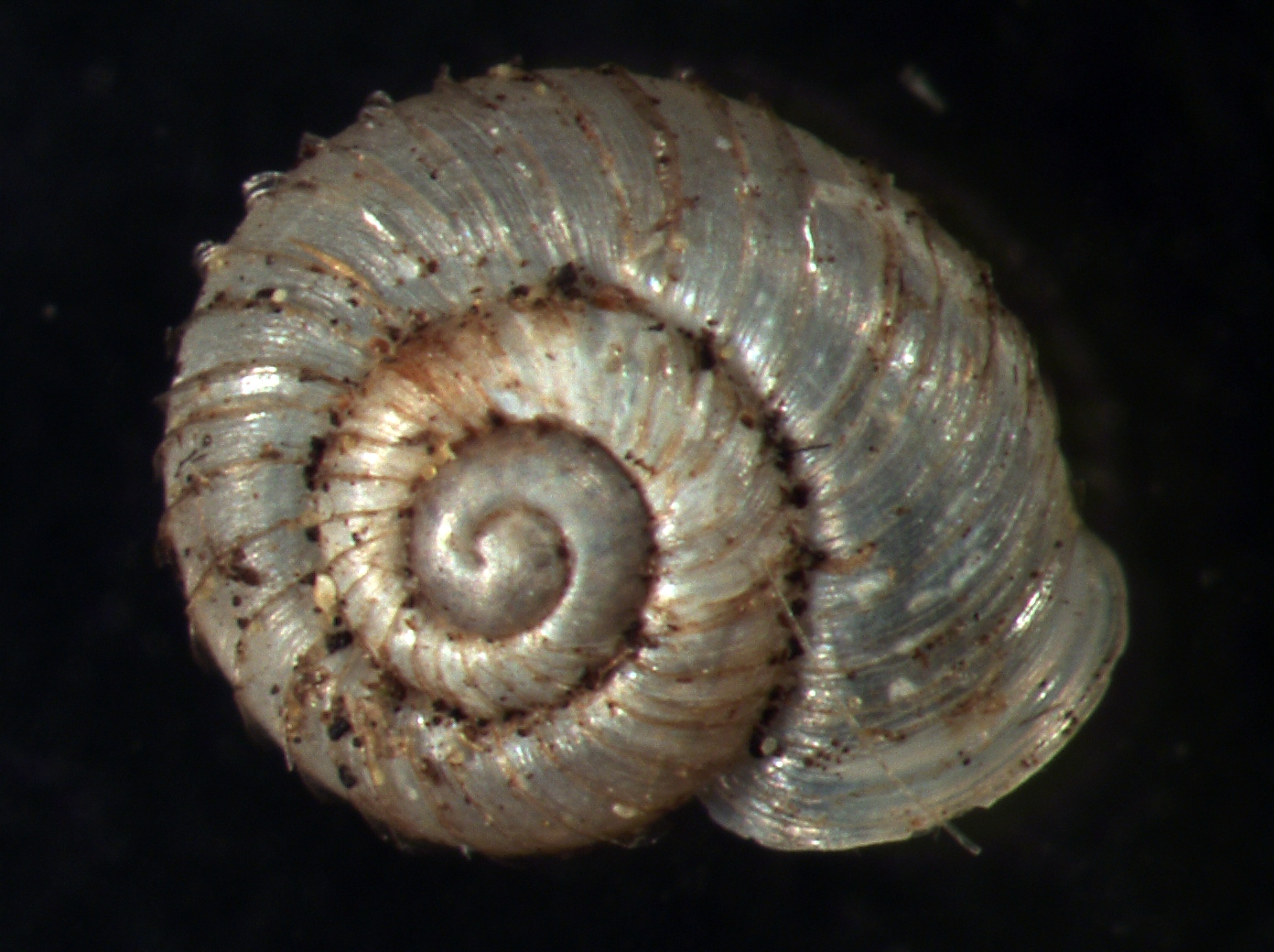
- Apical view of a shell of Vallonia costata
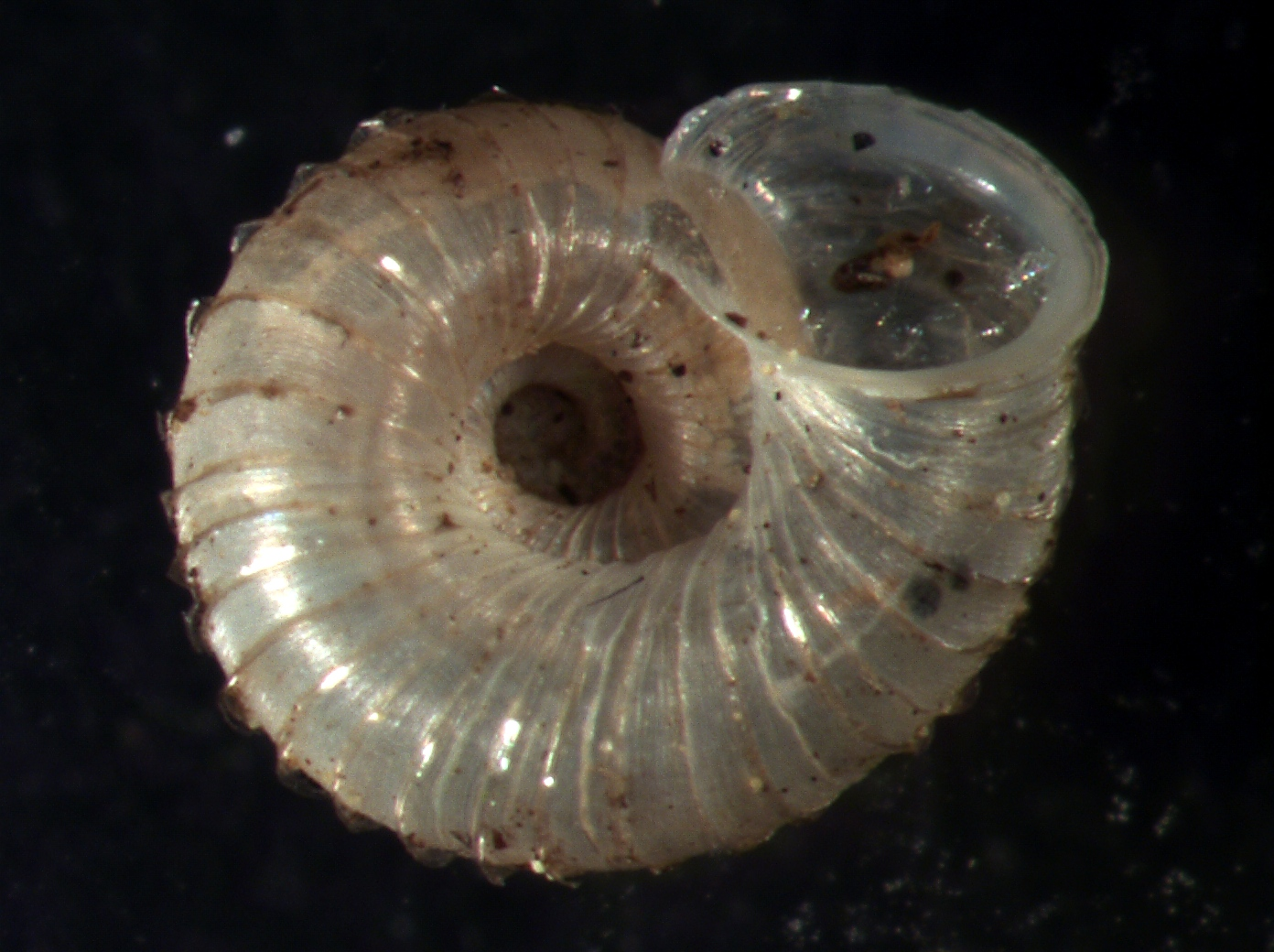
- Basal view of a shell of Vallonia costata

Conservation status
- Secure (NatureServe)

Scientific classification
- Kingdom: Animalia
- Phylum: Mollusca
- Class: Gastropoda
- Order: Stylommatophora
- Family: Valloniidae
- Genus: Vallonia
- Species: V. costata

Binomial name
- Vallonia costata (O. F. Müller, 1774)

Synonyms
- Helix (Vallonia) brochoni Degrange-Touzin, 1893; Helix (Vallonia) costata O. F. Müller, 1774; Helix (Vallonia) costata f. cyclostoma Westerlund, 1881; † Helix (Vallonia) costellata F. Sandberger, 1873 · unaccepted; Helix costata O. F. Müller, 1774; Helix crenella Montagu, 1803; † Helix pulchella var. costellata F. Sandberger, 1873 junior subjective synonym; Turbo helicinus [Lightfoot], 1786; Vallonia (Vallonia) costata (O. F. Müller, 1774); Vallonia costata var. helvetica Sterki, 1893; Vallonia costata var. pyrenaica Sterki, 1893; Vallonia costataeformis Jooss, 1912 (junior subjective synonym); Vallonia jurassica Geyer, 1908; Vallonia pulchella var. costata (O. F. Müller, 1774) superseded combination; Vallonia rosalia Risso, 1826

= Vallonia costata =

Species of gastropod

Vallonia costata is a species of small air-breathing land snail, a terrestrial pulmonate gastropod mollusk in the family Valloniidae.

== Description ==
For terms, see gastropod shell

The 1.1-1.6 x 2.2-2.7 mm shell has 3.2-3.3 whorls. Whorls are slightly angular at the periphery with deep sutures. The shell is flat with regular and widely spaced ribs. The shell is striated between the ribs, the last whorl is descending. The almost circular aperture is oblique (inclined downwards) and in adult specimens broadly reflected. The lip is thickened and reflected. As in other Vallonia, the umbilicus is very wide. The shell is ivory-white. For differences from Vallonia pulchella see that species.

== Distribution ==
This species occurs in countries and islands including:

- Great Britain
- Ireland
- Czech Republic
- Slovakia
- Poland
- Netherlands
- Latvia
- Ukraine
- Canada and the United States
- and other areas
