= Pupisoma evada =

Scientific classification
- Domain: Eukaryota
- Kingdom: Animalia
- Phylum: Mollusca
- Class: Gastropoda
- Order: Stylommatophora
- Superfamily: Pupilloidea
- Family: Valloniidae
- Genus: Pupisoma
- Species: P. laevis

Binomial name
- Pupisoma laevis (Iredale, 1944)

Synonyms
- Imputegla evada Iredale, 1944; Imputegla perrita Iredale, 1945

Species of land snail

Pupisoma evada is a tiny species of land snail that is native to eastern Australia.

== Description ==
The depressedly turbinate shell of the mature snail is 1.1–1.2 mm in height, with a diameter of 1.3 mm. It is pale golden-brown in colour. The whorls are shouldered. The sutures are strongly impressed, with fine, irregular radial ribs, with periostracal spines at the shell periphery. It has a circular aperture with a thin lip, and a closed umbilicus.

== Distribution and habitat ==
The snail is found along the coast of eastern Australia from southern New South Wales to southern Queensland, as well as on Lord Howe Island in the Tasman Sea, living in subtropical rainforest and dry vine thickets in trees and shrubs.
