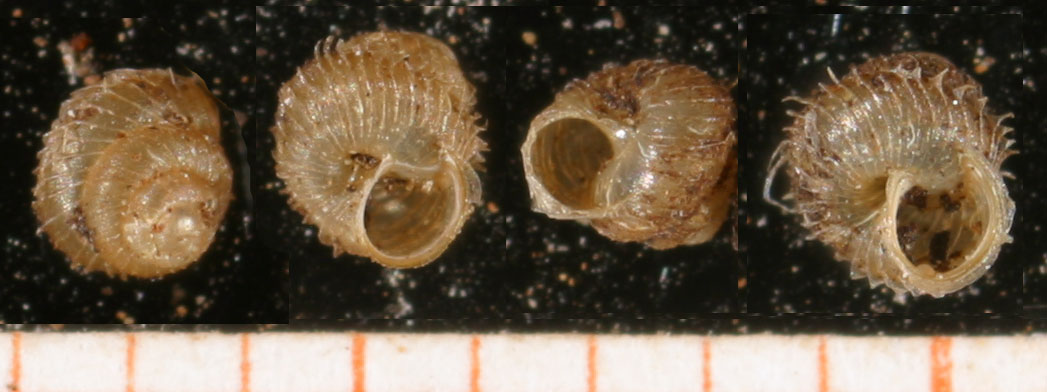
- Four shells of Acanthinula aculeata

Scientific classification
- Kingdom: Animalia
- Phylum: Mollusca
- Class: Gastropoda
- Order: Stylommatophora
- Superfamily: Pupilloidea
- Family: Valloniidae
- Subfamily: Acanthinulinae
- Genus: Acanthinula; Beck, 1847

Synonyms
- Aulaca Westerlund, 1903 junior objective synonym; Helix (Acanthinula) H. Beck, 1847 (original rank); Helix (Aculeatiana) Caziot, 1910 junior objective synonym; Helix (Euacanthinula) Westerlund, 1889 junior objective synonym

= Acanthinula =

Genus of gastropods

Acanthinula is a genus of minute, air-breathing land snails, terrestrial pulmonate gastropod mollusks or micromollusks in the family Valloniidae.

== Species ==
The genus Acanthinula contains the following species:

- Acanthinula aculeata (Müller, 1774) - type species
- † Acanthinula antonini (Michaud, 1862)
- † Acanthinula archiaci (de Boissy, 1848)
- † Acanthinula armoricensis (Cossmann, 1902)
- Acanthinula azorica Pilsbry, 1926 - Azorian prickly-snail
- † Acanthinula cenchridium (Cossmann, 1902)
- † Acanthinula clairi Schlickum & Truc, 1972
- † Acanthinula dumasi (de Boissy, 1848)
- Acanthinula expatriata Preston, 1911
- † Acanthinula geslini (de Boissy, 1848)
- † Acanthinula hesslerana Jooss, 1911
- † Acanthinula imperforata (K. Miller, 1907)
- † Acanthinula karsdorfensis Kadolsky, 2020
- † Acanthinula nanxiongensis W. Yu, H.-L. Gu & X.-Q. Zhang, 1990
- † Acanthinula paludinaeformis (F. Sandberger, 1858)
- † Acanthinula paronae (Sacco, 1887)
- Acanthinula peracanthoda (Bourguignat, 1883)
- † Acanthinula pygmaea (Simionescu & Barbu, 1940)
- Acanthinula spinifera Mousson, 1872
- † Acanthinula stampinensis (Deshayes, 1863)
- Acanthinula straeleni W. Adam, 1954
- † Acanthinula stueri (Cossmann, 1892)
- † Acanthinula sublabyrinthica (F. E. Edwards, 1852)
- † Acanthinula trochulus (F. Sandberger, 1872)
- † Acanthinula tuchoricensis (Klika, 1891)

== Synonyms ==
- Acanthinula granum Strebel & Pfeffer, 1879: synonym of Thysanophora granum (Strebel & Pfeffer, 1879) (original combination)
- Acanthinula harpa (Say, 1824): synonym of Zoogenetes harpa (Say, 1824) (superseded combination)
- Acanthinula membranacea Jickeli, 1873: synonym of Helix (Acanthinula) steudneri Jickeli, 1874: synonym of Sitala steudneri (Jickeli, 1874) (secondary homonym in Helix; Helix steudneri is a replacement name)
- † Acanthinula nana (A. Braun, 1851): synonym of † Esuinella nana (A. Braun, 1851) (superseded combination)
- Acanthinula perpusilla Möllendorff, 1897: synonym of Anaglyphula perpusilla (Möllendorff, 1897)
- † Acanthinula plicatella (Reuss, 1849): synonym of † Spermodea plicatella (Reuss, 1849) (superseded combination)
- Acanthinula raffrayi (Bourguignat, 1883): synonym of Acanthinula peracanthoda (Bourguignat, 1883) (name based on junior primary homonym)
- † Acanthinula stampiensis [sic]: synonym of † Acanthinula stampinensis (Deshayes, 1863) (misspelling)
- Acanthinula tiluana Möllendorff, 1897: synonym of Anaglyphula tiluana (Möllendorff, 1897) (original combination)
