= Vallonia terraenovae =

Conservation status
- Imperiled (NatureServe)

Scientific classification
- Kingdom: Animalia
- Phylum: Mollusca
- Class: Gastropoda
- Order: Stylommatophora
- Family: Valloniidae
- Genus: Vallonia
- Species: V. terraenovae

Binomial name
- Vallonia terraenovae Gerber, 1996

Species of gastropod

Vallonia terraenovae is a species of small, air-breathing land snail, a terrestrial pulmonate gastropod mollusk in the family Valloniidae.

It was described by Gerber in 1996.
