= Planogyra clappi =

Conservation status
- Apparently Secure (NatureServe)

Scientific classification
- Kingdom: Animalia
- Phylum: Mollusca
- Class: Gastropoda
- Order: Stylommatophora
- Family: Valloniidae
- Genus: Planogyra
- Species: P. clappi

Binomial name
- Planogyra clappi (Pilsbry, 1898)

Synonyms
- Punctum clappi Pilsbry, 1898

Species of gastropod

Planogyra clappi, commonly known as the western flat-whorl snail, is a species of gastropods belonging to the family Valloniidae. The species is found in Northern America.
