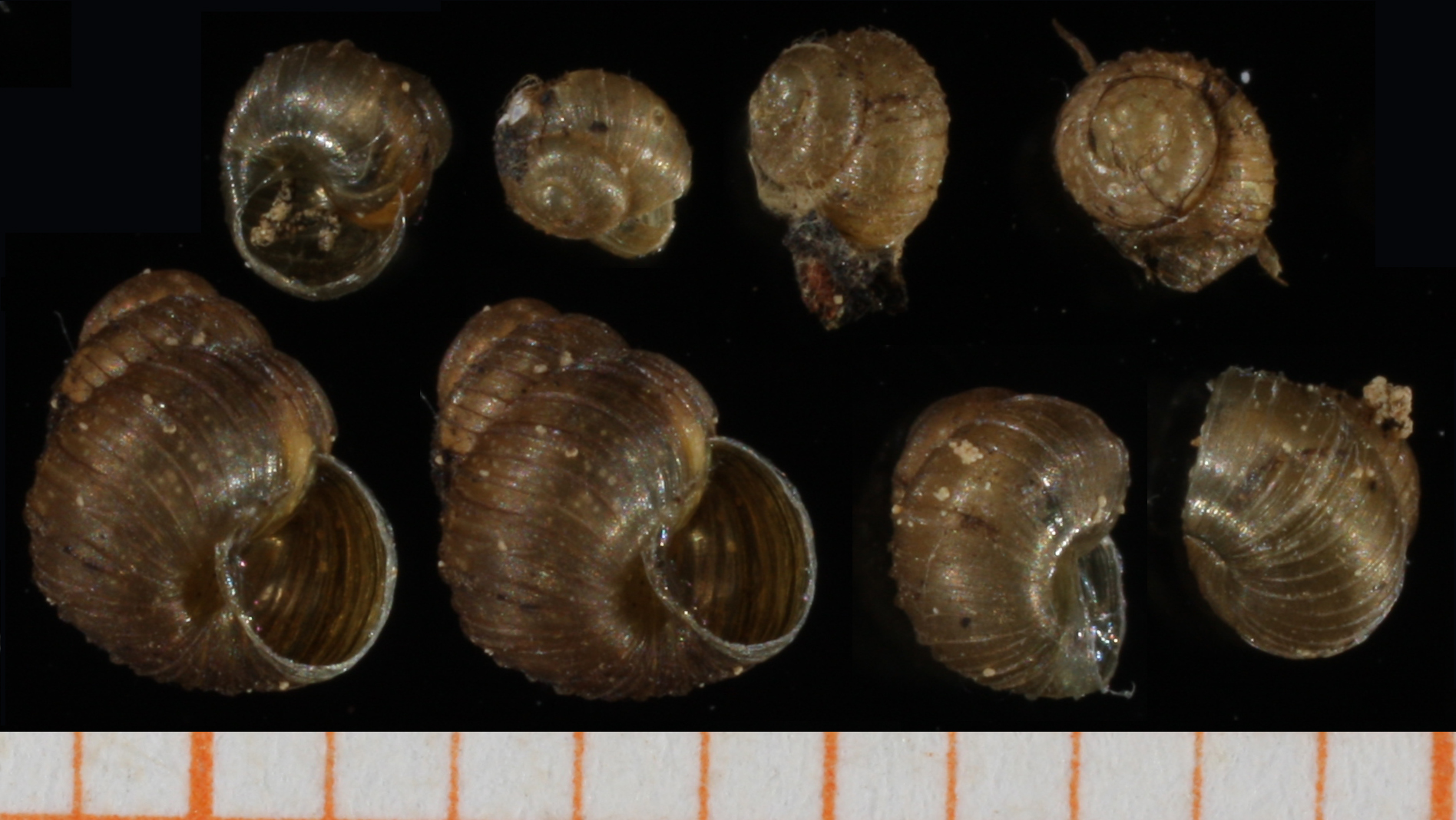

Conservation status
- Secure (NatureServe)

Scientific classification
- Kingdom: Animalia
- Phylum: Mollusca
- Class: Gastropoda
- Order: Stylommatophora
- Family: Valloniidae
- Genus: Zoogenetes
- Species: Z. harpa

Binomial name
- Zoogenetes harpa (Say, 1824)

= Boreal top =

Species of mollusc

The boreal top or boreal top snail (Zoogenetes harpa) is species of minute, air-breathing land snails, terrestrial pulmonate gastropod molluscs in the family Valloniidae.

Zoogenetes harpa occurs in the northern United States, across Canada, as well as in Scandinavia, the Swiss Alps, Russia, and Japan.

== Description, habitat, and status ==
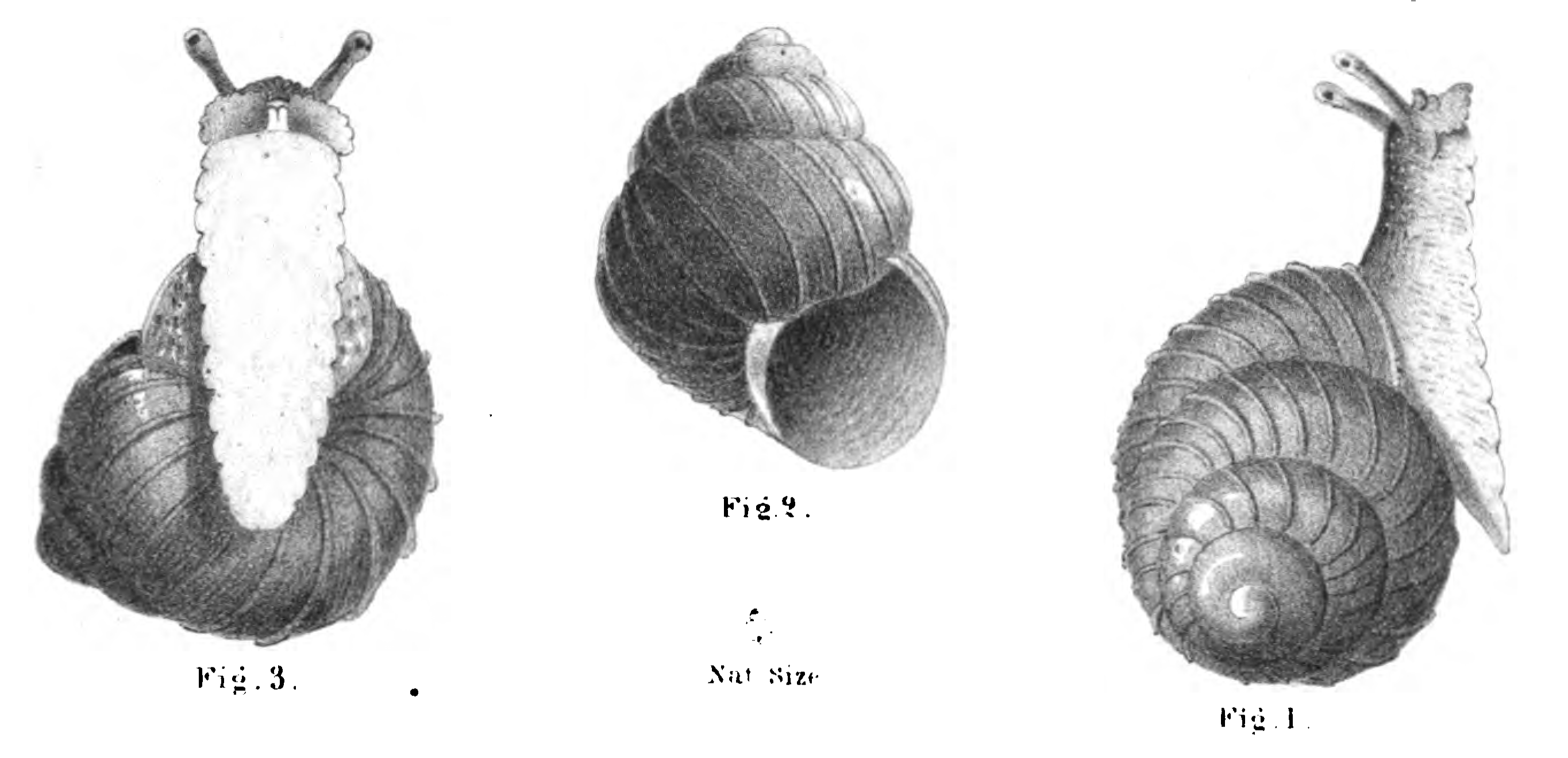
Three views of Zoogenetes harpa from Morse (1864)

The boreal top snail is species of minute, air-breathing land snails, terrestrial pulmonate gastropod molluscs in the family Valloniidae. They are generally about 4 millimetres (0.16 in) in length as an adult. It is the sole species in the genus Zoogenetes.

Its cone-shaped shell is reddish-brown, with ridges along the bottom spirals. Z. harpa is most active during fall and spring, when temperatures are more mild and moisture levels are higher. It lives on the bottom of logs and debris, often near or at the bottom of canyons with predominantly fir forests.

The snail is not considered generally endangered, though populations in some locations are considered threatened to varying degrees.

== Distribution ==
Zoogenetes harpa occurs in the northern United States and across Canada, and was discovered in the Uinta Mountains in northeastern Utah in April 2021, where it is now considered "likely native". It is also found in Scandinavia, Russia, the Swiss Alps, and Japan.

== Predators ==
Predators of Z. harpa include small mammals, insects, and birds such as wild turkeys and grouse.
