= Acanthinula spinifera =

Conservation status
- Vulnerable (IUCN 3.1)

Scientific classification
- Kingdom: Animalia
- Phylum: Mollusca
- Class: Gastropoda
- Order: Stylommatophora
- Family: Valloniidae
- Genus: Acanthinula
- Species: A. spinifera

Binomial name
- Acanthinula spinifera Mousson, 1872

Species of gastropod

Acanthinula spinifera is a species of small air-breathing land snail in the family Valloniidae. It is endemic to the Canary Islands.

This snail occurs on Tenerife and La Palma. Little is known about the species, but it is thought to be rare.
