= Planogyra asteriscus =

Eastern flat-whorl

Conservation status
- Apparently Secure (NatureServe)

Scientific classification
- Kingdom: Animalia
- Phylum: Mollusca
- Class: Gastropoda
- Order: Stylommatophora
- Family: Valloniidae
- Genus: Planogyra
- Species: P. asteriscus

Binomial name
- Planogyra asteriscus (Morse, 1857)

Species of gastropod

Planogyra astericus, common name the eastern flat-whorl, is a species of small air-breathing land snail, a terrestrial pulmonate gastropod mollusk in the family Valloniidae.

This species is listed as of special concern in the U.S. state of Michigan.
