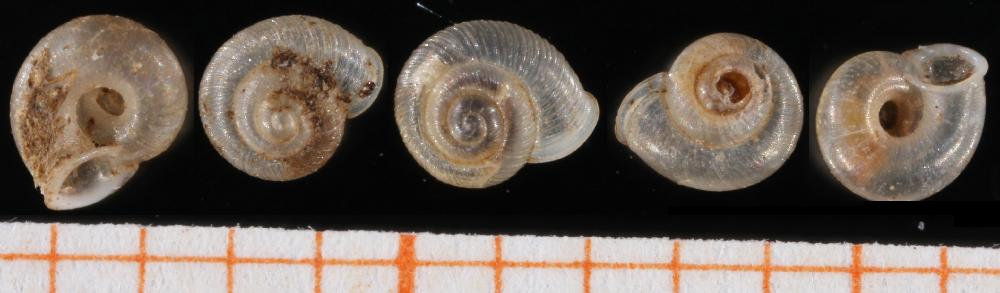

Conservation status
- Data Deficient (IUCN 2.3)

Scientific classification
- Kingdom: Animalia
- Phylum: Mollusca
- Class: Gastropoda
- Order: Stylommatophora
- Family: Valloniidae
- Genus: Vallonia
- Species: V. enniensis

Binomial name
- Vallonia enniensis (Gredler, 1856)

Synonyms
- Helix pulchella var. enniensis Gredler, 1856 (original combination and rank)

= Vallonia enniensis =

Species of gastropod

Vallonia enniensis is a species of small land snail, a terrestrial pulmonate gastropod mollusk or micromollusk in the family Valloniidae.

== Distribution ==
The distribution of this species is central-European and southern-European.

It is found in Austria, Belgium, the Czech Republic, France, Germany, Greece, Hungary, Italy, Poland, Romania, Russia, Slovakia, Spain, Switzerland, and the Ukraine.
