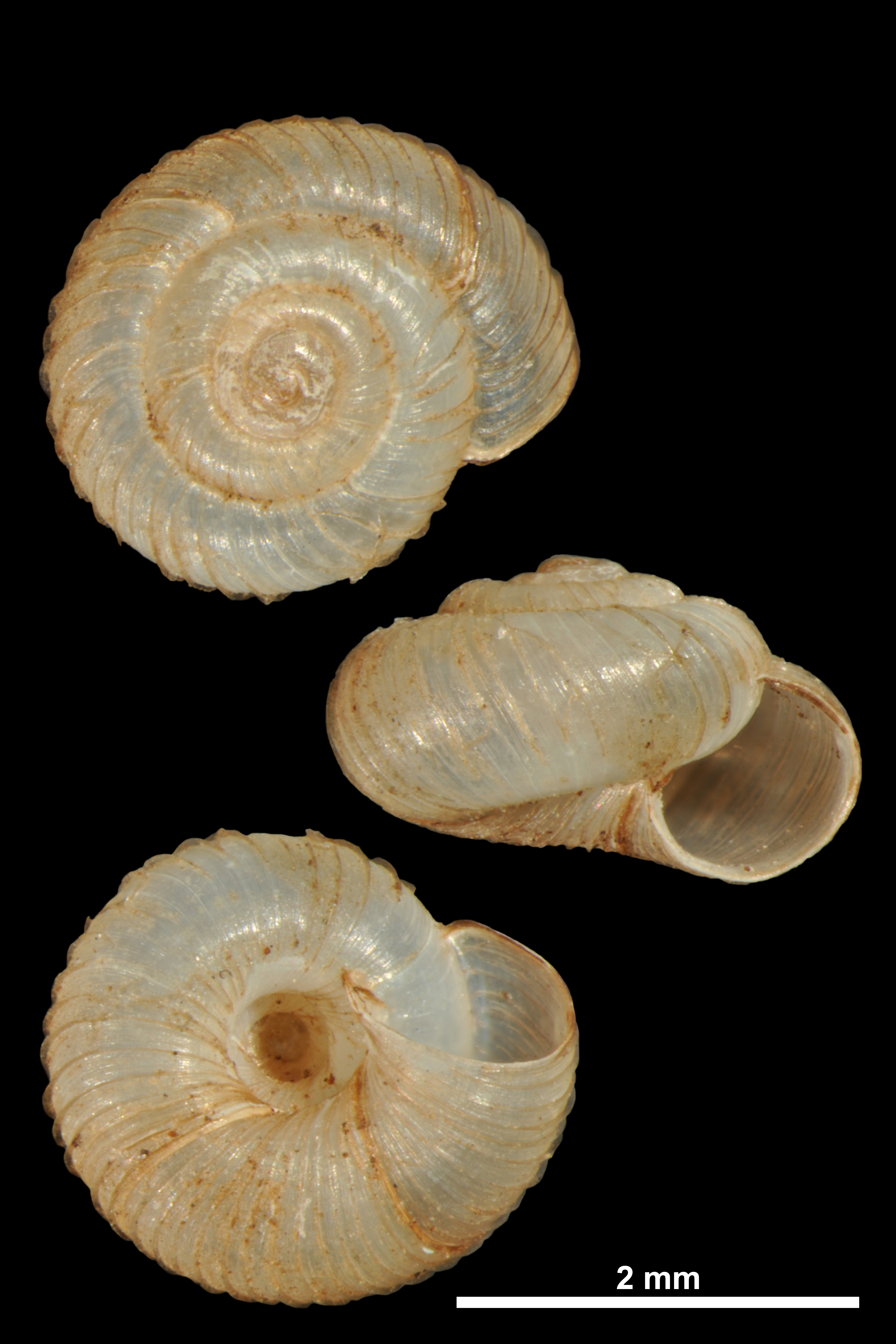
- Shell of Gittenbergia sororcula (speciemn at MNHN, Paris)

Scientific classification
- Kingdom: Animalia
- Phylum: Mollusca
- Class: Gastropoda
- Order: Stylommatophora
- Superfamily: Pupilloidea
- Family: Valloniidae
- Genus: Gittenbergia; Giusti, Castagnoli & Manganelli, 1985

= Gittenbergia =

Genus of gastropods

Gittenbergia is a genus of small air-breathing land snails, terrestrial pulmonate gastropod mollusks in the family Valloniidae.

== Species ==
Species within the genus Gittenbergia include:

- Gittenbergia sororcula (Benoit, 1859)
