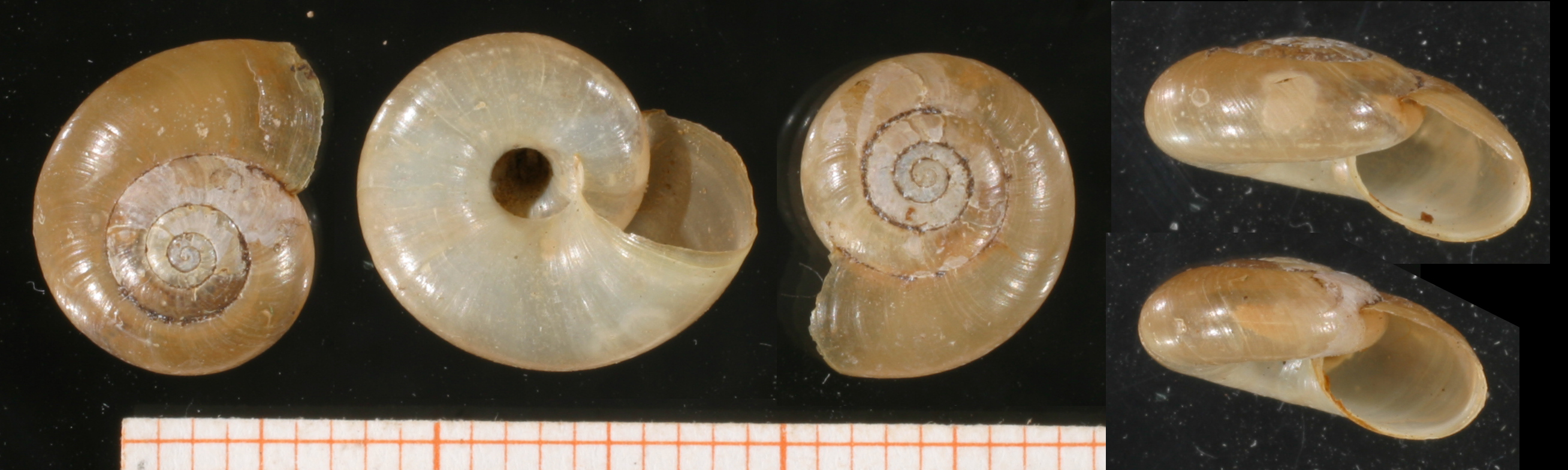
- Aegopinella ressmanni shells

Scientific classification
- Kingdom: Animalia
- Phylum: Mollusca
- Class: Gastropoda
- Order: Stylommatophora
- Family: Gastrodontidae
- Genus: Aegopinella
- Species: A. ressmanni

Binomial name
- Aegopinella ressmanni (Westerlund, 1883)
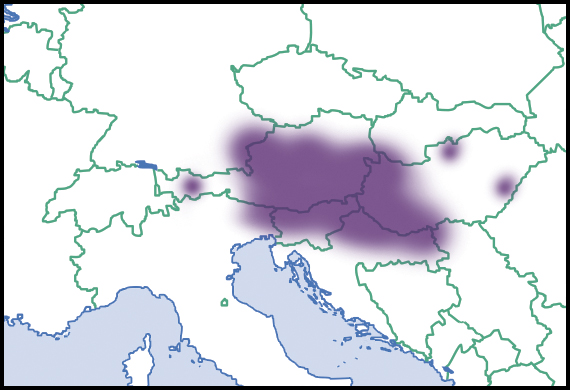

Synonyms
- Hyalinia nitens var. ressmanni Westerlund, 1883 (basionym)

= Aegopinella ressmanni =

Species of gastropod

Aegopinella ressmanni is a small species of land snail in the terrestrial pulmonate gastropod mollusk family Gastrodontidae, the glass snails.

== Description ==
It is characterized by having a larger shell than other Aegopinella species: its diameter attains 15 mm (0.6 in), its height 8 mm (0.3 in).

(Original description in Latin) The shell is more convex, with the body whorl swelling towards the front near the large aperture. The columellar margin is sufficiently arched.

== Distribution ==
The species is distributed in Austria, Czechia, Croatia, Germany, Hungary, Italy, and Slovenia.
