= Argna ferrari =

Scientific classification
- Domain: Eukaryota
- Kingdom: Animalia
- Phylum: Mollusca
- Class: Gastropoda
- Order: Stylommatophora
- Family: Argnidae
- Genus: Argna
- Species: A. ferrari

Binomial name
- Argna ferrari (Porro, 1838)

Species of gastropod

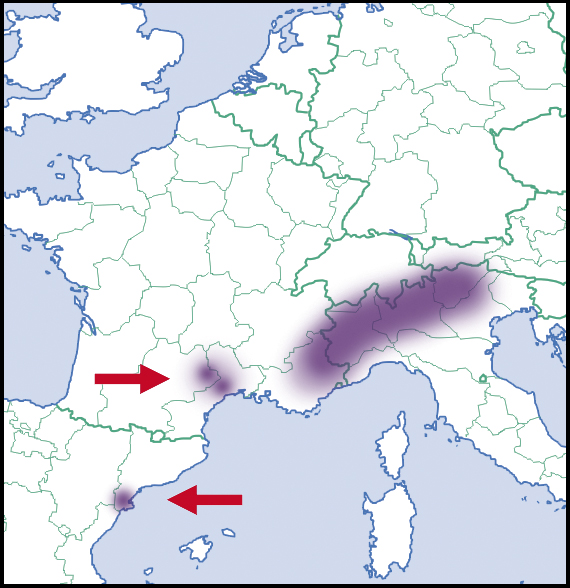
Native range

Argna ferrari is a species of gastropod belonging to the family Argnidae.

The species is found in South Europe.
