= Agardhiella =

Agardhiella may refer to:

- Agardhiella (gastropod), a genus of gastropods in the family Argnidae
- Agardhiella (alga), a genus of algae in the family Solieriaceae
