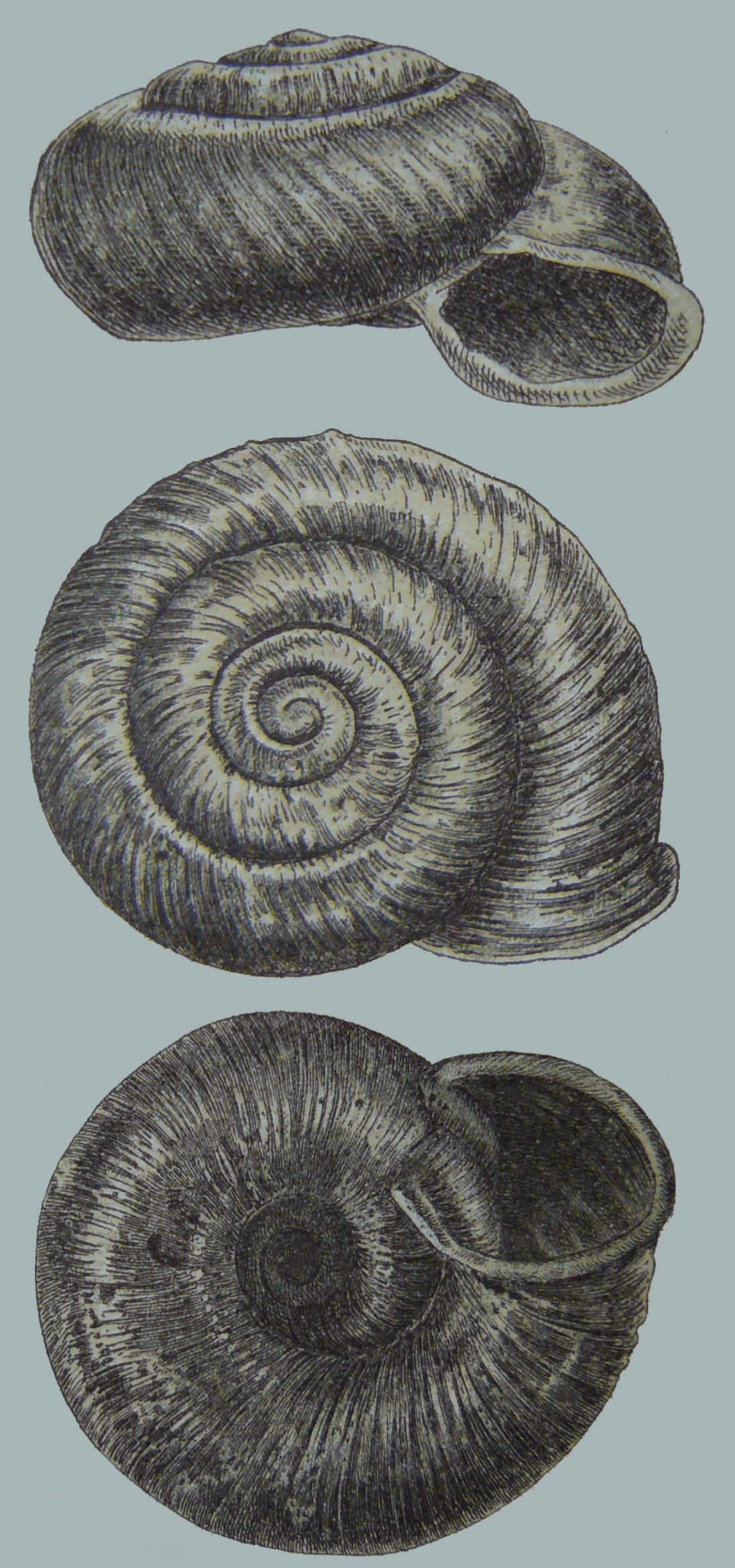
- Drawing: three views of a shell of Vallonia tenuilabris

Scientific classification
- Domain: Eukaryota
- Kingdom: Animalia
- Phylum: Mollusca
- Class: Gastropoda
- Order: Stylommatophora
- Family: Valloniidae
- Genus: Vallonia
- Species: V. tenuilabris

Binomial name
- Vallonia tenuilabris (A.Braun, 1843)

Synonyms
- Helix pulchella var. tenuilabris Braun, 1843

= Vallonia tenuilabris =

Species of gastropod

Vallonia tenuilabris is a species of very small, air-breathing land snail that is a terrestrial pulmonate gastropod mollusk or micromollusk in the family Valloniidae.

== Distribution ==
Vallonia tenuilabris was described for the first time in the loess of Wiesbaden, Germany. It is only in the past few decades that its recent occurrence in Central Asia has been recognised.

Recent distribution of Vallonia tenuilabris include:

- Central Asian highlands (Altai Mountains, Tien Shan, Pamir Mountains and Himalayas)
- Northern Mongolia
- from the Baikal region into Northern Asia, from Siberia to Altai, Karakorum and Yenisei.
- North-eastern and north China including Xinjiang and Tibet.
- Northern Caucasus - the most western part of the recent range.

== Description ==
The width of the shell is 3 mm. The height of the shell is 1.8 mm.

== Ecology ==
Vallonia tenuilabris is adapted to the cold.
