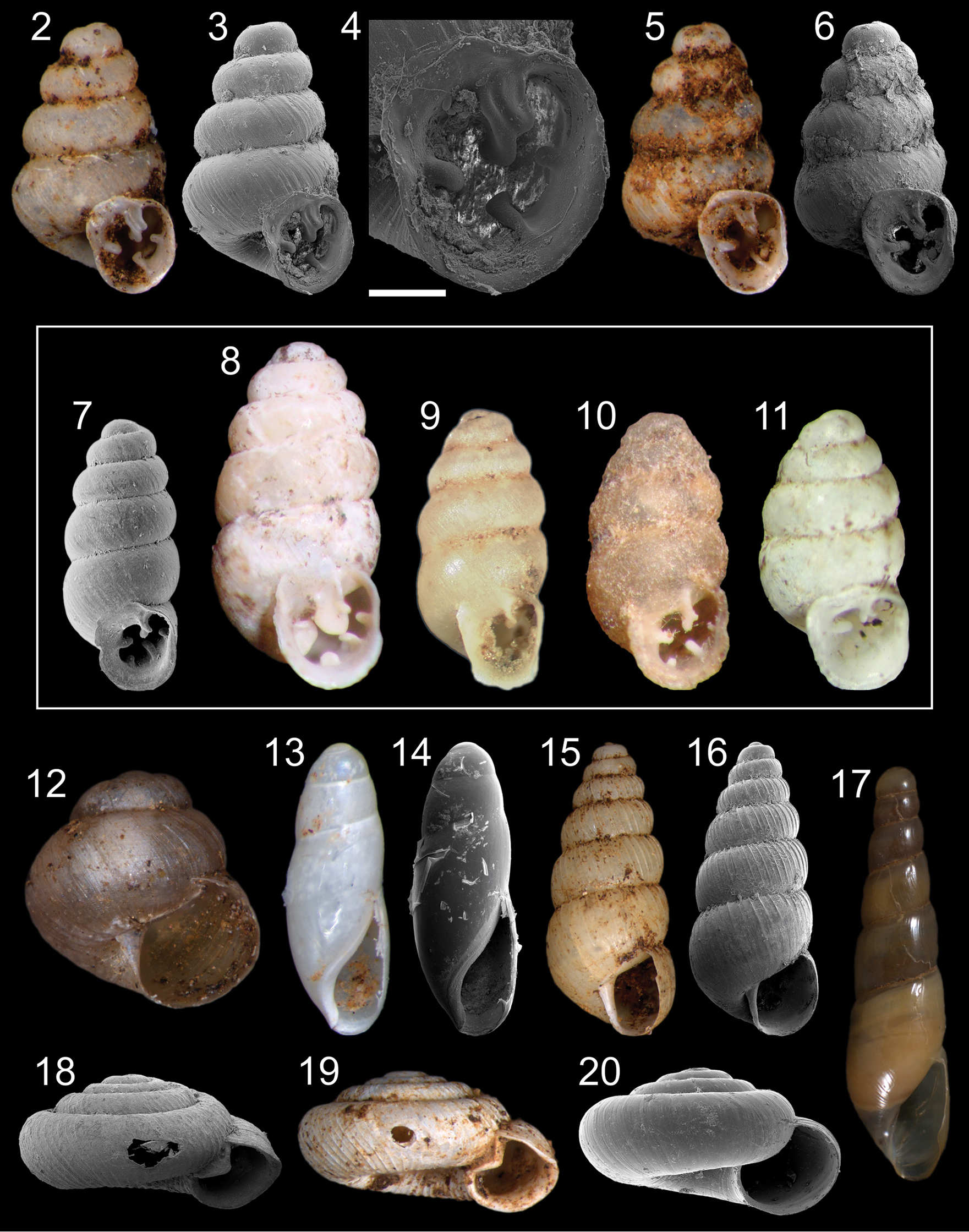
- Specimen 12: Pupisoma dioscoricola

Conservation status
- Least Concern (IUCN 2.3)

- Vulnerable (NatureServe)

Scientific classification
- Kingdom: Animalia
- Phylum: Mollusca
- Class: Gastropoda
- Order: Stylommatophora
- Family: Valloniidae
- Genus: Pupisoma
- Species: P. dioscoricola

Binomial name
- Pupisoma dioscoricola (Adams, 1845)

Synonyms
- Helix (Microconus) caeca Guppy, 1868 (junior synonym); Helix caeca Guppy, 1868; Helix dioscoricola C. B. Adams, 1845 (original combination); Helix orcula Benson, 1850 (original combination); Helix punctum Morelet, 1851; Parazoogenetes orcula (Benson, 1950) (superseded combination); Patula (Ptychopatula) caeca (Guppy, 1868) (junior synonym); Ptychopatula dioscoricola (C. B. Adams, 1845); Ptychopatula orcula (Benson, 1850); Pupisoma (Ptychopatula) dioscoricola (C. B. Adams, 1845)· accepted, alternate representation; Pupisoma (Ptychopatula) orcula (Benson, 1850)· accepted, alternate representation; Pupisoma orcula (Benson, 1850) (junior synonym); Pupisoma philippinicum Möllendorff, 1888 (junior synonym); Thysanophora caeca (Guppy, 1868); Thysanophora dioscoricola (C. B. Adams, 1845) (unaccepted combination); Thysanophora dioscoricola caeca (Guppy, 1868) (junior synonym)

= Pupisoma dioscoricola =

Species of gastropods

Pupisoma dioscoricola is a species of gastropods belonging to the family Valloniidae.

Subspecies:

- Pupisoma dioscoricola dioscoricola (C. B. Adams, 1845)
- Pupisoma dioscoricola insigne Pilsbry, 1920

== Distribution ==
The species has almost cosmopolitan distribution. This species occurs in the United States of America (Florida and Texas) to south Brazil and north Argentina. Some of this distribution could be anthropogenic (Hausdsdorf 2007). It is also found in Micronesia, but one broken specimen was found in Afghanistan in 1979.

Its natural habitats are temperate forests and subtropical or tropical dry shrubland. It is threatened by habitat loss.
