= Vallonia gracilicosta =

Conservation status
- Secure (NatureServe)

Scientific classification
- Kingdom: Animalia
- Phylum: Mollusca
- Class: Gastropoda
- Order: Stylommatophora
- Family: Valloniidae
- Genus: Vallonia
- Species: V. gracilicosta

Binomial name
- Vallonia gracilicosta (Reinhardt, 1883)

Synonyms
- Vallonia sonorana Pilsbry, 1915

Species of gastropod

Vallonia gracilicosta, common name the multirib vallonia or multiribbed vallonia, is a species of very small, air-breathing land snail, a terrestrial pulmonate gastropod mollusk in the family Valloniidae.

== Subspecies ==
The subspecies, Vallonia gracilicosta albula, is an endangered species in the U.S. State of Michigan.

== Distribution ==
This species occurs in:

- Canada: Alberta, British Columbia, Manitoba, Newfoundland Island, Nunavut, Ontario and Quebec.
- United States of America: Arizona, California, Colorado, Idaho, Illinois, Indiana, Iowa, Kansas, Kentucky, Maine, Massachusetts, Michigan, Minnesota, Missouri, Montana, Nebraska, New Mexico, New York, North Dakota, Oklahoma, Rhode Island, South Dakota, Texas, Utah, Wisconsin and Wyoming.
