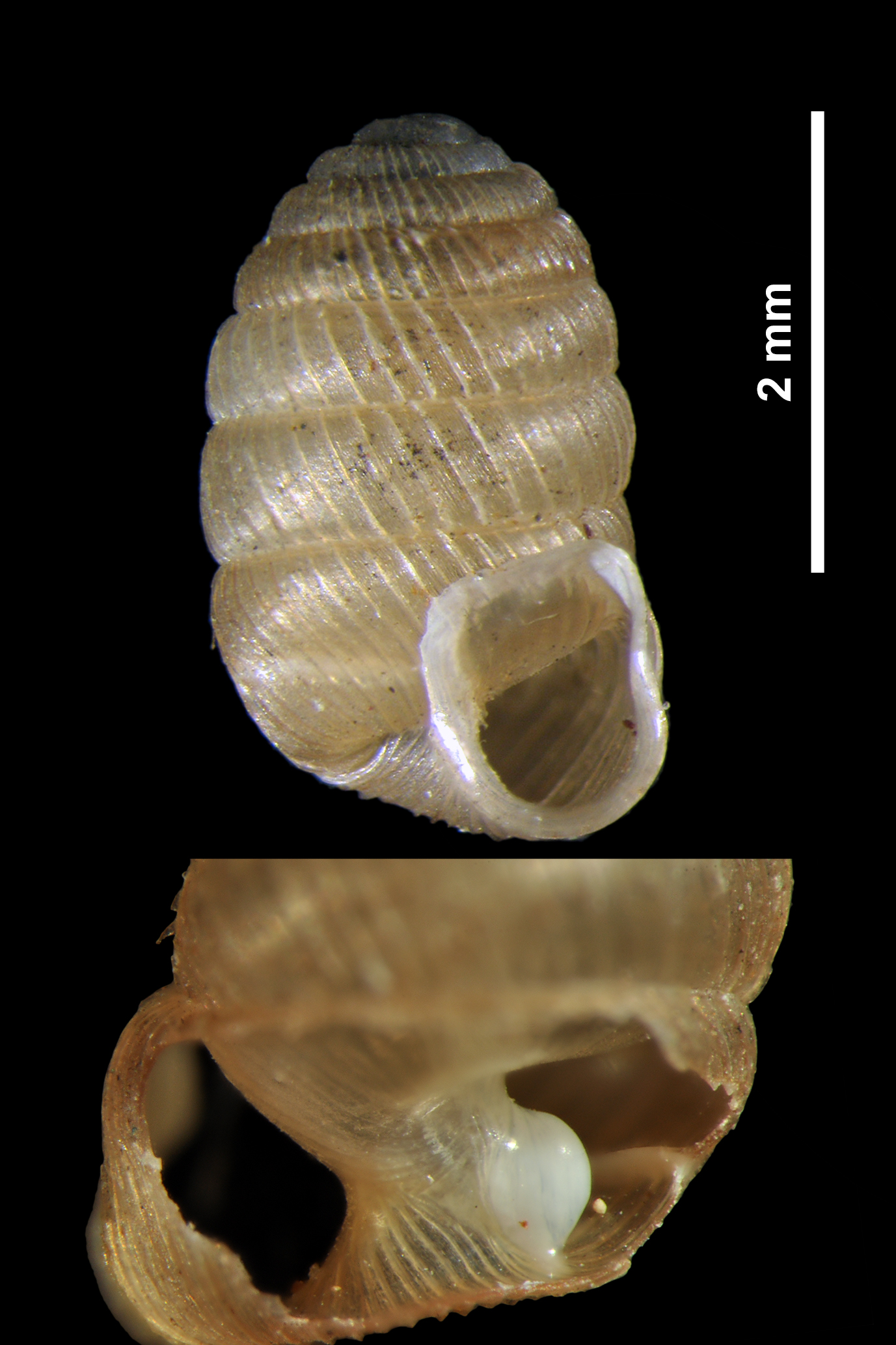
- Pagodulina pagodula pagodula shell (specimen at MNHN, Paris)

Scientific classification
- Kingdom: Animalia
- Phylum: Mollusca
- Class: Gastropoda
- Order: Stylommatophora
- Family: Pagodulinidae
- Genus: Pagodulina
- Species: P. pagodula

Binomial name
- Pagodulina pagodula (Des Moulins, 1830)

= Pagodulina pagodula =

Species of gastropod

Pagodulina pagodula is a species of minute land snail, a terrestrial pulmonate gastropod mollusk, or micromollusk, in the family Pagodulinidae, and the superfamily Pupilloidea.

Pagodulina pagodula is the type species of the genus Pagodulina.

Subspecies

- Pagodulina pagodula altilis Klemm, 1939
- Pagodulina pagodula pagodula (Des Moulins, 1830)
- Pagodulina pagodula principalis Klemm, 1939

The genus and the species name both mean little pagoda, a reference to the shape of the shell.

Synonyms

- Pagodulina pagodula sparsa Pilsbry, 1924: synonym of Pagodulina sparsa Pilsbry, 1924 (basionym)
- Pagodulina pagodula var. subdola Gredler, 1856: synonym of Pagodulina subdola (Gredler, 1856) (original combination and rank)

== Shell description ==
The shells of this snail species are minute, about 3 mm in height, barrel-shaped or skep-shaped, with a flared and somewhat ear-shaped aperture.

== Distribution ==
The distribution of this species is Alpine. It occurs in the following countries:

- Poland – critically endangered in southern Poland
- Slovakia
