= Argna bielzi =

Scientific classification
- Kingdom: Animalia
- Phylum: Mollusca
- Class: Gastropoda
- Order: Stylommatophora
- Family: Argnidae
- Genus: Argna
- Species: A. bielzi

Binomial name
- Argna bielzi (Rossmässler, 1859)

Species of gastropod

Argna bielzi is a species of air-breathing land snail, a terrestrial pulmonate gastropod mollusk in the family Argnidae.

== Distribution ==
This species occurs in Slovakia, Ukraine and other countries.
