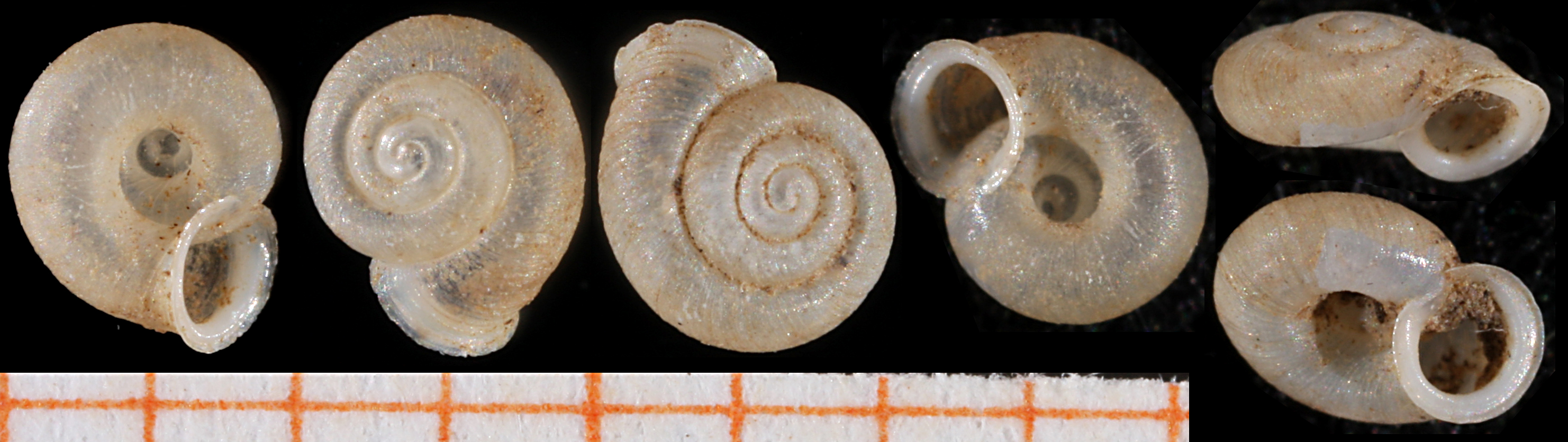

Conservation status
- Endangered (IUCN 3.1)

Scientific classification
- Kingdom: Animalia
- Phylum: Mollusca
- Class: Gastropoda
- Order: Stylommatophora
- Family: Valloniidae
- Genus: Vallonia
- Species: V. suevica

Binomial name
- Vallonia suevica Geyer, 1908

Synonyms
- Vallonia alamannica Geyer, 1908 (junior synonym)

= Vallonia suevica =

Species of small, air-breathing land snail

Vallonia suevica is a species of small, air-breathing land snail, a terrestrial, pulmonate gastropod mollusk in the family Valloniidae.

== Distribution ==
The distribution of this species includes Germany and Luxembourg. Its presence in Austria and in Italy is uncertain.

It was listed as a Data Deficient species in the 1996 IUCN Red List of Threatened Species.
