= Vallonia eiapopeia =

Scientific classification
- Kingdom: Animalia
- Phylum: Mollusca
- Class: Gastropoda
- Order: Stylommatophora
- Family: Valloniidae
- Genus: Vallonia
- Species: V. eiapopeia

Binomial name
- Vallonia eiapopeia Gerber, 1996

Species of gastropod

Vallonia eiapopeia is a species of small, air-breathing land snails, terrestrial pulmonate gastropod mollusks in the family Valloniidae.
