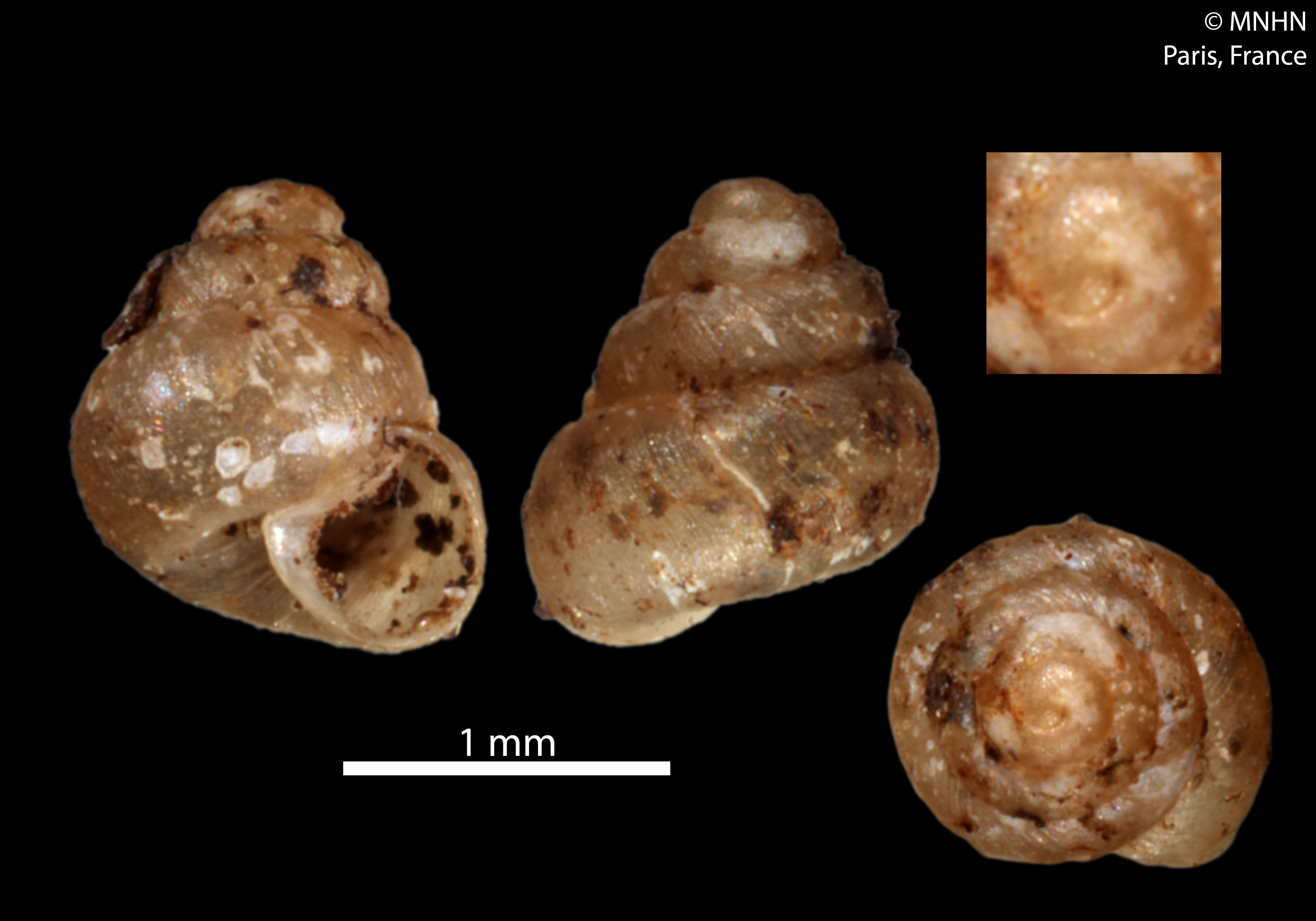
- Shell of Pupisoma vermeuleni (paratype at MNHN, Paris)

Scientific classification
- Kingdom: Animalia
- Phylum: Mollusca
- Class: Gastropoda
- Order: Stylommatophora
- Infraorder: Pupilloidei
- Superfamily: Pupilloidea
- Family: Valloniidae
- Genus: Pupisoma; Stoliczka 1873

Type species
- Pupa lignicola Stolizcka, 1871

Synonyms
- Imputegla Iredale, 1937; Parazoogenetes Habe, 1956; Patula (Ptychopatula) Pilsbry, 1889 (unaccepted combination); Ptychopatula Pilsbry, 1889; Pupa (Pupisoma) Stoliczka, 1873 (unaccepted rank); Pupisoma (Ptychopatula) Pilsbry, 1889· accepted, alternate representation; Pupisoma (Pupisoma) Stoliczka, 1873· accepted, alternate representation

= Pupisoma =

Genus of gastropods

Pupisoma is a genus of minute, air-breathing land snails, terrestrial pulmonate gastropod molluscs or micromollusks in the family Valloniidae.

Pupisoma is placed within Valloniidae because Pupisomatidae is considered to be a synonym of Valloniidae.

== Species ==
Species within the genus Pupisoma include:

- Pupisoma bailyi Pilsbry, 1934
- Pupisoma cacharicum Godwin-Austen, 1910
- Pupisoma circumlitum Hedley, 1897
- Pupisoma comicolense H. B. Baker, 1928
- Pupisoma costulata Hausdorf, 2007
- Pupisoma dioscoricola (C. B. Adams, 1845)
- † Pupisoma distans Falkner, 1974
- Pupisoma evada (Iredale, 1944)
- Pupisoma evezardi (Hanley & Theobald, 1874)
- Pupisoma gracile Haas, 1937
- Pupisoma hueense (Wattebled, 1886)
- Pupisoma japonicum Pilsbry, 1902
- Pupisoma lignicola (Stoliczka, 1871)
- Pupisoma longstaffae Godwin-Austen, 1910
- Pupisoma macneilli (Clapp, 1918)
- Pupisoma mauritiana W. Adam, 1954
- Pupisoma mediamericanum Pilsbry, 1920
- Pupisoma miccyla (Benson, 1860)
- Pupisoma microturbinata Stanisic, 2010
- Pupisoma misaliensis Gittenberger & van Bruggen, 2013
- Pupisoma moleculina (van Benthem Jutting, 1940)
- Pupisoma orcella (Stoliczka, 1873)
- Pupisoma pagodula Stanisic, 2010
- Pupisoma paroense E. Gittenberger & Leda, 2021
- Pupisoma perpusillum (Möllendorff, 1897)
- Pupisoma porti (Brazier, 1876)
- Pupisoma pulvisculum (Issel, 1874)
- Pupisoma renschi K. L. Pfeiffer, 1952
- Pupisoma solemi (Maassen, 2000)
- Pupisoma umbilicata B. Rensch, 1935
- Pupisoma vermeuleni (Maassen, 2000)
- Pupisoma vimontianum (Crosse, 1874)
- Pupisoma waterloti Fischer-Piette, Blanc, F. & Vukadinovic, 1974
- Pupisoma sp. nov. 1 from Nicaragua

Synonyms

- Pupisoma atens Hylton Scott, 1960: synonym of Pupisoma comicolense H. B. Baker, 1927 (junior synonym)
- Pupisoma bilamellatum van Benthem Jutting, 1958: synonym of Acmella bilamellata (van Benthem Jutting, 1958) (original combination)
- Pupisoma chytrophora (Mabille, 1887): synonym of Tonkinospira chytrophora (Mabille, 1887)
- Pupisoma constrictum (Godwin-Austen, 1895): synonym of Moderata constricta (Godwin-Austen, 1895) (unaccepted combination)
- Pupisoma evezerdi (Hanley & Theobald, 1874): synonym of Pupisoma evezardi (Hanley & Theobald, 1874) (incorrect subsequent spelling)
- Pupisoma galapagorum Pilsbry, 1934: synonym of Pupisoma comicolense H. B. Baker, 1927 (junior synonym)
- Pupisoma harpula (Reinhardt, 1886): synonym of Salpingoma harpula (Reinhardt, 1886)
- Pupisoma insigne Pilsbry, 1920: synonym of Pupisoma dioscoricola insigne Pilsbry, 1920 (unaccepted combination)
- Pupisoma longstaffi Godwin-Austen, 1910: synonym of Pupisoma longstaffae Godwin-Austen, 1910 (incorrect original spelling)
- Pupisoma michoacanensis Pilsbry, 1920: synonym of Pupisoma mediamericanum Pilsbry, 1920 (junior synonym)
- Pupisoma minus Pilsbry, 1920: synonym of Pupisoma macneilli (G. H. Clapp, 1918) (junior synonym)
- Pupisoma orcula (Benson, 1850): synonym of Pupisoma dioscoricola (C. B. Adams, 1845) (junior synonym)
- Pupisoma philippinicum Möllendorff, 1888: synonym of Pupisoma orcula (Benson, 1850): synonym of Pupisoma dioscoricola (C. B. Adams, 1845) (junior synonym)
- Pupisoma seriola (Benson, 1861): synonym of Pupilla seriola (Benson, 1861)
- Pupisoma steudneri (Jickeli, 1874): synonym of Sitala steudneri (Jickeli, 1874) (superseded combination)
- Pupisoma unilamellatum van Benthem Jutting, 1958: synonym of Acmella unilamellata (van Benthem Jutting, 1958) (original combination)
