= Agardhiella zoltanorum =

Conservation status
- Least Concern (IUCN 3.1)

Scientific classification
- Kingdom: Animalia
- Phylum: Mollusca
- Class: Gastropoda
- Order: Stylommatophora
- Family: Agardhiellidae
- Genus: Agardhiella
- Species: A. zoltanorum

Binomial name
- Agardhiella zoltanorum Subai, 2008

Species of gastropod

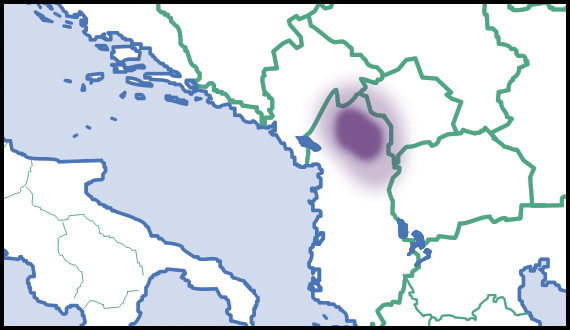
Native range of the species

Agardhiella zoltanorum is a species of gastropod belonging to the family Agardhiellidae.

== Distribution ==
The species is endemic to Albania.
