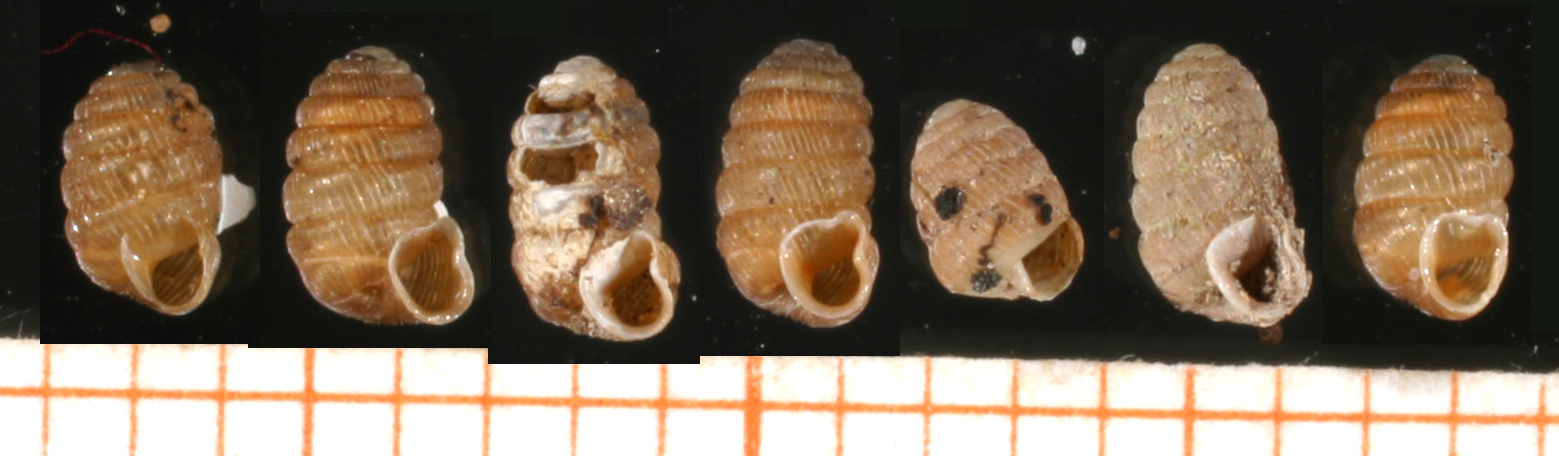
- Pagodulina pagodula shells

Scientific classification
- Kingdom: Animalia
- Phylum: Mollusca
- Class: Gastropoda
- Order: Stylommatophora
- Infraorder: Pupilloidei
- Superfamily: Pupilloidea
- Family: Pagodulinidae
- Genus: Pagodulina; Clessin, 1876

Synonyms
- Crystallifera Schileyko, 1976; Pagodina Stabile, 1864; Pagodinella Thiele, 1917; Pagodula P. Hesse, 1916

= Pagodulina =

Genus of gastropods

Pagodulina is a genus of very small air-breathing land snails, terrestrial pulmonate gastropod mollusks in the family Pagodulinidae.

== Species ==
- Pagodulina austeniana (G.Nevill, 1880)
- Pagodulina bellardii (Sacco, 1884)
- Pagodulina elegantissima A.Reischütz, P.L.Reischütz & W.Fischer, 2009
- Pagodulina epirotes Klemm, 1939
- Pagodulina hauseri E.Gittenberger, 1978
- Pagodulina kaeufeli Klemm, 1939
- Pagodulina klemmi E.Gittenberger & Subai, 1978
- Pagodulina lederi (O.Boettger, 1886)
- Pagodulina pagodula (Des Moulins, 1830) - the type species
- Pagodulina pisidica Schütt, 1993
- Pagodulina sparsa Pilsbry, 1924
- Pagodulina subdola (Gredler, 1856)
- Pagodulina tschapecki (Gredler, 1877)

Species brought into synonymy

- Pagodulina orientalis Hausdorf, 1996: synonym of Pagodulina subdola orientalis Hausdorf, 2006 (unaccepted rank)
