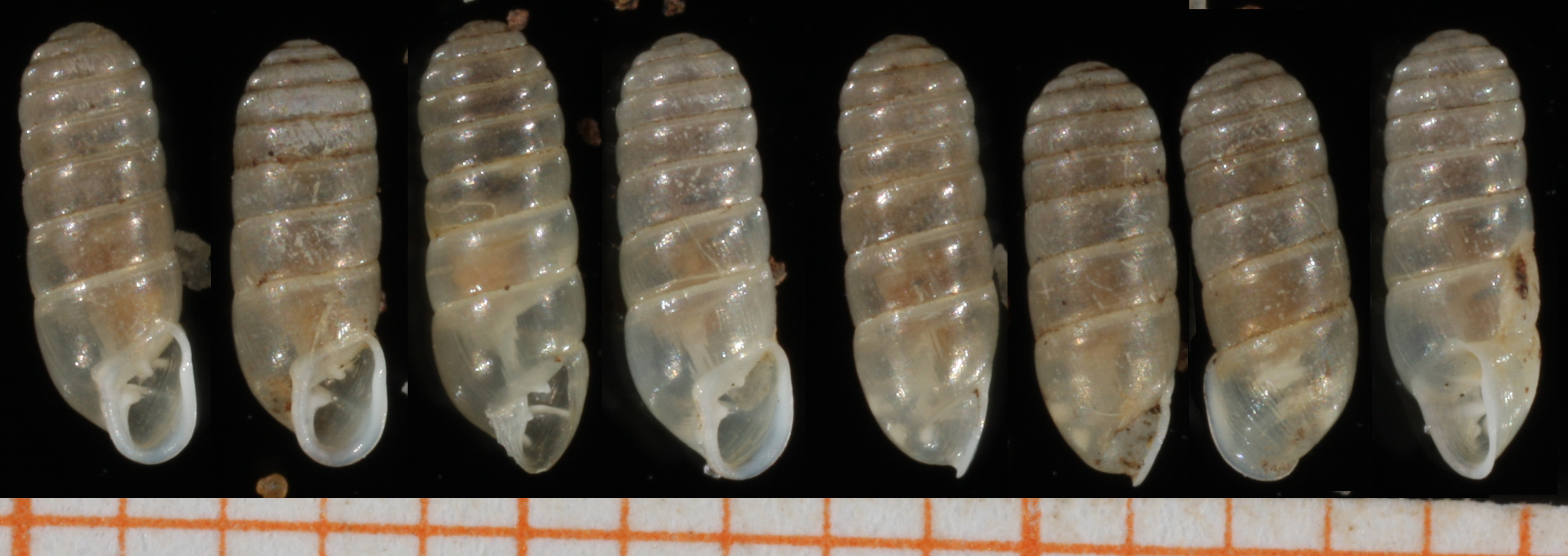
- Shells of Argna biplicata

Scientific classification
- Kingdom: Animalia
- Phylum: Mollusca
- Class: Gastropoda
- Order: Stylommatophora
- Family: Argnidae
- Genus: Argna
- Species: A. biplicata

Binomial name
- Argna biplicata (Michaud, 1831)

Synonyms
- Pupa biplicata Michaud, 1831

= Argna biplicata =

Species of gastropod

Argna biplicata is a species of air-breathing land snail, a terrestrial pulmonate gastropod mollusk in the family Argnidae.

Subspecies

- Argna biplicata biplicata (Michaud, 1831)
- Argna biplicata excessiva (Gredler, 1856)
- Argna biplicata ulterior Klemm, 1962

== Distribution ==
This species occurs in countries including:

- Austria
- France
- Italy
