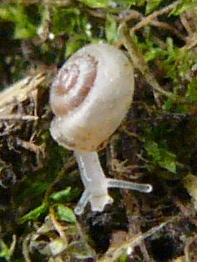
- A live individual of Vallonia pulchella

Scientific classification
- Kingdom: Animalia
- Phylum: Mollusca
- Class: Gastropoda
- Order: Stylommatophora
- Family: Valloniidae
- Genus: Vallonia; Risso, 1826

Type species
- Vallonia rosalia Risso, 1826

Synonyms
- Amplexis T. Brown, 1827; Circinaria H. Beck, 1837; † Discus (Nanopatula) Pfeffer, 1930; Helix (Circinaria) Beck, 1837 (junior synonym); Helix (Glaphyra) Albers, 1850 (Invalid: junior homonym of Glaphyra Newman, 1840 [Coleoptera]); Helix (Pulchelliana) Caziot, 1910 (Invalid: junior objective synonym of Circinaria Beck, 1837); Helix (Vallonia) Risso, 1826; Helix (Zurama) W. Turton, 1831 ·; † Nanopatula Pfeffer, 1930; † Vallonia (Nanopatula) Pfeffer, 1930 · accepted, alternate representation; Vallonia (Planivallonia) Schileyko, 1984 (junior synonym); Vallonia (Vallonia) Risso, 1826; Zurama W. Turton, 1831 (Invalid: junior objective synonym of Circinaria Beck, 1837)

= Vallonia =

Genus of gastropods

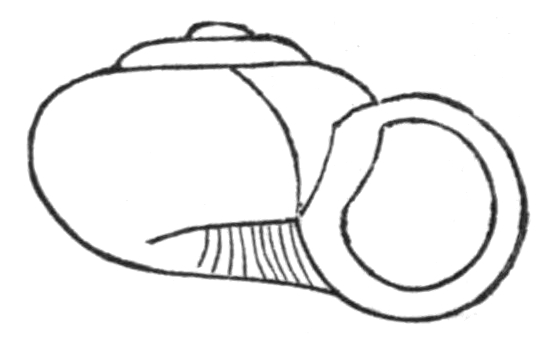
A shell of Vallonia pulchella

Vallonia is a genus of small air-breathing land snails, terrestrial pulmonate gastropod mollusks in the family Valloniidae.

Vallonia is the type genus of the family Valloniidae.

== Species ==
Species in the genus Vallonia include:

- Vallonia asiatica (G. Nevill, 1878)
- † Vallonia berryi Pierce, 1992
- † Vallonia brochoni (Degrange-Touzin, 1892)
- † Vallonia chimaira Gerber, 1996
- Vallonia chinensis K. Suzuki, 1944
- Vallonia costata (O. F. Müller, 1774)
- Vallonia costohimala Gerber & Bössneck, 2009
- Vallonia cyclophorella Sterki, 1892 - silky vallonia
- Vallonia declivis Sterki, 1893
- Vallonia eiapopeia Gerber, 1996
- Vallonia enniensis (Gredler, 1856)
- Vallonia excentrica Sterki, 1893 - excentric vallonia
- † Vallonia gigantea Steklov, 1967
- † Vallonia girauxae (Cossmann, 1902)
- Vallonia gracilicosta Reinhardt, 1883
- Vallonia himalaevis Gerber & Bössneck, 2009
- † Vallonia hoppla Gerber, 1996
- Vallonia kamtschatica I. M. Likharev, 1963
- Vallonia kathrinae Gerber & Bössneck, 2009
- † Vallonia kootenayorum Pierce, 2001
- Vallonia ladacensis (G. Nevill, 1878)
- † Vallonia laxa Gerber, 1996
- † Vallonia lepida (Reuss, 1849)
- † Vallonia major Gottschick, 1920
- Vallonia mionecton (O. Boettger, 1889)
- † Vallonia pallaryi Wenz, 1919
- Vallonia parvula Sterki, 1893
- Vallonia patens Reinhardt, 1883
- Vallonia persica Rosen, 1892
- Vallonia perspectiva Sterki, 1893 - thin lip vallonia
- Vallonia peteri Schileyko, 1984
- Vallonia pulchella (O. F. Müller, 1774) - lovely vallonia - type species
- Vallonia pulchellula (Heude, 1882)
- Vallonia ranovi Meng & Gerber, 2008
- † Vallonia sandbergeri (Deshayes, 1863)
- † Vallonia sparnacensis (Deshayes, 1863)
- † Vallonia stworzewiczae Neubauer, 2013
- † Vallonia subcyclophorella (Gottschick, 1911)
- Vallonia suevica Geyer, 1908
- Vallonia tenuilabris (Braun, 1843)
- Vallonia terraenovae Gerber, 1996
- Vallonia tokunagai K. Suzuki, 1944
- † Vallonia tumida Stworzewicz, 2007
- Vallonia zaru Almuhambetova, 1979
- † Vallonia zykini Prysiazhniuk, 2016 †

Synonyms

- Vallonia allamanica Geyer, 1908: synonym of Vallonia suevica Geyer, 1908 (junior synonym)
- Vallonia albula Sterki, 1893: synonym of Vallonia gracilicosta Reinhardt, 1883
- Vallonia americana Ancey, 1893: synonym of Vallonia parvula Sterki, 1893 (junior subjective synonym)
- Vallonia astoma O. Boettger, 1909: synonym of Gittenbergia sororcula (Benoit, 1859) (junior synonym)
- Vallonia costataeformis Jooss, 1912: synonym of Vallonia costata (O. F. Müller, 1774) (junior subjective synonym)
- Vallonia jurassica Geyer, 1908: synonym of Vallonia costata (O. F. Müller, 1774)
- Vallonia ladakensis (G. Nevill, 1878): synonym of Vallonia ladacensis (G. Nevill, 1878) (unjustified emendation of Vallonia ladacensis (Nevill, 1878))
- Vallonia miserrima Gude, 1907: synonym of Vallonia ladacensis (G. Nevill, 1878) (junior synonym)
- Vallonia miserrina Gude, 1907: synonym of Vallonia miserrima Gude, 1907: synonym of Vallonia ladacensis (G. Nevill, 1878) (incorrect subsequent spelling)
- † Vallonia moguntiaca Wenz, 1915: synonym of † Vallonia lepida (Reuss, 1849) (unaccepted > junior subjective synonym)
- Vallonia rosalia Risso, 1826: synonym of Vallonia costata (O. F. Müller, 1774)
- Vallonia sonorana Pilsbry, 1915: synonym of Vallonia gracilicosta Reinhardt, 1883
- † Vallonia subpulchella (F. Sandberger, 1872): synonym of † Vallonia lepida (Reuss, 1849) (junior subjective synonym)
- Vallonia tenera (Reinhardt, 1877): synonym of Vallonia pulchellula (Heude, 1882) (junior synonym)
