= Speleodentorcula =

Scientific classification
- Kingdom: Animalia
- Phylum: Mollusca
- Class: Gastropoda
- Order: Stylommatophora
- Family: Argnidae
- Genus: Speleodentorcula; Gittenberger, 1985
- Species: S. beroni

Binomial name
- Speleodentorcula beroni Gittenberger, 1985

Genus of Gastropods

Speleodentorcula is a monotypic genus of gastropods belonging to the family Argnidae. The only species is Speleodentorcula beroni.

The species is found in Europe.
