= Plagyrona =

Scientific classification
- Kingdom: Animalia
- Phylum: Mollusca
- Class: Gastropoda
- Order: Stylommatophora
- Family: Valloniidae
- Genus: Plagyrona; Gittenberger, 1977

Genus of land snails

Plagyrona is a genus of gastropods belonging to the family Valloniidae.

The species of this genus are found in Southern Europe.

Species:

- Plagyrona angusta D.T.Holyoak & G.A.Holyoak, 2012
- Plagyrona debeauxiana (Bourguignat, 1863)
- Plagyrona placida (Shuttleworth, 1852)
