= Charles des Moulins =

French botanist and malacologist (1798–1875)

Charles Des Moulins, full name Charles Robert Alexandre Des Moulins (13 March 1798 – 23 December 1875) was a French naturalist, a botanist and malacologist.

He was a member of several learned societies, including the American Philosophical Society, which elected him an international Member in 1861, and the Société linnéenne de Bordeaux, for which he served as president in 1826.

== Taxa ==
Moulins named and described numerous species of snails, for example:

- Pagodulina pagodula (Des Moulins, 1830)

In turn, in recognition of his services to malacology, a number of species of mollusks were named after him. These latter species included both fossil and recent, both bivalves and gastropods, and were mainly non-marine species, however, a few were marine species. Examples as follows:

- Pisania desmoulinsi Montrouzier, 1864 , a marine gastropod
- Anodonta desmoulinsiana Locard, 1882 , a freshwater bivalve
- Nerita desmoulinsiana Dautzenberg & Bouge, 1933, a marine gastropod
- Vertigo moulinsiana Dupuy, 1849, a terrestrial gastropod

Moulins also named various species of plants, including:

- Euphorbia milii Des Moulins, 1826

The botanical genus Moulinsia (family Sapindaceae) was named in his honor by Jacques Cambessèdes.

== Bibliography ==
- 1831: Etudes s. l. Echinides
- 1840: Catalogue raisonné des plantes qui croissent spontanément dans le département de la Dordogne. distribuées d'après le synopsis florae Germanicae et Helveticae du docteur G.D.J. Koch. Bordeaux : Th. Lafargue.
- 1859: Comparaison des départements de la Gironde et de la Dordogne sous le rapport de leur végétation spontanée et de leurs cultures.
- 1869: Quelques réflexions sur la doctrine scientifique dite Darwinisme.
