= Planogyra =

Scientific classification
- Kingdom: Animalia
- Phylum: Mollusca
- Class: Gastropoda
- Order: Stylommatophora
- Family: Valloniidae
- Genus: Planogyra; Morse, 1864

Genus of gastropods

Planogyra is a genus of small air-breathing land snails, terrestrial pulmonate gastropod mollusks in the family Valloniidae.

== Species ==
Species within the genus Planogyra include:

- Planogyra asteriscus (E. S. Morse, 1857)
- Planogyra clappi
