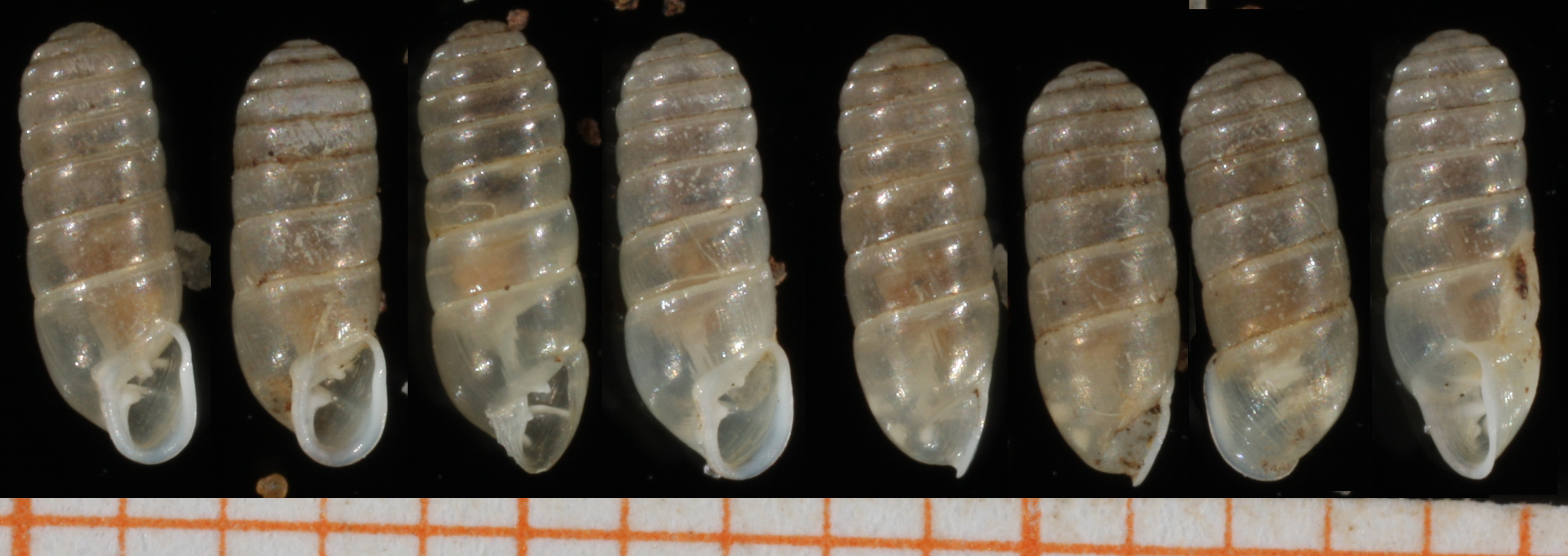
- Shells of Argna biplicata

Scientific classification
- Kingdom: Animalia
- Phylum: Mollusca
- Class: Gastropoda
- Order: Stylommatophora
- Family: Argnidae
- Genus: Argna; Cossmann, 1889

Synonyms
- Agardhia Gude, 1911; Agardhia (Agardhia) Gude, 1911; Argna (Argna) Cossmann, 1889; Coryna Westerlund, 1887 (Invalid: junior homonym of Coryna J.P. Wolff, 1811 [Hemiptera] and several others); Granoennea Wenz, 1920 † (junior synonym); Pupa (Coryna) Westerlund, 1887 (Invalid: junior homonym of Coryna J.P. Wolff, 1811 [Hemiptera] and several others); Rhytidochasma A.J. Wagner, 1914

= Argna =

Genus of gastropods

Argna is a genus of air-breathing land snails, terrestrial pulmonate gastropod mollusks in the family Argnidae.

== Species ==
Species within the genus Argna include:

- Argna bielzi (Rossmässler, 1859)
- Argna biplicata (Michaud, 1831)
- Argna bourguignatiana (Nevill, 1880)
- Argna ferrari (Porro, 1838)
- Argna szekeresi A. Reischütz, N. Steiner-Reischütz & P.L. Reischütz, 2016
- Argna thracica Subai, 1999
- Argna valsabina (Spinelli, 1851)
