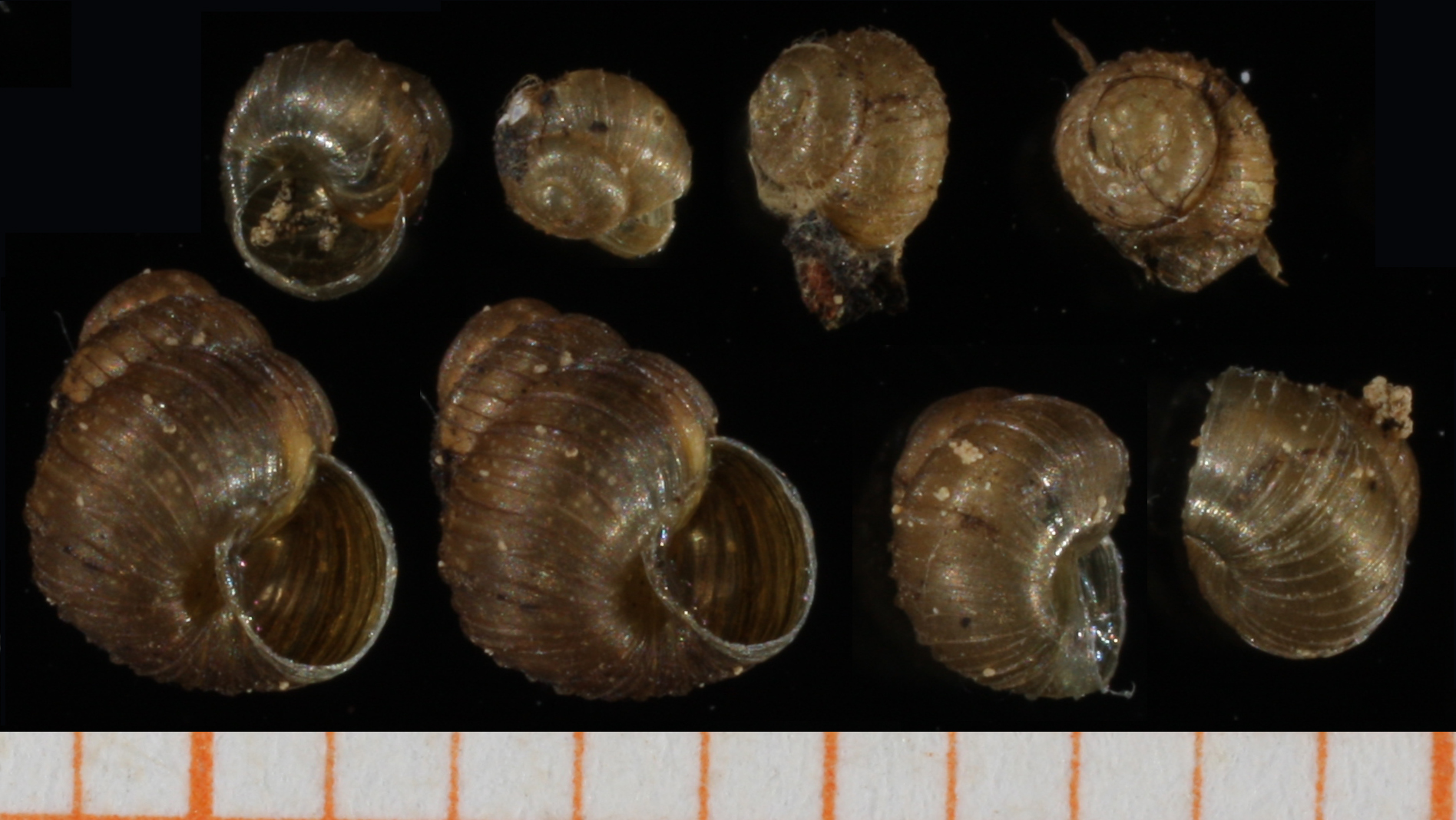
- Zoogenetes harpa

Scientific classification
- Kingdom: Animalia
- Phylum: Mollusca
- Class: Gastropoda
- Order: Stylommatophora
- Family: Valloniidae
- Genus: Zoogenetes; Morse, 1864

Species
- Zoogenetes harpa (Say, 1824); Zoogenetes tyosenica Kuroda & Hukuda, 1944

Synonyms
- Zoogenites [sic]

= Zoogenetes =

Genus of molluscs

Zoogenetes is genus of minute, air-breathing land snails, terrestrial pulmonate gastropod molluscs in the family Valloniidae.

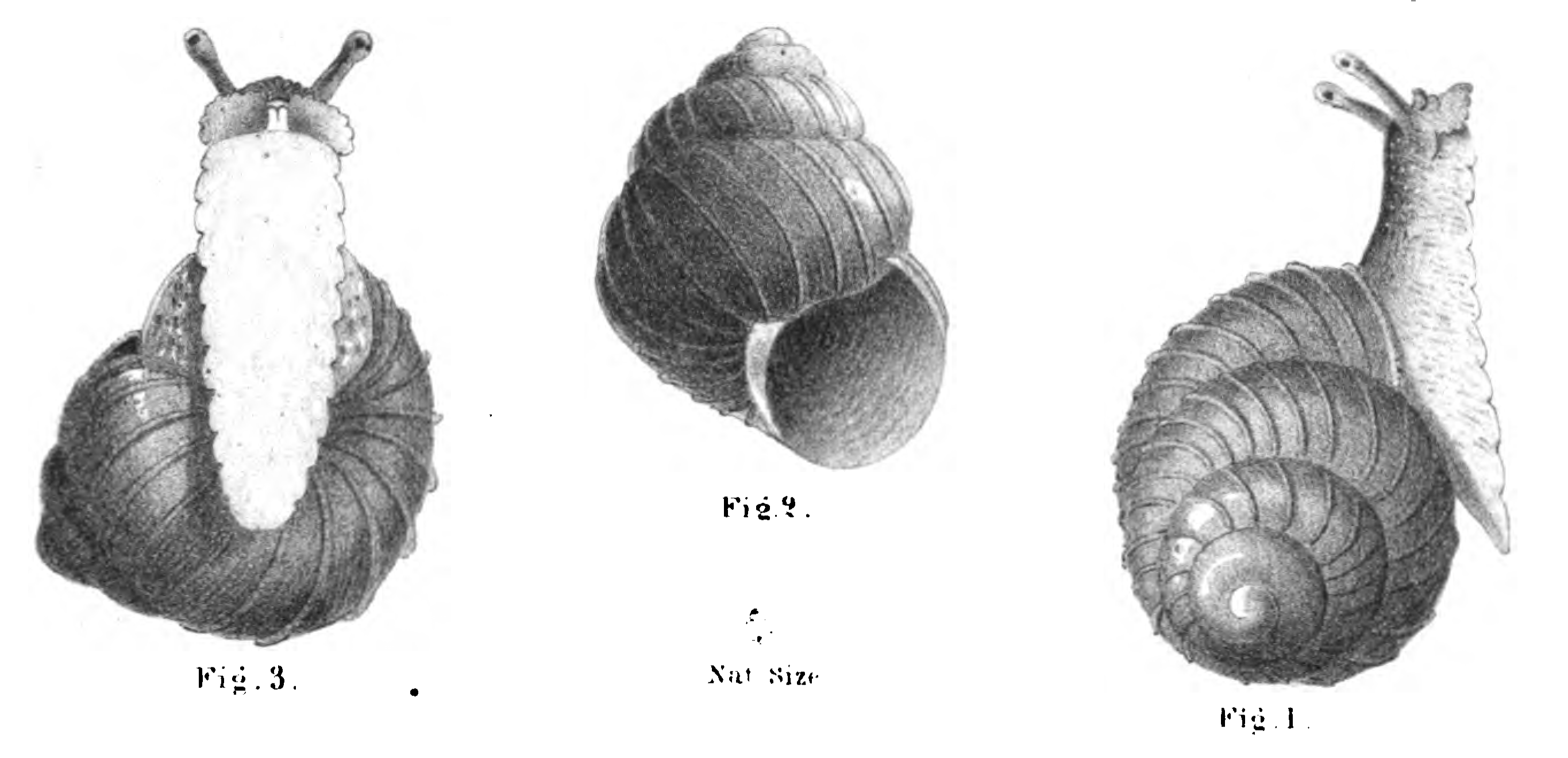
Three views of Zoogenetes harpa from Morse (1864)
