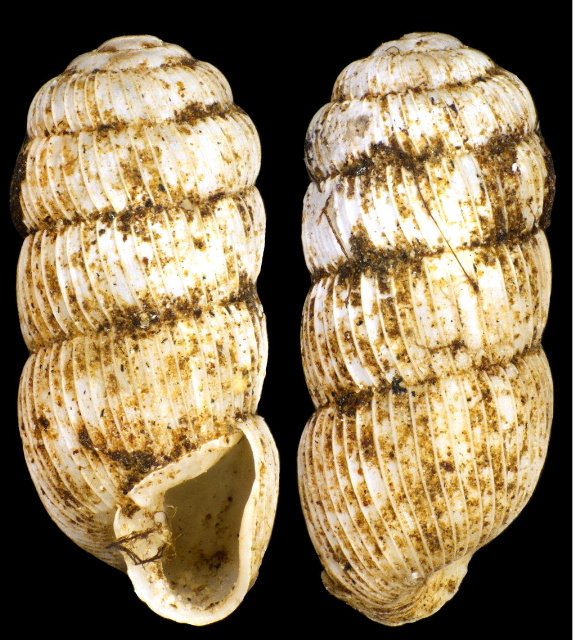
- Shell of Agardhiella truncatella (specimen at the Biologiezentrum Linz Oberoesterreich)

Scientific classification
- Kingdom: Animalia
- Phylum: Mollusca
- Class: Gastropoda
- Order: Stylommatophora
- Infraorder: Pupilloidei
- Superfamily: Pupilloidea
- Family: Agardhiellidae
- Genus: Agardhiella; Hesse, 1923

Type species
- Pupa truncatella L. Pfeiffer, 1841

Synonyms
- Argna (Agardhiella) (superseded generic combination)

= Agardhiella (gastropod) =

Genus of gastropods

Agardhiella is a genus of terrestrial gastropods belonging to the family Agardhiellidae.

The species of this genus are found in Southern Europe.

== Species ==
- Agardhiella armata (Clessin, 1887) (south-western Romania, eastern Serbia, North Macedonia, and the northern parts of Bulgaria)
- Agardhiella banatica (Zilch, 1958) (Romania)
- Agardhiella biarmata (Boettger, 1880) (Bosnia and Hercegovina, Croatia and Montenegro)
- Agardhiella caesa (Westerlund, 1878) (Bulgaria and Romania)
- Agardhiella crassilabris (Grossu & Negrea, 1969) (Romania)
- Agardhiella dabovici E. Gittenberger, 1975 (Montenegro)
- Agardhiella domokosi Subai, 2011 (Romania)
- Agardhiella extravaganta Subai, 2008 (Albania)
- Agardhiella formosa (L. Pfeiffer, 1848) (Montenegro)
- Agardhiella grossui (Zilch, 1958) (Romania)
- Agardhiella incerta Grossu, 1986 (Romania and Serbia)
- Agardhiella reinhardti (Zilch, 1958) (Romania)
- Agardhiella johanni E. Gittenberger, 2015 (Albania)
- Agardhiella joschmidti A. Reischütz, N. Steiner-Reischütz & P. L. Reischütz, 2019 (Greece)
- Agardhiella lamellata (Clessin, 1887) (Romania)
- Agardhiella langaleta Subai, 2011 (Bulgaria)
- Agardhiella macrodonta (P. Hesse, 1916) (Bulgaria, Greece and Serbia)
- Agardhiella mista A. Reischütz, N. Steiner-Reischütz & P. L. Reischütz, 2016 (Greece)
- Agardhiella parreyssii (L. Pfeiffer, 1848) (Bulgaria, Greece and less likely Czechia, Hungary, Romania and Slovakia)
- Agardhiella pirotana Subai, 2011 (Serbia)
- Agardhiella serbica Subai, 2011 (Serbia)
- Agardhiella skipetarica (A. J. Wagner, 1914) (Albania, Croatia, Montenegro and Corfu, Greece)
- Agardhiella stenostoma (Flach, 1890) (Croatia and Montenegro)
- Agardhiella truncatella (L. Pfeiffer, 1841) (Albania, Austria, Bosnia and Herzegovina, Croatia, Greece, Italy, Montenegro, North Macedonia, Serbia and Slovenia)
- Agardhiella tunde Deli, 2010 (Romania)
- Agardhiella zoltanorum Subai, 2008 (Albania)

Species brought into synonymy

- Agardhiella licherdopoli Grossu, 1986: synonym of Agardhiella parreyssii (L. Pfeiffer, 1848) (junior synonym)
- Agardhiella prahovensis Grossu, 1986: synonym of Agardhiella lamellata (Clessin, 1887) (junior synonym)
