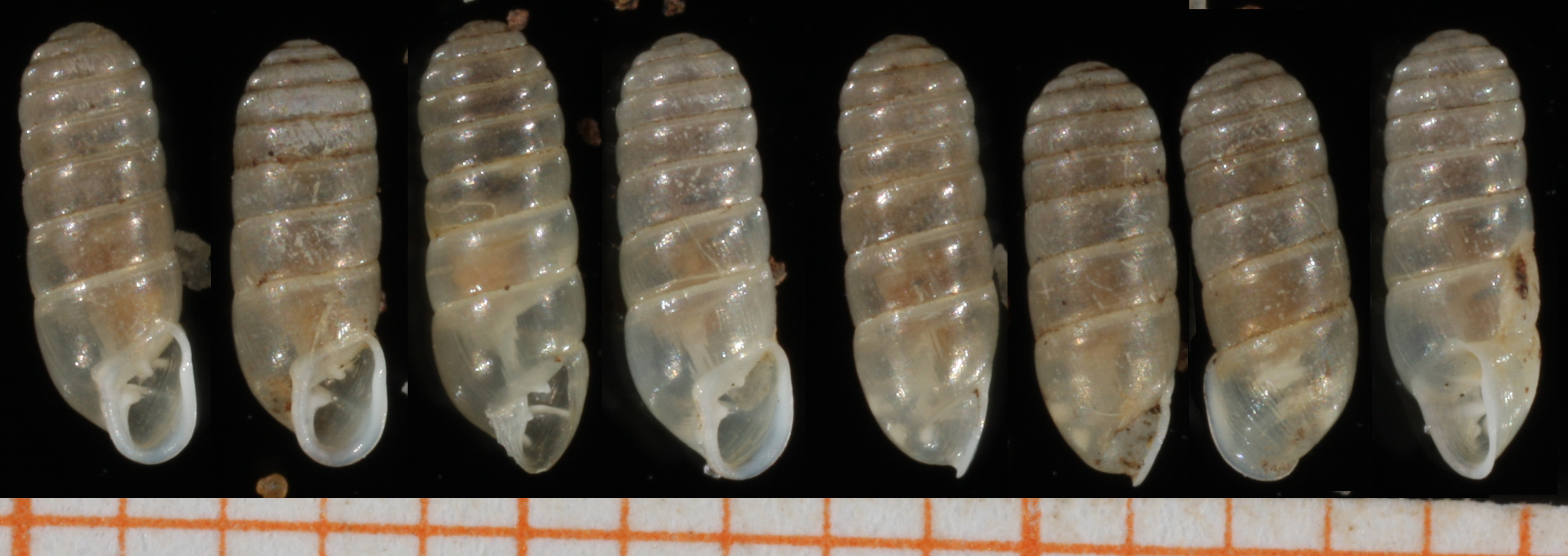
- Shells of Argna biplicata

Scientific classification
- Kingdom: Animalia
- Phylum: Mollusca
- Class: Gastropoda
- Order: Stylommatophora
- Superfamily: Pupilloidea
- Family: Argnidae; Hudec, 1965

Genera
- See text.

= Argnidae =

Argnidae Temporal range: Miocene–Recent Upper Miocene-Recent

Family of gastropods

Argnidae is a family of air-breathing land snails, terrestrial pulmonate gastropod mollusks.

== Distribution ==
Distribution of Argnidae include Europe: southern and eastern Alps and Carpathian Mountains.

== Taxonomy ==
The family Argnidae is classified within the informal group Orthurethra, itself belonging to the clade Stylommatophora within the clade Eupulmonata (according to the taxonomy of the Gastropoda by Bouchet & Rocroi, 2005).

Argnidae has no subfamilies (according to the taxonomy of the Gastropoda by Bouchet & Rocroi, 2005).

== Genera ==
Genera in the family Argnidae include:

- Agardhiella Hesse, 1923
- Argna Cossmann, 1889 - type genus. The type species of this genus is fossil, but the genus contains also recent species.
- Speleodentorcula Gittenberger, 1985
