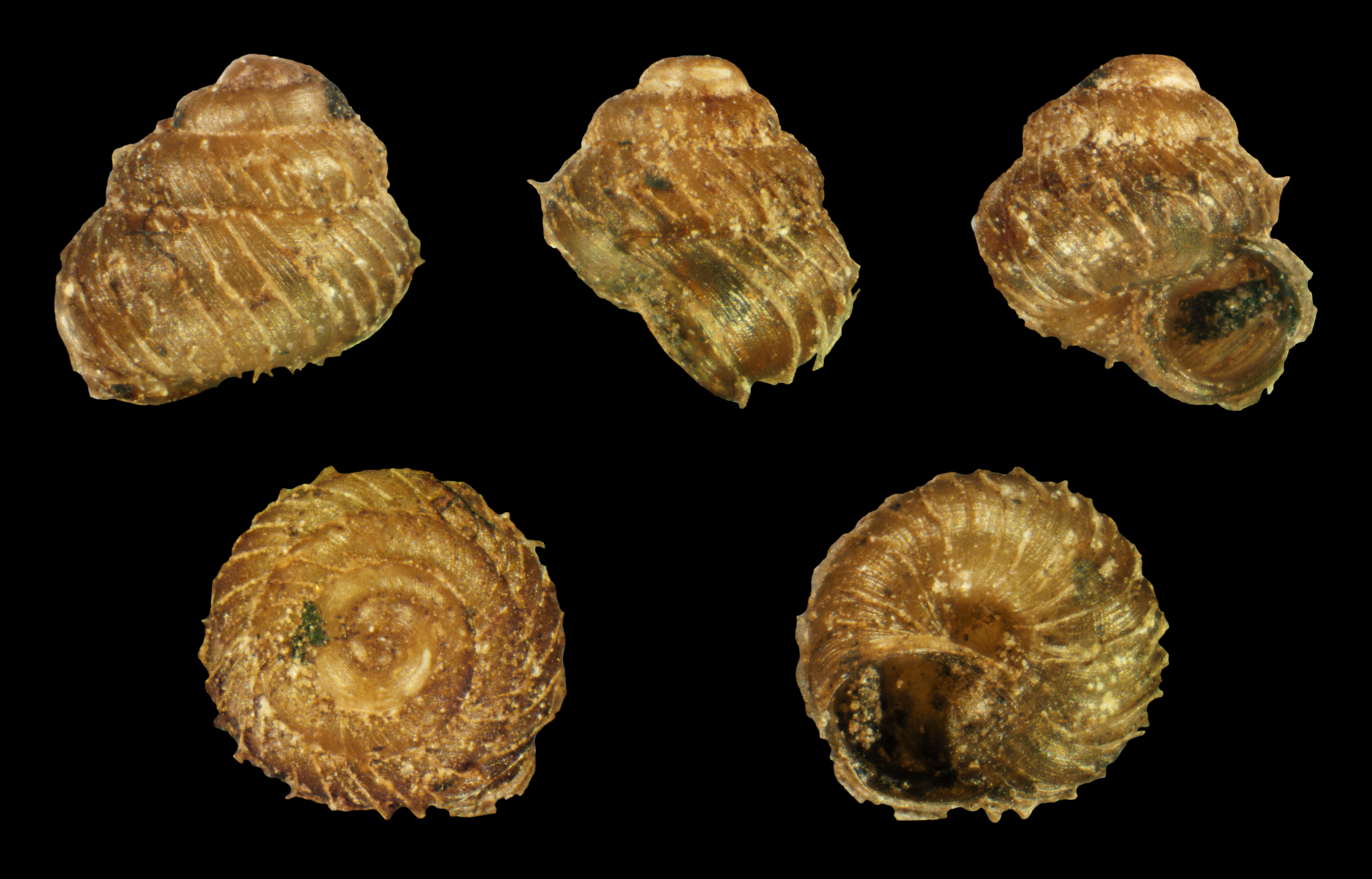
- Shell of Acanthinula aculeata

Scientific classification
- Kingdom: Animalia
- Phylum: Mollusca
- Class: Gastropoda
- Order: Stylommatophora
- Family: Valloniidae
- Genus: Acanthinula
- Species: A. aculeata

Binomial name
- Acanthinula aculeata (O. F. Müller, 1774)

= Acanthinula aculeata =

Species of gastropod

Acanthinula aculeata is a species of small, air-breathing land snail, a terrestrial pulmonate gastropod mollusk or micromollusk in the family Valloniidae.

== Description ==
For terms see gastropod shell.

The 1.9-2.1 mm. shell is slightly higher than wide and brown in colour. The periostracum bears ribs ( elevated, radial ridges) with characteristic spines. The aperture is circular. The animal is grey on the dorsum and tentacles. The foot and sole margin are white.

== Distribution ==
This species is found in Bulgaria, the Czech Republic, Estonia, Poland, the Netherlands, Slovakia, Great Britain, Ireland, Ukraine and elsewhere.
