= Carl Agardh Westerlund =

Swedish malacologist (1831–1908)

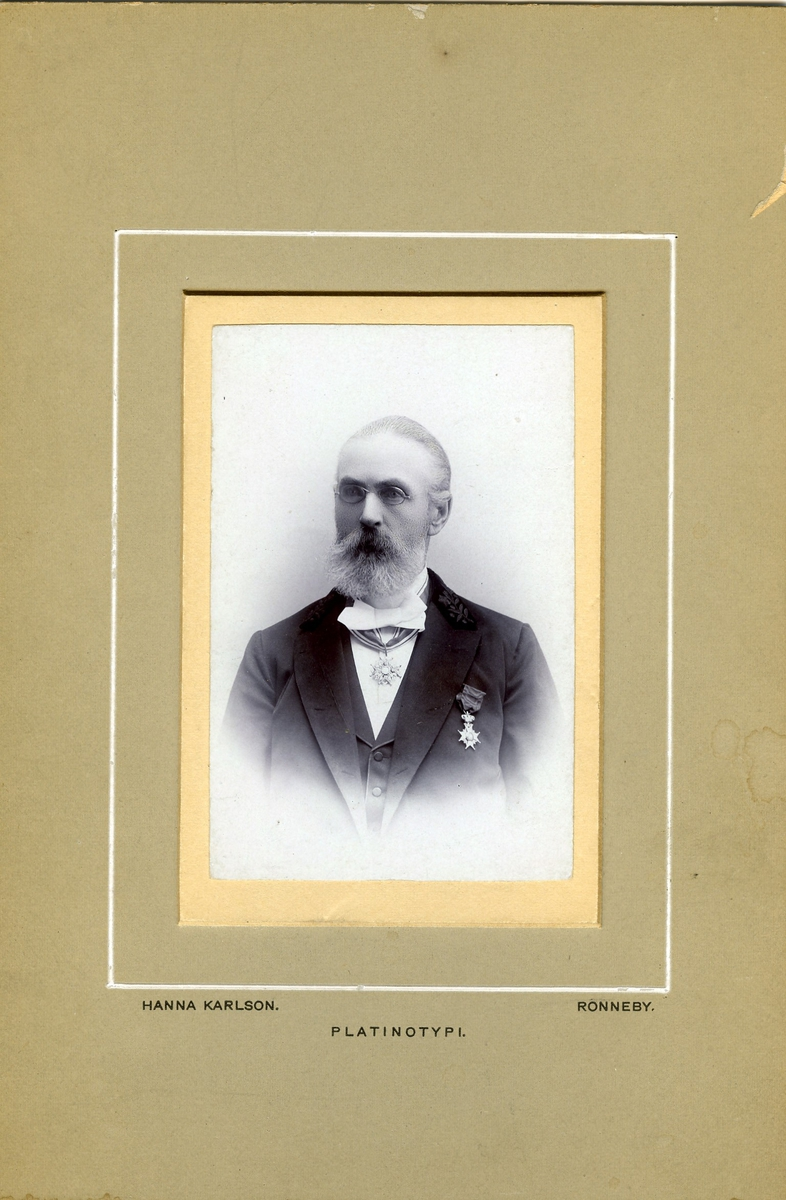
Carl Agardh Westerlund

Carl Agardh Westerlund (12 January 1831 – 28 February 1908 in Ronneby) was a Swedish malacologist.

== Biography ==
Westerlund was born at Berga in Kalmar County, Sweden. He became a student in Uppsala University in 1853 and studied at Lund University where he received his bachelor's degree in 1860 and became a Ph.D. in 1862.

He worked as a temporary teacher in Malmö in 1858–1859 and in Landskrona 1860–1862, and was a teacher at the high school in Ronneby from 1862 to 1893.

Westerlund contributed much to the knowledge of the land and freshwater molluscs of the palearctic region, despite working under unfavourable conditions. His largest work was Fauna der in der paläarctischen Region... lebenden Binnenconchylien in 9 volumes published 1884–1890. He also contributed papers in ornithology and botany.

== Works ==
- 1865 Sveriges land- och sötvatten-mollusker, beskrifna af Carl Agardh Westerlund Lund, I kommission hos C.W.K. Gleerups sortiment
- Fauna Molluscorum Terrestrium et Fluviatilium Sveciæ, Norvegiæ et Daniæ. Sveriges, Norges och Danmarks land och sötvatten-mollusker. I. Landmolluskerna. Stockholm: Adolf Bonnier. [5] + 296 p.
- 1877 Sibiriens land- och sötvatten-mollusker. Kongliga Svenska Vetenskaps-Akademins Handlingar (Ny Följd) 14 (12): 1–111, pl. [1]
- 1883.Von der Vega-expedition in Asien gesammelteBinnen mollusken. Nachrichtsblatt der Deutschen Malakozoologischen Gesellschaft 1883 15 (3–4): 48–59
- 1890 Katalog der in der Paläarctischen Region lebenden Binnenconchylien, von Dr. Carl Agardh Westerlund. Karlshamn, E.G. Johansson's Buchdruckerei
- 1897 Synopsis molluscorum extramarinorum Scandinaviæ (Suecae, Norvegae, Danae & Fennae) Helsingfors :[s.n.]
