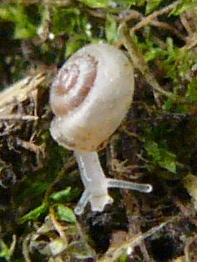
- A live individual of Vallonia pulchella

Conservation status
- Secure (NatureServe)

Scientific classification
- Kingdom: Animalia
- Phylum: Mollusca
- Class: Gastropoda
- Order: Stylommatophora
- Family: Valloniidae
- Genus: Vallonia
- Species: V. pulchella

Binomial name
- Vallonia pulchella (O. F. Müller, 1774)

Synonyms
- Helix (Glaphyra) pulchella O. F. Müller, 1774 superseded combination; Helix (Vallonia) pulchella O. F. Müller, 1774 superseded combination; † Helix (Vallonia) subpulchella var. oenotria De Stefani, 1880 junior subjective synonym (tentative junior synonym); Helix adela Westerlund, 1874 junior subjective synonym; Helix extrema Westerlund, 1898 junior subjective synonym; Helix minuta Say, 1817 junior subjective synonym; Helix paludosa da Costa, 1778 junior subjective synonym; Helix pulchella Müller, 1774; Vallonia (Vallonia) pulchella (O. F. Müller, 1774) · alternate representation; † Vallonia subpulchella oenotria (De Stefani, 1880) junior subjective synonym (tentative junior synonym)

= Vallonia pulchella =

Species of gastropod

Vallonia pulchella, common name the lovely vallonia, is a species of very small air-breathing land snail, a terrestrial pulmonate gastropod mollusk in the family Valloniidae.

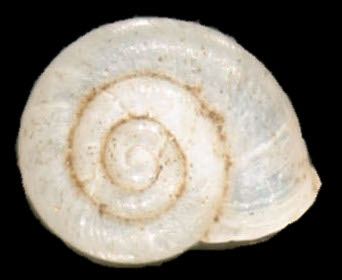
Apical view of the shell of Vallonia pulchella

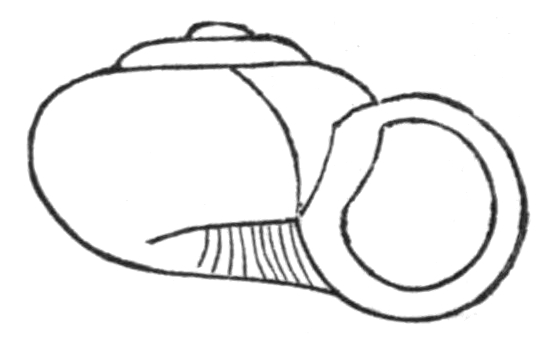
Apertural view of the shell of Vallonia pulchella

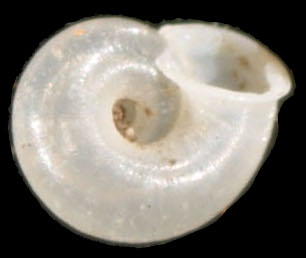
Basal view of the shell of Vallonia pulchella

== Description ==
For terms see gastropod shell

The shell is circular in outline, with 3.2 - 3.3 whorls. The last whorl is wider immediately before the aperture, and is not much descending. Compared to Vallonia costata, the aperture is not very oblique, and the lip is weaker than in that species. Vallonia pulchella also has slightly more elevated whorls than Vallonia costata. Like other Vallonia species, the umbilicus is very wide.

The shell is ivory-white with very fine and irregular streaks. The soft parts are milky white. The tentacles are short, and the posterior end of the foot is round.

== Distribution ==
This species occurs in several countries and islands, including:

Europe:

- Great Britain
- Ireland
- Czech Republic
- Slovakia
- Poland
- Ukraine
- Germany
- Netherlands
- Latvia
- and other areas

America:

- British Columbia, Canada
- Illinois, United States of America
- Brazil
- Tatarstan Kazan

== Life habits ==
The size of the egg is 0.5 mm.

In this species some parental care was observed: apparently the eggs were cleaned of fungi. Parental care is very rare in gastropods in general and has otherwise been observed only in the genus Libera.

V. pulchella thrives best in habitats characterized by relatively moist and conductive soil, large soil aggregates, low temperatures at 0-10 cm depth, a well-developed litter layer, low light level, and low numbers of plants which change shape in response to humidity and/or light levels.

In North America it is commonly found in woodlands and suburban gardens.
