= Agardhiellidae =

Scientific classification
- Kingdom: Animalia
- Phylum: Mollusca
- Class: Gastropoda
- Order: Stylommatophora
- Superfamily: Pupilloidea
- Family: Agardhiellidae; Harl & Páll-Gergely, 2017

Family of molluscs

Agardhiellidae is a family of gastropods belonging to the order Stylommatophora.

Genera:

- Agardhiella Hesse, 1923
- Enneopupa Boettger, 1889
