= Pagodulinidae =

Scientific classification
- Kingdom: Animalia
- Phylum: Mollusca
- Class: Gastropoda
- Order: Stylommatophora
- Suborder: Helicina
- Infraorder: Pupilloidei
- Superfamily: Pupilloidea
- Family: Pagodulinidae; Pilsbry, 1924

Family of molluscs

Pagodulinidae is a family of gastropods belonging to the superfamily Pupilloidea.

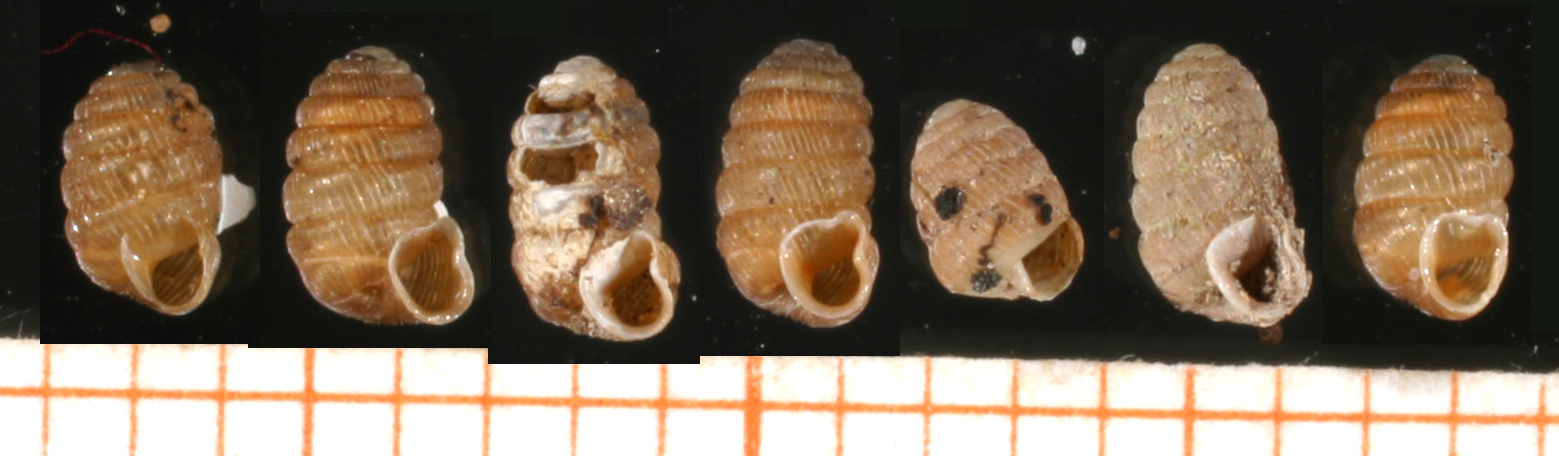
List of photos of Pagodulinidae with different physical aspects

== Genera ==
- Pagodulina Clessin, 1876

Genera brought into synonymy

- Crystallifera Schileyko, 1976: synonym of Pagodulina Clessin, 1876
- Pagodina Stabile, 1864: synonym of Pagodulina Clessin, 1876
- Pagodinella Thiele, 1917 : synonym of Pagodulina Clessin, 1876
- Pagodula P. Hesse, 1916: synonym of Pagodulina Clessin, 1876
