= Victor Sterki =

Swiss malacologist (1846-1933)

- Born: 1846; Solothurn, Switzerland
- Died: 1933 (aged 86–87)
- Education: University of Bern; Ludwig-Maximilians-Universität München
- Known for: Research in Pupillidae and in Sphaeriidae
- Scientific career
- Fields: malacology

Victor Sterki (26 September 1846 in Solothurn, Switzerland – 25 January 1933 in New Philadelphia, OH) was a malacologist from Switzerland who lived in the United States.

He worked as an assistant in the Section of Invertebrates in the Carnegie Museum of Natural History from 1909 to 1933.

Malacological collections by Sterki of Pupillidae have 4000 lots and of Sphaeriidae have 12,000 lots. Both collections are deposited in the Carnegie Museum of Natural History.

The malacological journal Sterkiana and the land snail species Guppya sterkii were named after him.
