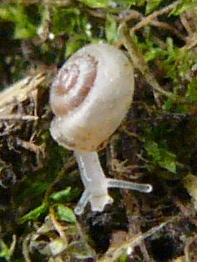
- A live Vallonia pulchella (Valloniidae)

Scientific classification
- Kingdom: Animalia
- Phylum: Mollusca
- Class: Gastropoda
- Subcohort: Panpulmonata
- Superorder: Eupulmonata
- Order: Stylommatophora
- Suborder: Helicina
- Infraorder: Pupilloidei
- Superfamily: Pupilloidea; Turton, 1831

Families
- See text

Synonyms
- Cionelloidea L. Pfeiffer, 1879 ·; Enoidea B. B. Woodward, 1903 (1880); Orculoidea Pilsbry, 1918 ·; Vertiginoidea Fitzinger, 1833

= Pupilloidea =

Superfamily of gastropods

Pupilloidea is a superfamily of small and very small air-breathing land snails, terrestrial gastropods in the infraorder Pupilloidei.

They are diverse in morphology, habitat, and ecological roles.

== Description ==
They are characterized by their small, often cylindrical, ovate, or elongate shells. Their shells can range from smooth to ribbed or striated. They are generally tiny, ranging from a few millimeters to about a centimeter in length. The aperture often has denticles (teeth) or lamellae, which may play roles in predator deterrence or structural support. The margin of the aperture often features a well-defined peristome, sometimes thickened or reflected.

== Distribution ==
Species in this superfamily are cosmopolitan, found on every continent except Antarctica. They can be found in dry and arid regions to temperate forests and even tropical zones.

== Taxonomy ==
This superfamily contains the following families:

- Achatinellidae Gulick, 1873
- Agardhiellidae Harl & Páll-Gergely, 2017
- Amastridae Pilsbry, 1910
- Argnidae Hudec, 1965
- Cerastidae Wenz, 1923
- Cochlicopidae Pilsbry, 1900 (1879)
- Draparnaudiidae Solem, 1962
- Enidae B. B. Woodward, 1903 (1880)
- Fauxulidae Harl & Páll-Gergely, 2017
- Gastrocoptidae Pilsbry, 1918
- Hypselostomatidae Zilch, 1959
- Lauriidae Steenberg, 1925
- Odontocycladidae Hausdorf, 1996
- Orculidae Pilsbry, 1918
- Pagodulinidae Pilsbry, 1924
- Partulidae Pilsbry, 1900
- Pleurodiscidae Wenz, 1923
- Pupillidae W. Turton, 1831
- Pyramidulidae Kennard & B. B. Woodward, 1914
- Spelaeoconchidae A. J. Wagner, 1928
- Spelaeodiscidae Steenberg, 1925
- Strobilopsidae Wenz, 1915
- Valloniidae Morse, 1864
- Vertiginidae Fitzinger, 1833

=== Synonyms ===
- Cerastuidae Wenz, 1930: synonym of Cerastidae Wenz, 1923
- Chondrulidae A. J. Wagner, 1928: synonym of Chondrulini Wenz, 1923 (junior synonym)
- Cionellidae L. Pfeiffer, 1879: synonym of Cochlicopidae Pilsbry, 1900 (1879)
- Elasmiatidae Kuroda & Habe, 1949: synonym of Elasmiatini Kuroda & Habe, 1949 (original rank)
- Family Pachnodidae Steenberg, 1925: synonym of Cerastidae Wenz, 1923
- Pupidae J. Fleming, 1822: synonym of Cerionidae Pilsbry, 1901 (invalid: type genus a junior homonym of Pupa Röding, 1798 [Acteonidae])
- Pupisomatidae Iredale, 1940: synonym of Valloniidae Morse, 1864
- Pupoididae Iredale, 1939: synonym of Pupillidae W. Turton, 1831
- Strobilidae Jooss, 1911: synonym of Strobilopsidae Wenz, 1915 (invalid: type genus a junior homonym of Strobila M. Sars, 1829 [Cnidaria])
- Tornatellinidae Sykes, 1900: synonym of Tornatellininae Sykes, 1900 (original rank)
- Zuidae Bourguignat, 1884: synonym of Cochlicopidae Pilsbry, 1900 (1879)
