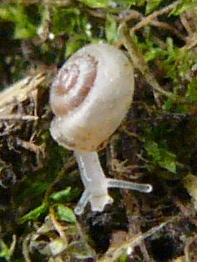
- A live individual of Vallonia pulchella

Scientific classification
- Kingdom: Animalia
- Phylum: Mollusca
- Class: Gastropoda
- Order: Stylommatophora
- Superfamily: Pupilloidea
- Family: Valloniidae; Morse, 1864

Synonyms
- Circinariidae Pilsbry, 1896; Acanthinulinae Steenberg, 1917; Pupisomatidae Iredale, 1940

= Valloniidae =

Family of gastropods

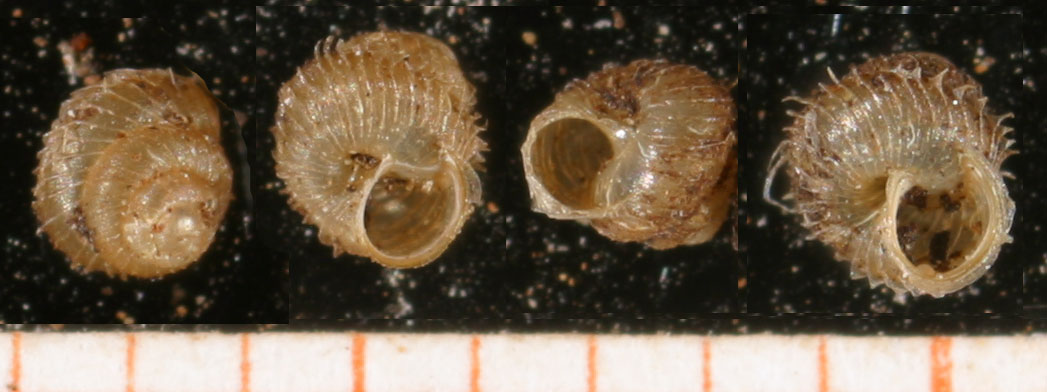
Four shells of Acanthinula aculeata

Valloniidae is a taxonomic family of small and minute, air-breathing land snails, terrestrial pulmonate gastropod mollusks in the superfamily Pupilloidea.

== Chromosome number ==
In this family, the number of haploid chromosomes lies between 26 and 30 (according to the values in this table).

== Taxonomy ==
The family Valloniidae has no subfamilies (according to the taxonomy of the Gastropoda by Bouchet & Rocroi, 2005).

== Genera ==
Genera within the family Valloniidae include:

- † Acanthopupa Wenz in Fischer & Wenz, 1914
- † Esuinella Harzhauser, Neubauer & Georgopoulou in Harzhauser et al., 2014
- † Nanxiongospira Yü, 1977
- † Sexlamellospira Wang, 1982
- † Shanghuspira Yü, 1977

Subfamily Acanthinulinae Steenberg, 1917

- Acanthinula Beck, 1847
- Pupisoma Stoliczka, 1873
- Salpingoma F. Haas, 1937
- Spermodea Westerlund, 1902
- Zoogenetes Morse, 1864

Subfamily Valloniinae Morse, 1864

- Gittenbergia Giusti, Castagnoli & Manganelli, 1985
- Plagyrona E. Gittenberger, 1977
- Planogyra Morse, 1864
- Vallonia Risso, 1826 - the type genus of the family Valloniidae
