= List of mammals of Montana =

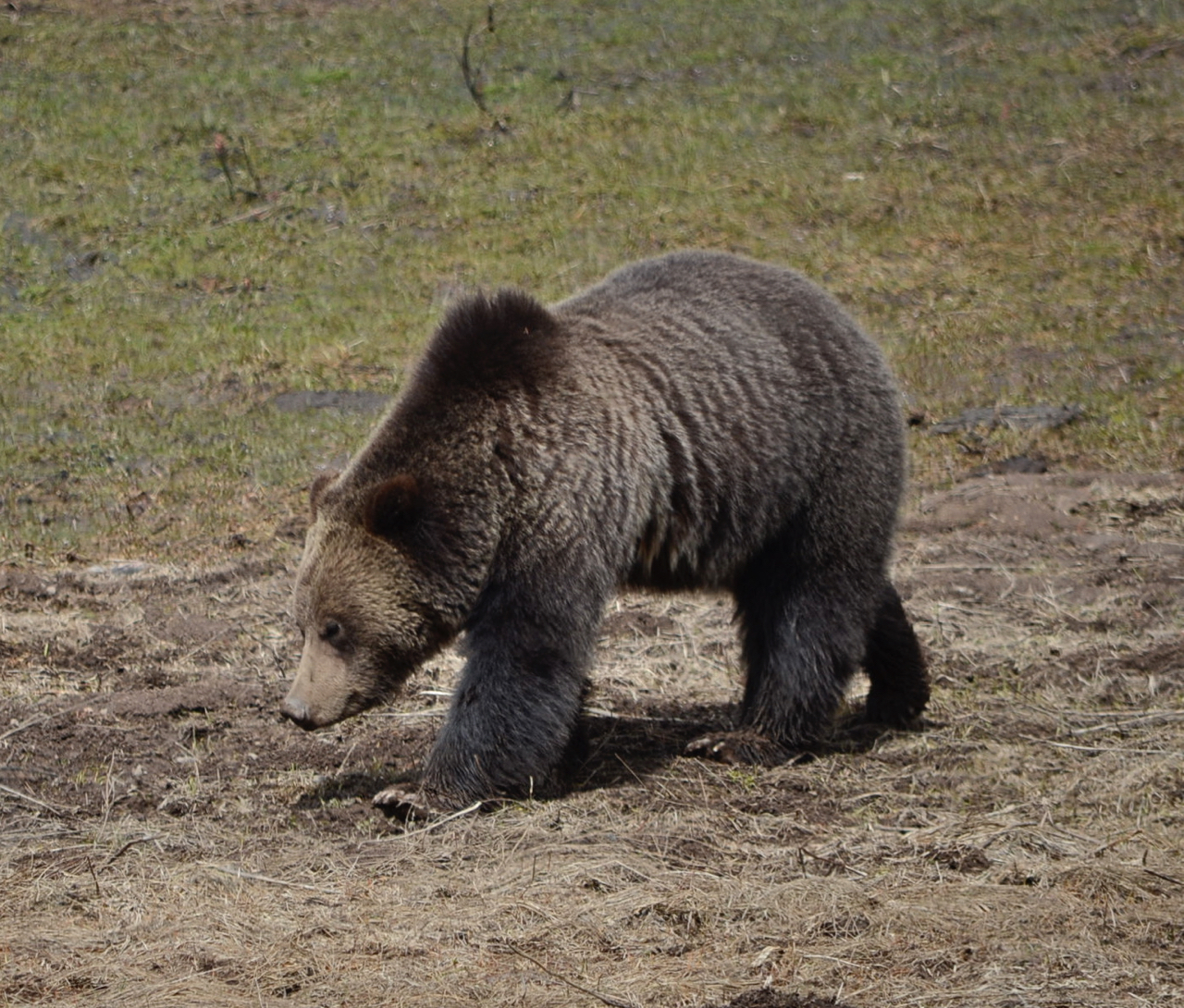
Grizzly bear, state mammal of Montana

There are 115 mammal species known to occur in Montana. Among Montana's mammals, three are listed as endangered or threatened and the Montana Department of Fish, Wildlife and Parks lists a number of species as species of concern.

Species are listed by common and scientific names, as per R. S. Hoffman and D. L. Pattie, A Guide to Montana Mammals, 1968.

== New World opossums (Order: Didelphimorphia) ==
Family: Didelphidae (true opossums)

- Virginia opossum, Didelpis virginiana introduced

== Lagomorphs (Order: Lagomorpha) ==
Family: Leporidae (rabbits and hares)

- Pygmy rabbit, Brachylagus idahoensis
- Snowshoe hare, Lepus americanus
- Black-tailed jackrabbit, Lepus californicus
- White-tailed jackrabbit, Lepus townsendii
- Desert cottontail, Sylvilagus audubonii
- Eastern cottontail, Sylvilagus floridanus
- Mountain cottontail, Sylvilagus nuttallii

Family: Ochotonidae (pikas)

- American pika, Ochotona princeps

== Even-toed ungulates (Order: Artiodactyla) ==
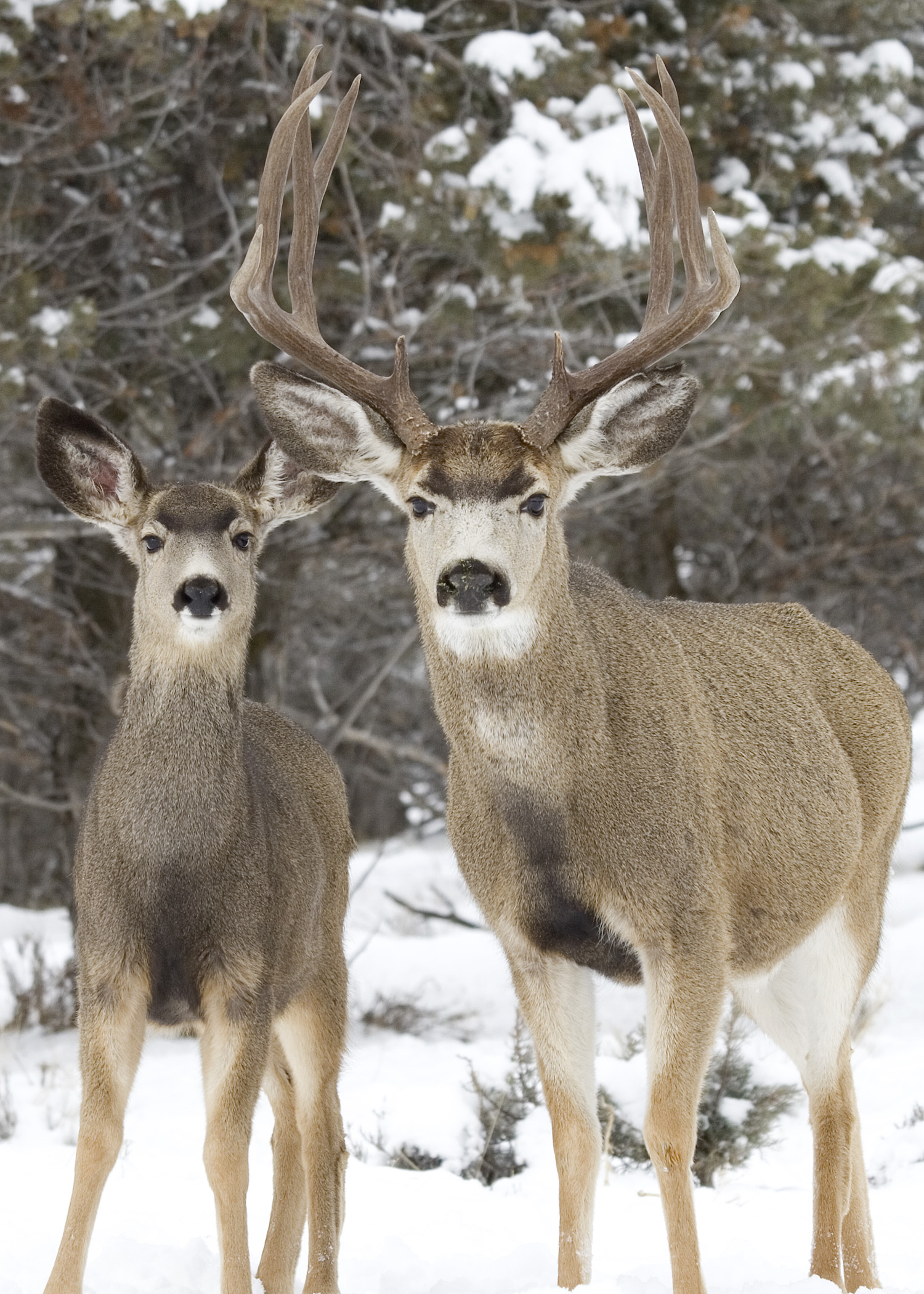
Mule deer

Family: Antilocapridae (pronghorns)

- Pronghorn, Antilocapra americana

Family: Bovidae (bovids)

- American bison, Bison bison
- Mountain goat, Oreamnos americanus
- Bighorn sheep, Ovis canadensis

Family: Cervidae (deer)

- Moose, Alces alces
- Elk, Cervus canadensis
- Caribou, Rangifer tarandus extirpated, vagrant
  - Boreal woodland caribou, R. t. caribou extirpated, vagrant
- Mule deer, Odocoileus hemionus
- White-tailed deer, Odocoileus virginianius

== Carnivorans (Order: Carnivora) ==
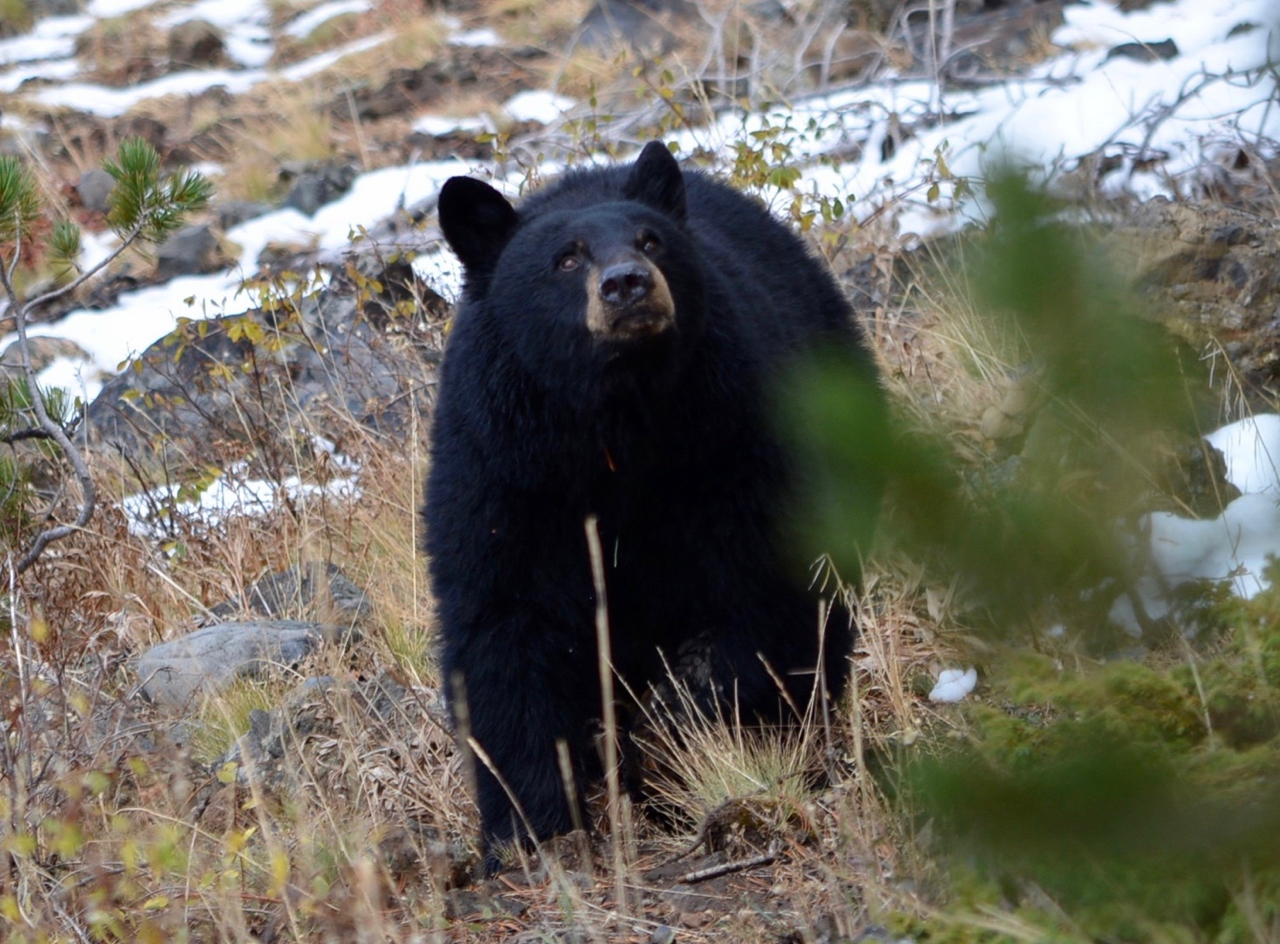
Black bear

Family: Ursidae (bears)

- American black bear, Ursus americanus
- Brown bear, Ursus arctos
  - Grizzly bear, U. a. horribilis

Family: Procyonidae (procyonids)

- Raccoon, Procyon lotor

Family: Felidae (cats)

- Canada lynx, Lynx canadensis
- Bobcat, Lynx rufus
- Cougar, Puma concolor

Family: Canidae (canids)

- Coyote, Canis latrans
- Gray wolf, Canis lupus
  - Northern Rocky Mountain wolf, C. l. irremotus
  - Great Plains wolf, C. l. nubilus extinct
  - Northwestern wolf, C. l. occidentalus introduced
- Gray fox, Urocyon cinereoargentus
- Swift fox, Vulpes velox
- Red fox, Vulpes vulpes

Family: Mustelidae (mustelids)

- Wolverine, Gulo gulo
- North American river otter, Lontra canadensis
- Pacific marten, Martes caurina
- Black-footed ferret, Mustela nigripes reintroduced
- Least weasel, Mustela nivalis
- American ermine, Mustela richardsonii
- Long-tailed weasel, Neogale frenata
- American mink, Neogale vison
- Fisher, Pekania pennanti
- American badger, Taxidea taxus

Family: Mephitidae (skunks)

- Striped skunk, Mephitis mephitis
- Western spotted skunk, Spilogale gracilis

== Bats (Order: Chiroptera) ==
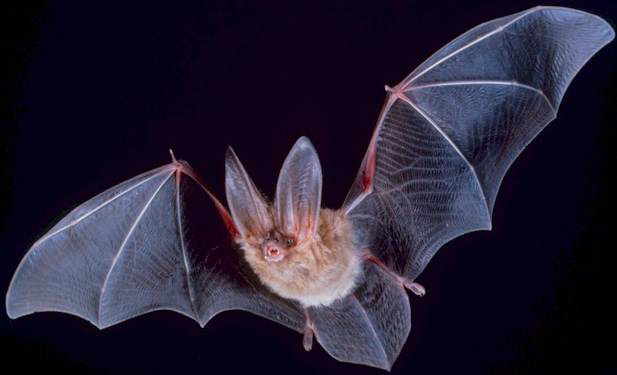
Townsend's big-eared bat

Family: Vespertilionidae (vesper bats)

- Pallid bat, Antrozous pallidus
- Townsend's big-eared bat, Corynorhinus townsendii
- Big brown bat, Eptesicus fuscus
- Spotted bat, Euderma maculatum
- Silver-haired bat, Lasionycteris noctivagans
- Eastern red bat, Lasiurus borealis
- Hoary bat, Lasiurus cinereus
- California myotis, Myotis californicus
- Western small-footed myotis, Myotis ciliolabrum
- Long-eared myotis, Myotis evotis
- Little brown bat, Myotis lucifugus
- Northern myotis, Myotis septentrionalis
- Fringed myotis, Myotis thysanodes
- Long-legged bat, Myotis volans

== Shrews (Order: Eulipotyphla) ==
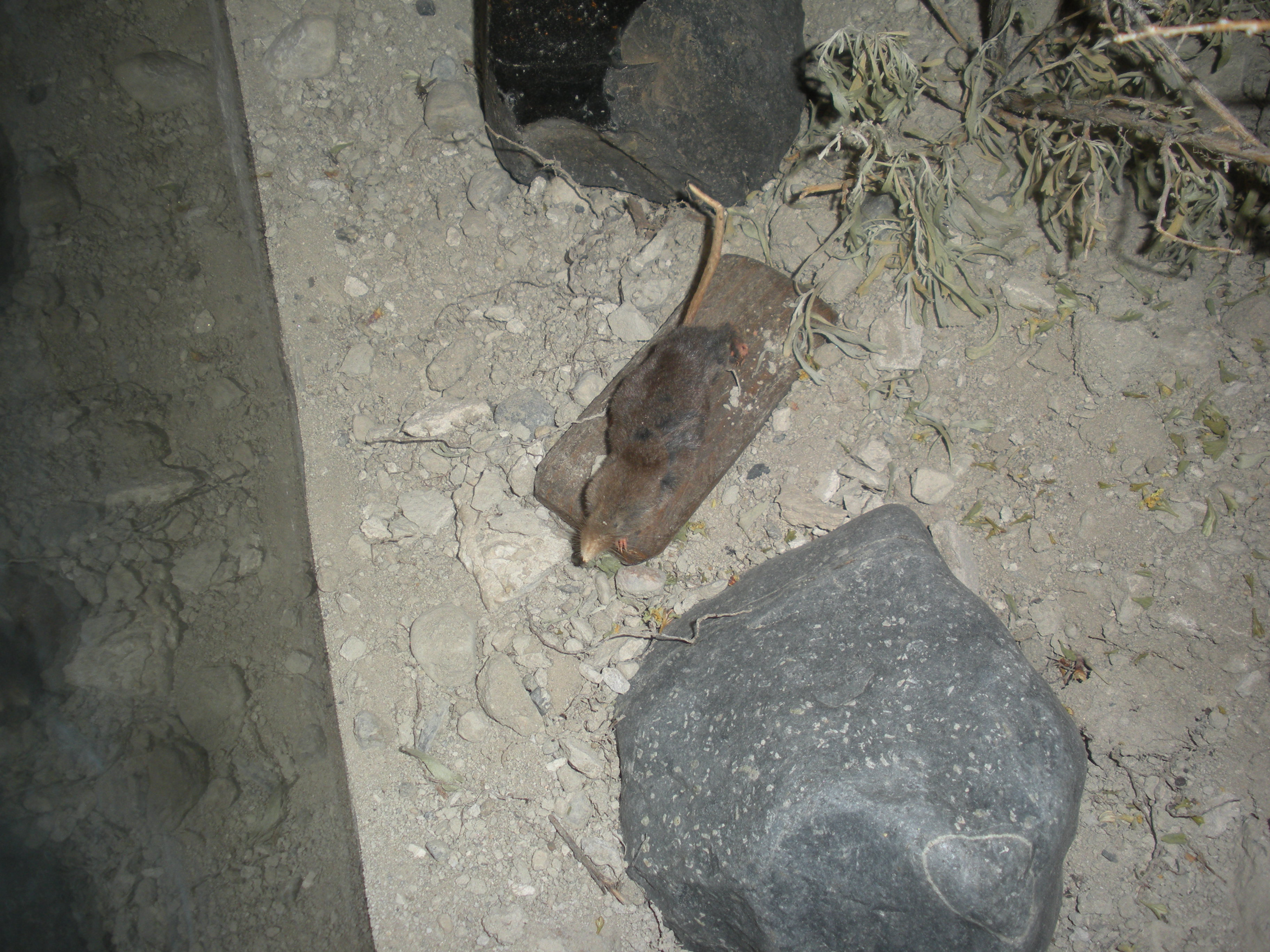
Merriam's shrew

Family: Soricidae

- Northern short-tailed shrew, Blarina brevicauda
- Arizona shrew, Sorex arcticus
- Cinereus shrew, Sorex cinereus
- Hayden's shrew, Sorex haydeni
- American pygmy shrew, Sorex hoyi
- Merriam's shrew, Sorex merriami
- Montane shrew, Sorex monticolus
- Dwarf shrew, Sorex nanus
- American water shrew, Sorex palustris
- Preble's shrew, Sorex preblei
- Vagrant shrew, Sorex vagrans

== Rodents (Order: Rodentia) ==
Family: Castoridae (beavers)

- North American beaver, Castor canadensis

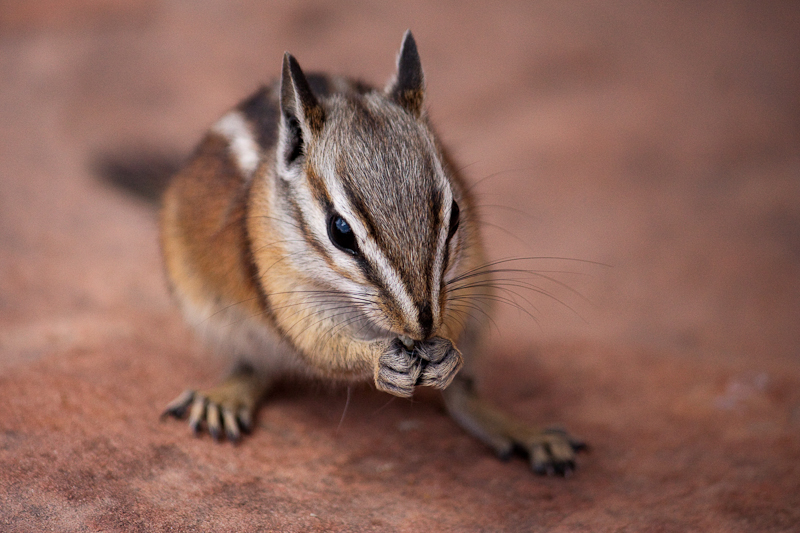
Uinta chipmunk

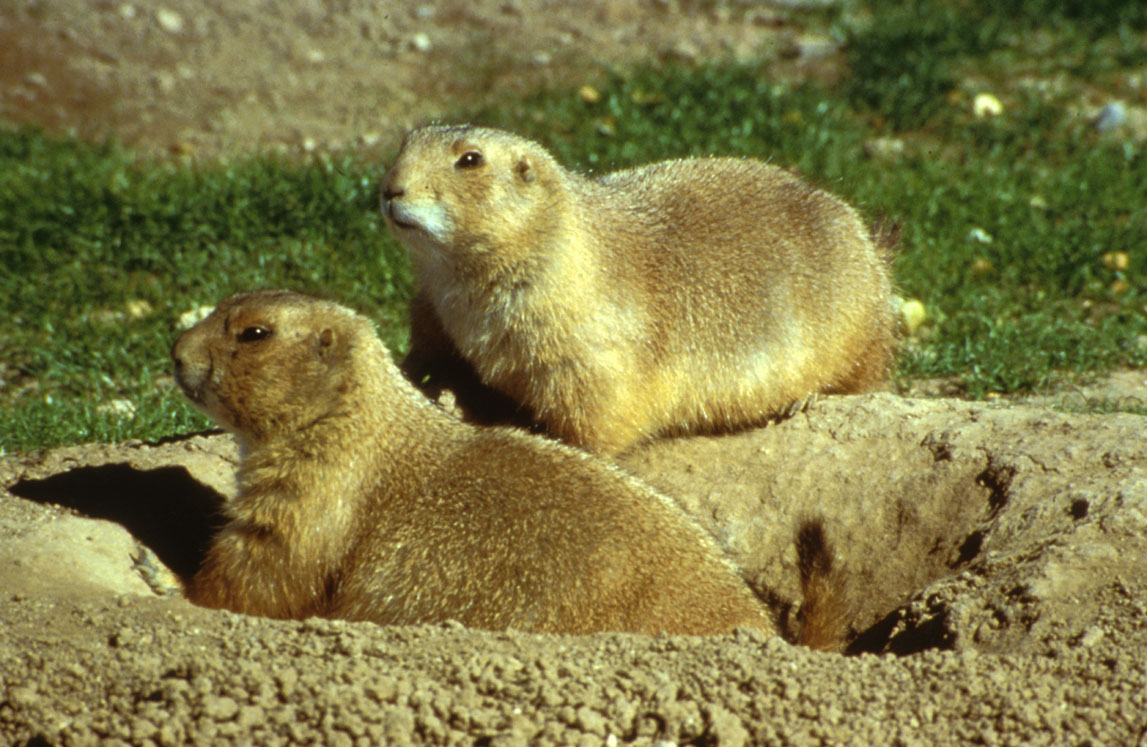
Black-tailed prairie dogs

Family: Sciuridae (squirrels)

- Golden-mantled ground squirrel, Callospermophilus lateralis
- White-tailed prairie dog, Cynomys leucurus
- Black-tailed prairie dog, Cynomys ludovicianus
- Northern flying squirrel, Glaucomys sabrinus
- Thirteen-lined ground squirrel, Ictidomys tridecemlineatus
- Hoary marmot, Marmota caligata
- Yellow-bellied marmot, Marmota flaviventris
- Yellow-pine chipmunk, Neotamias amoenus
- Least chipmunk, Neotamias minimus
- Red-tailed chipmunk, Neotamias ruficaudus
- Uinta chipmunk, Neotamias umbrinus
- Eastern gray squirrel, Sciurus carolinensis introduced
- Eastern fox squirrel, Sciurus niger
- American red squirrel, Tamiasciurus hudsonicus
- Uinta ground squirrel, Urocitellus armatus
- Columbian ground squirrel, Urocitellus columbianus
- Wyoming ground squirrel, Urocitellus elegans
- Richardson's ground squirrel, Urocitellus richardsonii

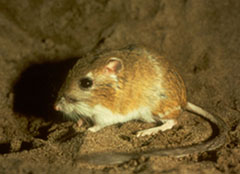
Ord's kangaroo rat

Family: Heteromyidae (pocket mice and kangaroo rats)

- Hispid pocket mouse, Chaetodipus hispidus
- Ord's kangaroo rat, Dipodomys ordii
- Olive-backed pocket mouse, Perognathus fasciatus
- Great Basin pocket mouse, Perognathus parvus

Family: Geomyidae (pocket gophers)

- Idaho pocket gopher, Thomomys idahoensis
- Northern pocket gopher, Thomomys talpoides

Family: Dipodidae (jumping mice)

- Meadow jumping mouse, Zapus hudsonius
- Western jumping mouse, Zapus princeps

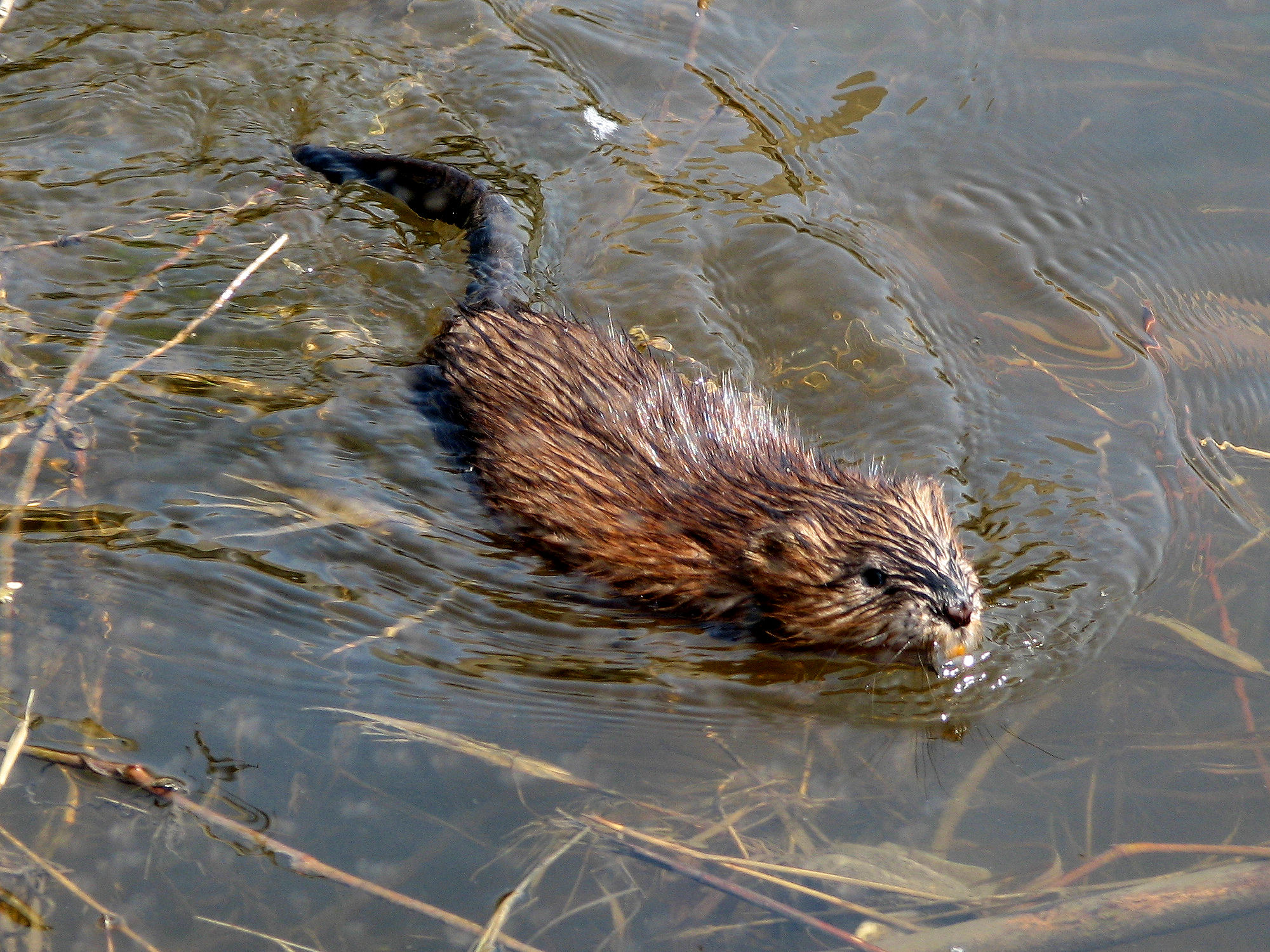
Muskrat

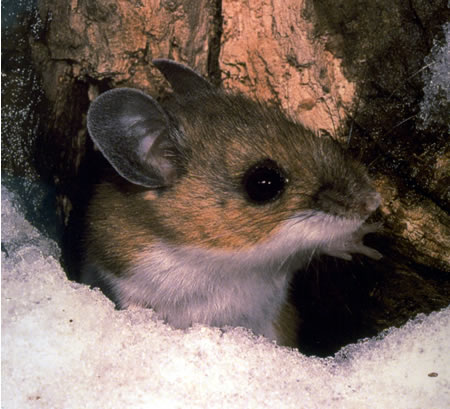
Deer mouse

Family: Cricetidae (New World mice and rats, voles, lemmings, muskrats)

- Sagebrush vole, Lemmiscus curtatus
- Long-tailed vole, Microtus longicaudus
- Montane vole, Microtus montanus
- Prairie vole, Microtus ochrogaster
- Meadow vole, Microtus pennsylvanicus
- Water vole, Microtus richardsoni
- Southern red-backed vole, Myodes gapperi
- Bushy-tailed woodrat, Neotoma cinerea
- Muskrat, Ondatra zibethicus
- Northern grasshopper mouse, Onychomys leucogaster
- White-footed mouse, Peromyscus leucopus
- Western deer mouse, Peromyscus sonoriensis
- Heather vole, Phenacomys intermedius
- Western harvest mouse, Reithrodontomys megalotis
- Northern bog lemming, Synaptomys borealis

Family: Muridae (Old World rats and mice)

- House mouse, Mus musculus introduced
- Norway rat, Rattus norvegicus introduced

Family: Echimyidae (spiny rats)

- Nutria, Myocastor coypus introduced

Family: Erethizontidae

- North American porcupine, Erethizon dorsatum

== See also ==
- Lists of mammals by region
- Amphibians and Reptiles of Montana
- Birds of Montana
