= 1908 United States presidential election in Connecticut =

- November 3, 1908

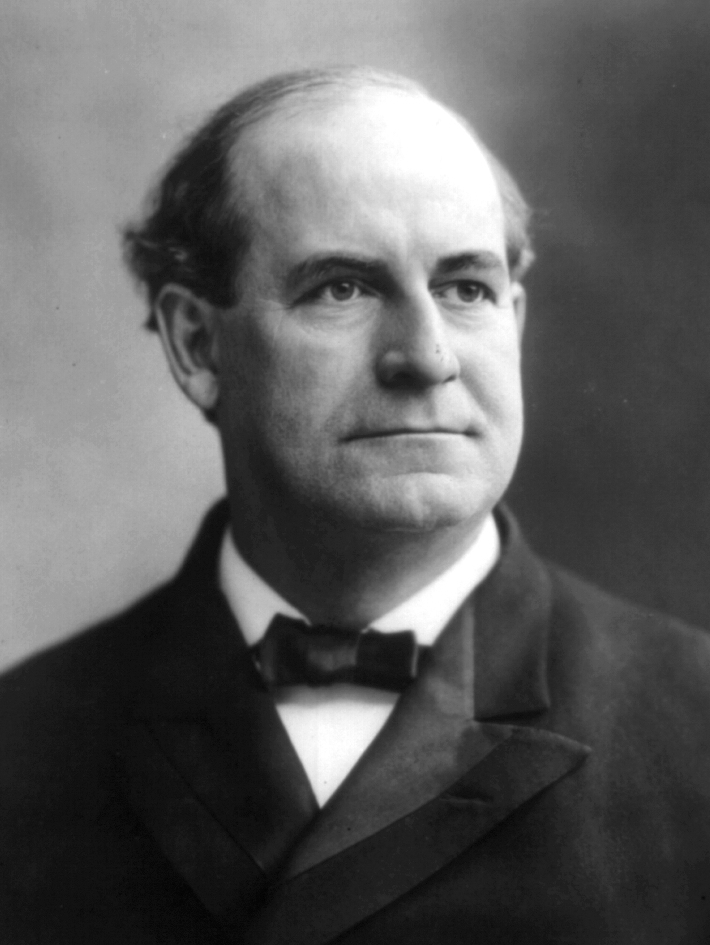
Nominee	William Howard Taft	William Jennings Bryan
Party	Republican	Democratic
Home state	Ohio	Nebraska
Running mate	James S. Sherman	John W. Kern
Electoral vote	7	0
Popular vote	112,915	68,255
Percentage	59.43%	35.92%

Taft
40–50%
50–60%
60–70%
70–80%
80–90%
90–100%
Bryan
40–50%
50–60%
President before election
Theodore Roosevelt
Republican
Elected President
William Howard Taft
Republican

The 1908 United States presidential election in Connecticut took place on November 3, 1908, as part of the 1908 United States presidential election. Voters chose seven representatives, or electors to the Electoral College, who voted for president and vice president.

Connecticut voted for the Republican nominees, Secretary of War William Howard Taft of Ohio and his running mate James S. Sherman of New York. They defeated the Democratic nominees, former U.S. Representative William Jennings Bryan of Nebraska and his running mate John W. Kern of Indiana. Taft won the state by a margin of 23.51%.

Bryan had previously lost Connecticut to William McKinley in both 1896 and 1900.

== Results ==
1908 United States presidential election in Connecticut
Party	Candidate	Running mate	Popular vote		Electoral vote	
Party	Candidate	Running mate	Count	%	Count	%
Republican	William Howard Taft of Ohio	James Schoolcraft Sherman of New York	112,915	59.43%	7	100.00%
Democratic	William Jennings Bryan of Nebraska	John Worth Kern of Indiana	68,255	35.92%	0	0.00%
Socialist	Eugene Victor Debs of Indiana	Benjamin Hanford of New York	5,113	2.69%	0	0.00%
Prohibition	Eugene Wilder Chafin of Illinois	Aaron Sherman Watkins of Ohio	2,380	1.25%	0	0.00%
Independence	Thomas Louis Hisgen of Massachusetts	John Temple Graves of Georgia	728	0.38%	0	0.00%
Socialist Labor	August Gillhaus of New York	Donald L. Munro of Virginia	608	0.31%	0	0.00%
N/A	Others	Others	4	0.01%	0	0.00%
Total			190,003	100.00%	7	100.00%

== See also ==
- United States presidential elections in Connecticut
