= 1908 United States presidential election =

Election of William Howard Taft

- November 3, 1908

483 members of the Electoral College 242 electoral votes needed to win
- Turnout: 65.7% (▲0.2 pp)

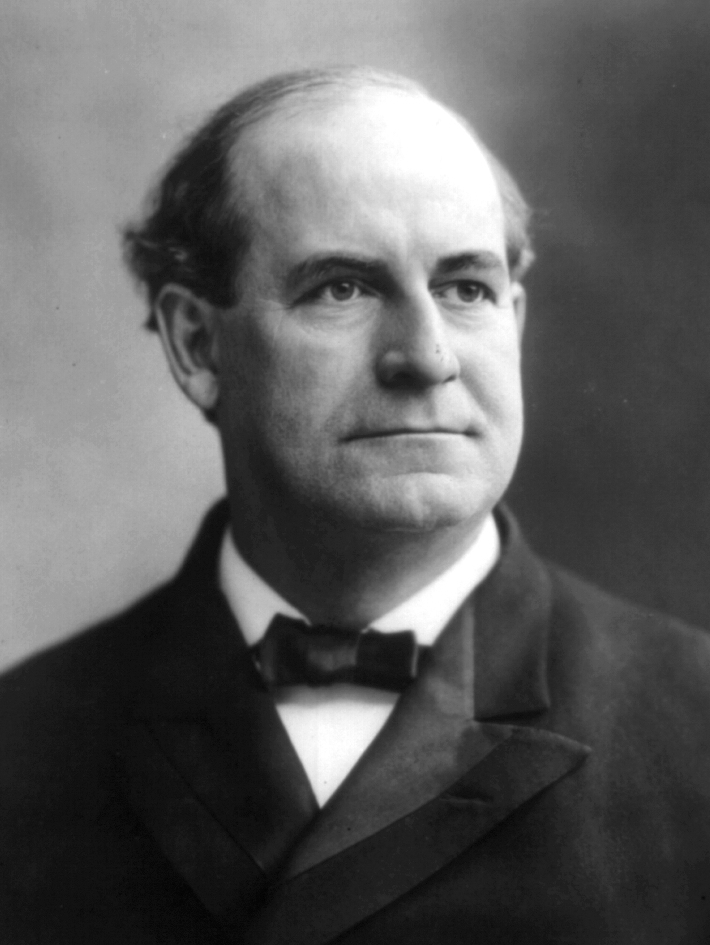
Nominee	William Howard Taft	William Jennings Bryan
Party	Republican	Democratic
Home state	Ohio	Nebraska
Running mate	James S. Sherman	John W. Kern
Electoral vote	321	162
States carried	29	17
Popular vote	7,678,395	6,408,984
Percentage	51.6%	43.1%
- Presidential election results map. Red denotes states won by Taft/Sherman, blue denotes those won by Bryan/Kern. Numbers indicate the number of electoral votes allotted to each state.
President before election
Theodore Roosevelt
Republican
Elected President
William Howard Taft
Republican

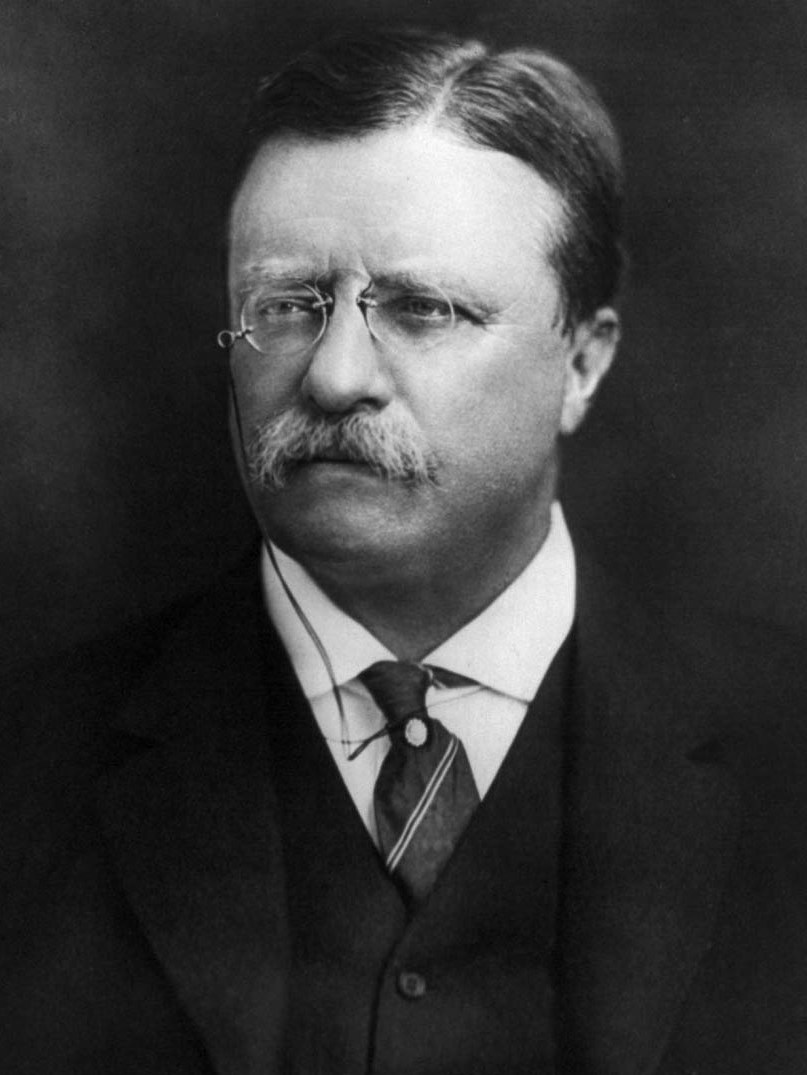
Theodore Roosevelt, the incumbent president in 1908, whose second and only full term expired on March 4, 1909

A presidential election was held in the United States on November 3, 1908. Republican Party nominee William Howard Taft defeated threetime Democratic nominee William Jennings Bryan. Incumbent President Theodore Roosevelt honored his promise not to seek a third term (for him, a second full term), and persuaded his close friend, Taft, to become his successor. With Roosevelt's support, Taft won the presidential nomination at the 1908 Republican National Convention on the first ballot. The Democratic Party nominated Bryan, who had been defeated twice previously, in 1896 and 1900, by Republican William McKinley.

Bryan, part of the more liberal or progressive wing of the Democratic Party, ran a campaign against the nation's business elite. Despite this, he suffered the worst loss of his three presidential campaigns in his percentage of both the popular vote and electoral vote. Taft won 51.6% of the popular vote and carried most states outside of the Solid South. Taft's triumph gave Republicans their fourth consecutive presidential election victory. The Republican Party lost the presidency four years later to the Democrats, due to a party split between Taft and Roosevelt. Two third-party candidates, Eugene V. Debs of the Socialist Party and Eugene W. Chafin of the Prohibition Party, each took over 1% of the popular vote. This would also be the last election before Arizona and New Mexico gained statehood on January 6 and February 14, 1912, respectively.

== Nominations ==
=== Republican Party nomination ===
==== Nominees ====
Republican Party (United States) 1908 Republican Party ticket
William Howard Taft	James S. Sherman
for President	for Vice President
42nd U.S. Secretary of War (1904–1908)	U.S. Representative for New York's 27th (1903–1909)

==== Candidates ====
Candidates in this section are sorted by delegates won
William H. Taft	Philander C. Knox	Charles E. Hughes	Joseph G. Cannon	Charles W. Fairbanks	Robert M. La Follette	Joseph B. Foraker	Leslie M. Shaw
42nd U.S. Secretary of War from Ohio (1904–1908)	44th U.S. Attorney General from Pennsylvania (1901–1904)	36th Governor of New York (1907–1910)	35th House Speaker from Illinois (1903–1911)	26th U.S. Vice President from Indiana (1905–1909)	U.S. Senator from Wisconsin (1906–1925)	U.S. Senator from Ohio (1897–1909)	43rd U.S. Secretary of the Treasury from Iowa (1902–1907)
Delegates: 549	Delegates: 67	Delegates: 54	Delegates: 46	Delegates: 32	Delegates: 25	Delegates: 5	Delegates: 0
Campaign					Campaign	Campaign	

Old Dr. Roosevelt - J.S. Pughe. (1908)

The Republican nomination contest marked the introduction of the presidential preference primary. The idea of the primary to nominate candidates was sponsored by anti-machine politicians such as New York Governor Charles Evans Hughes and Iowa Governor Albert B. Cummins. The first state to hold a presidential primary to select delegates to a national convention was Florida in 1904, when Democratic Party voters held a primary among uninstructed candidates for delegate. Early in 1908, the only two Republican contenders running nationwide campaigns for the presidential nomination were Secretary of War William Howard Taft and Senator Joseph B. Foraker, both of Ohio. In the nomination contest, four states held primaries to select national convention delegates. In Ohio, the state Republican Party held a primary on February 11. Candidates pledged to Taft were printed on the ballot in a Taft column, and candidates pledged to Foraker were printed in a column under his name. Taft won a resounding victory in Ohio. The three states holding primaries to select delegates without the preference component were split: California chose a slate of delegates that supported Taft; Wisconsin elected a slate that supported Wisconsin Senator Robert M. La Follette, Sr., and Pennsylvania elected a slate that supported its Senator Philander C. Knox.

The 1908 Republican Convention was held in Chicago between June 16 and 19. William Howard Taft was nominated with 702 votes to 68 for Knox, 67 for Hughes, 58 for Cannon, 40 for Fairbanks, 25 for La Follette, 16 for Foraker, 3 for President Roosevelt, and one abstention.

Presidential ballot
Candidate	1st	Unanimous
William Howard Taft	702	980
Philander C. Knox	68	-
Charles Evans Hughes	67	-
Joseph Gurney Cannon	58	-
Charles W. Fairbanks	40	-
Robert M. La Follette	25	-
Joseph B. Foraker	16	-
Theodore Roosevelt	3	-
Not Voting	1	-

Representative James S. Sherman from New York received the vice-presidential nomination.

Vice-presidential ballot
Candidate	1st	Unanimous
James S. Sherman	816	980
Franklin Murphy	77	-
Curtis Guild, Jr.	75	-
George L. Sheldon	10	-
Charles W. Fairbanks	1	-
Not Voting	1	-

=== Democratic Party nomination ===
==== Nominees ====
Democratic Party (United States) 1908 Democratic Party ticket
William Jennings Bryan	John W. Kern
for President	for Vice President
U.S. Representative for Nebraska's 1st congressional district (1891–1895)	Indiana State Senator (1893–1897)
Campaign

==== Candidates ====
Candidates in this section are sorted by delegates won
William J. Bryan	John A. Johnson	George Gray	Jesse R. Grant
U.S. Representative for Nebraska's 1st district (1891–1895)	16th Governor of Minnesota (1905–1909)	Federal Appeals Judge from Delaware (1899–1914)	Engineer and businessman from California
Delegates: 549	Delegates: 25	Delegates: 6	Delegates: 0
Campaign			

Convention vote
President		Vice President	
√ William J. Bryan	888.5 / Unanimous	√ John W. Kern	Unanimous
George Gray	59.5		
John A. Johnson	46		
Not Voting	8		

As the 1908 election approached, William Jennings Bryan was the front-runner for the Democratic presidential nomination. Bryan's most formidable challenger for the nomination was Minnesota Governor John Albert Johnson. Johnson's rags-to-riches story, honesty, reformist credentials, and ability to win in a heavily Republican state made him popular within the Democratic Party. In March, the Minnesota Democratic State Convention endorsed Johnson for president. By the end of June, however, Bryan had amassed more than the requisite two-thirds of the delegates needed for nomination.

The 1908 Democratic National Convention was held in Denver between July 7 and 10. Johnson, aware of the fact that Bryan's nomination was a foregone conclusion, released his delegates, thereby allowing Bryan to win the nomination on the first ballot.

Bryan left the choice of vice-president to the delegates. John W. Kern from Indiana was unanimously declared the candidate for vice-president without a formal ballot after the names of Charles A. Towne, Archibald McNeil, and Clark Howell were withdrawn from consideration. Kern was a former state senator (1893-1897) and two-time gubernatorial candidate (1900 and 1904).

In response to nomination of Bryan and Kern, The New York Times disparagingly pointed out that the Democratic national ticket was consistent because "a man twice defeated for the Presidency was at the head of it, and a man twice defeated for governor of his state was at the tail of it."

=== Third parties and independents ===
==== People's Party nomination ====
===== Nominees =====
1908 People's Party ticket
Thomas E. Watson	Samuel Williams
for President	for Vice President
U.S. Representative for Georgia's 10th district (1891–1893)	State Representative from Indiana (1885–1887)
Campaign

In 1904 the national People's Party (Populists) ticket fared fairly well. Its total was twice the party's total in the previous presidential election, and in ten states, it received over 1% of the vote. It also offered 47 candidates for the House of Representatives, though the only ones elected were cross-endorsed by one of the major parties. The party remained in fusion with either the Democrats or the Republicans in many states.

The following three years were a trying time for the party. When Democrats began to call for the nomination of Bryan in 1908, western Populist leader Thomas Tibbles announced that the People's Party would probably not support him since he had gone into the hands of the Eastern business interests. Two months later, Nebraska Democrats decided in their state convention to end fusion with the Populists, but they changed their mind after an all-night conference. In the midterm elections the party only offered 10 candidates for House, and the Kansas People's Party officially disbanded in December when that state party's leader announced that he was joining the Republicans.

By late 1907, many Populists were hoping that Thomas Watson would agree to run for president again. The previous three years had been unusual for Watson. He gave a speech to a gathering of farmers in Greensborough, Georgia and while preparing for supper, the house where he was staying was burned. In mid-1906, Watson called on Georgia Populists to vote for Hoke Smith for governor in the Democratic primary, which fueled speculation that Watson was thinking of returning to the Democrats. In early 1907, Watson started a network of Populist-leaning publications to keep the party's principles alive; Tibbles was chosen to serve as the chief editor. One month later, someone fired shots into the Watsons' house in Augusta. He had an altercation with an African-American porter on a train; when the porter said that he was unable to increase the train's speed, Watson hit the man in the face with the cap of his cane.

The People's Party National Committee met on November 26, 1907, to make preparations for the 1908 national convention. National chairman James Ferriss indicated that Thomas Watson was the front runner for the nomination, saying that the party hoped to forge an alliance with one or more of the other minor parties, including possibly the Independence League or the Prohibitionists. In early 1908, however, at least one member of the national committee believed that Senator Robert La Follette of Wisconsin would win the Populist nomination.

On the first day of the convention, the delegation from Nebraska worked to adjourn the convention; they had already decided to support Bryan if he became the Democratic nominee. They managed to delay the official organization of the convention all day. One of their delegates, A.M. Walling of Nebraska, told the New York Times "we shall bolt if the convention attempts to nominate Thomas E. Watson, or any one else. We are not alone, for we have assurances that Minnesota, Georgia, and possibly Michigan and Kansas will walk out when we do".

The convention was organized on the second day and completed all its relevant business. Watson supporters chose George A. Honnecker of New Jersey to serve as the permanent chairman, defeating the Bryan supporters' choice, Jacob Coxey. The platform called for inflation of the currency, public ownership of railroads, telephones, and telegraphs, labor legislation, and a ban on futures gambling. When the time for nominations began, a schism took place; Watson's name was placed in nomination, and the Nebraska delegation bolted. They were followed by T.J. Weighan, the sole delegate from Minnesota. Watson was then nominated for president; his running mate was Samuel Williams of Indiana.

==== Socialist Party nomination ====
===== Nominees =====
Socialist Party of America 1908 Socialist Party ticket
Eugene V. Debs	Benjamin Hanford
for President	for Vice President
State Representative from Indiana (1885–1887)	Printer and Labor Organizer from New York
Campaign

===== Candidates =====
Candidates in this section are sorted by convention vote
Eugene V. Debs	James F. Carey	Carl D. Thompson	Algie M. Simons	Max S. Hayes
Former State Senator from Indiana (1885–1889)	Former State Representative from Massachusetts (1899–1903)	State Representative from Wisconsin (1906–1908)	Former Editor of the International Socialist Review from Illinois (1900–1908)	Editor of the Cleveland Citizen from Ohio (1891–1940)
Delegates: 159	Delegates: 16; DTBN	Delegates: 14	Delegates: 9	Delegates: 0 DTBN

The radical members of the party supported giving the nomination to Bill Haywood. Debs' health was in question until Ben Hanford, a member of the New York delegation, read a letter from Debs stating that he was in good health and would give his support to whoever won the nomination. Seymour Stedman, an opponent of Debs, proposed Algie Martin Simons, who had the support of the right wing in the party, for the nomination. Victor L. Berger proposed Carl D. Thompson for the nomination and it was seconded by Winfield R. Gaylord and Carolyn Lloyd Strobell. James F. Carey was nominated by Ida Crouch-Hazlett. Max S. Hayes nomination was seconded by Alfred Wagenknecht. Phillip H. Callery nominated Debs on May 14, 1908, and it was seconded by John Spargo and he won the nomination on the first ballot with 159 votes out of the 198 cast. A motion by Berger and Stedman to make the selection unanimous was approved. Carey's name was put up for the vice-presidential nomination by the Massachusetts, Minnesota, and Montana delegations, but he declined to run, and Caleb Lipscomb too declined. Hanford won the vice-presidential selection with 106 votes on the first ballot, which was later made unanimous. Debs' campaign was managed by J. Mahlon Barnes. This was the first time that a candidate besides Debs had been nominated for the Socialist presidential nomination.

Lincoln Steffens initially believed that Debs was not suitable for the presidency, but later told Brand Whitlock, the mayor of Toledo, Ohio, to vote for Debs after Steffens interviewed Debs and Berger. Haywood fundraised for the purchase of a train, which had over 200,000 contributors, that was later named the Red Special. Debs' train left on August 30, 1908, and traveled over 9,000 miles and gave 187 speeches over twenty-five days. Twenty-two million copies of Appeal to Reason were distributed during the campaign and the newspaper gained 50,000 subscribers.

Theodore Roosevelt believed that the Socialists would take progressive votes away from Taft and stated that Debs' speeches were "mere pieces of the literature of criminal violence". Samuel Gompers, the president of the American Federation of Labor and who had endorsed Bryan, criticized Debs, accusing him of receiving secret funding for his train from the Republicans. The Socialists published the names of every contributor to the train fund and the amount they donated, and also challenged Gompers to a debate, but he refused. Former President Grover Cleveland, and the Chicago Tribune, predicted that the Socialists would receive over one million votes.

Debs hoped to receive over a million votes, but only received 420,852 votes which was a 20,000 vote increase from the 1904 election. Debs stated that the reason for the small increase was due to Democrats who had supported him in 1904 over Parker had voted for Bryan and that those who remained were pure socialist votes.

Presidential ballot	1st ballot	2nd ballot	Vice-presidential ballot	1st ballot	2nd ballot
Eugene V. Debs	159	Unanimous	Ben Hanford	106	Unanimous
James F. Carey	16		Seymour Stedman	42	
Carl D. Thompson	14		May Wood Simons	20	
Algie Martin Simons	9		John W. Slayton	15	
			Caleb Lipscomb	1	
			George W. Woodbey	1	
Reference					

==== Socialist Labor Party Nomination ====
===== Nominees =====
1908 Socialist Labor Party Ticket
August Gillhaus	Donald L. Munro
for President	for Vice President
Engineer from New York	Machinist from Virginia

The Socialist Labor Party met in New York City from July 2 to July 5 in Arlington Hall, St. Mark's Place. While increasingly dwarfed by the growing membership of the Socialist Party led by Eugene Debs and Bill Haywood, Daniel De Leon and his compatriots remained committed to maintaining their separate course, considering Debs and his platform to be "reactionary". An attempt was made to depose Leon from his position of editor of the Party's papers in favor of a more moderate candidate, for fear that Leon's writings were alienating voters who might otherwise be sympathetic to their cause. The report was overwhelmingly voted down after Leon spoke in defense of his conduct as the Party's editor, with a rival report being adopted praising his leadership. When it came time for the nominations, Leon personally nominated Martin Preston of Nevada, who was currently serving a twenty-five-year sentence for the murder of Anton Silva. While noting that Preston was only 32 at the time, Leon remarked that "it was for the working people to elect Preston, and if he was elected he would be seated". Preston's nomination was ratified unanimously, with Donald Munro of Virginia winning in a contest against Arthur S. Dower of Texas for the vice presidential nomination. The nominations were later formalized at Cooper Union following the close of the convention.

Only days later, however, Martin Preston replied in a telegram that he could not accept the Presidential nomination, a declination that had not been expected nor prepared for. August Gillhaus of New York was later nominated in Preston's stead.

==== Prohibition Party nomination ====
===== Nominees =====
1908 Prohibition Party ticket
Eugene W. Chafin	Aaron S. Watkins
for President	for Vice President
Attorney at Law from Illinois	Professor and Methodist Minister from Ohio
Campaign

The Prohibition Party met in Columbus, Ohio, on July 14 and 15 to nominate its presidential ticket. Eugene Chafin was nominated on the third ballot in an open contest. When the runner-up for the Presidential nomination William Palmore, a Methodist Minister from Missouri and Editor of the St. Louis Christian Advocate, declined his nomination for the Vice Presidency, the convention hurriedly allowed for a new set of nominations and another ballot. Aaron Watkins of Ohio would win a majority on the first ballot.

Convention vote
President (Note)					Vice President			
Candidate	1st	2nd	3rd	Unanimous	Candidate	Unanimous	1st	Unanimous
√ Eugene W. Chafin	195	376	636	1,087	√ Aaron S. Watkins	-	?	1,087
William A. Palmore	273	418	415	-	William A. Palmore	1,087	-	-
Alfred L. Manierre	159	121	4	-	T. B. Demaree	-	?	-
Daniel R. Sheen	124	157	12	-	Charles S. Holler	-	?	-
Joseph P. Tracy	105	81	7	-	-	-	-	-
Frederick F. Wheeler	72	73	-	-	-	-	-	-
Oliver W. Stewart	61	47	-	-	-	-	-	-
James B. Cranfill	28	-	-	-	-	-	-	-
George R. Stewart	7	-	-	-	-	-	-	-
Charles Scanlon	1	-	-	-	-	-	-	-

==== Independence Party nomination ====
===== Nominees =====
1908 Independence Party ticket
Thomas L. Hisgen	John T. Graves
for President	for Vice President
CEO of Hisgen Brothers from Massachusetts (1888–1927)	Newspaper Editor from Georgia

===== Candidates =====
Candidates in this section are sorted by highest convention vote
Thomas L. Hisgen	John Temple Graves	Milford W. Howard	Reuben R. Lyon	William R. Hearst	William J. Bryan
CEO of Hisgen Brothers from Massachusetts (1888–1927)	Newspaper editor from Georgia	Former U.S. Representative for Alabama's 7th district (1895–1899)	Attorney at Law from New York	Former U.S. Representative for New York's 11th district (1903–1907)	Former U.S. Representative for Nebraska's 1st district (1891–1895)
Delegates: 831	Delegates: 213	Delegates: 200	Delegates: 71; NW: Before 2nd ballot	Delegates: 49; DTBN	Delegates: 0 NR

Disappointed with his performance in the 1904 Democratic presidential nomination campaign, and disillusioned as to his chances of successfully attaining it in 1908, William Randolph Hearst decided to run instead on the ticket of a third party of his own making. Originally borne from the Municipal Ownership League, a vehicle for Hearst's ultimately unsuccessful bid for the mayoralty of New York in 1905, it was Hearst's intention to fuse it with the remnants of the Populist Party led by Thomas Watson, a former Representative from Georgia who had been its presidential nominee in 1904. However, these intentions were dashed when every candidate that the Independence Party put forth in elections held in New York was elected except Hearst himself, despite an endorsement by the Democratic Party. Devastated, Hearst declared his intention never again to be a candidate.

While Hearst would no longer be the nominee, he fully intended to exercise influence at the Independence Party's convention; the platform itself was in large part a statement of his own views. With its candidates nominated, the party's purpose was changed from being a path for Hearst's presidential ambitions to being an instrument of his wrath. Through the influence of his papers and generous financial donations, Hearst hoped that the Independence ticket would draw away votes from William Jennings Bryan and lead to his defeat by Taft; this personal vendetta stemmed from Bryan failing to support Hearst's own bid for the Presidency in 1904.

Presidential ballot
Candidate	1st	2nd	3rd
Thomas L. Hisgen	396	590	831
John T. Graves	213	189	7
Milford W. Howard	200	109	38
Reuben R. Lyon	71	0	0
William R. Hearst	49	49	2

== General election ==
=== Campaign ===
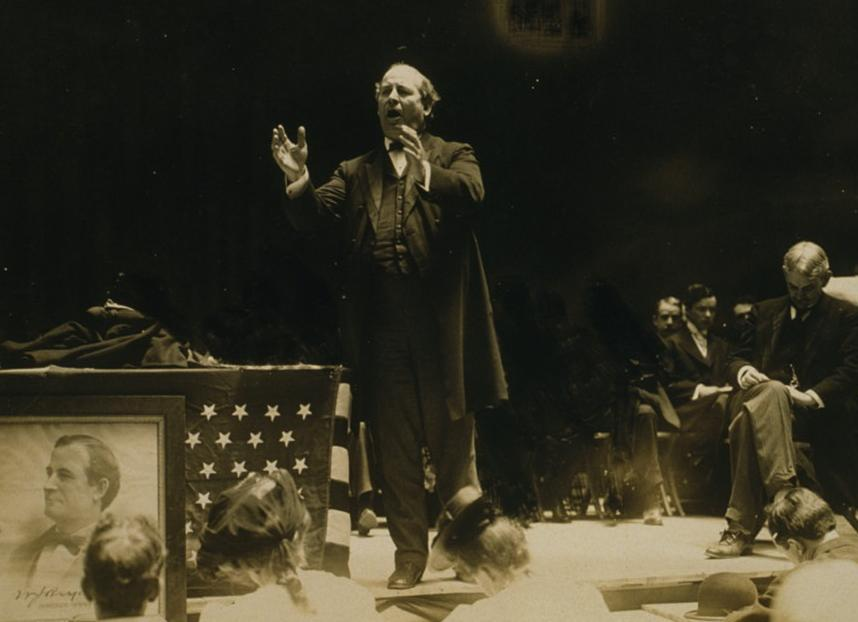
The balding "Boy Orator of the Platte" delivers a speech.

With the Free Silver issue no longer dominant, Bryan campaigned on a progressive platform attacking "government by privilege." His campaign slogan, "Shall the People Rule?", was featured on numerous posters and campaign memorabilia. However, Taft undercut Bryan's liberal support by accepting some of his reformist ideas, and Roosevelt's progressive policies blurred the distinctions between the parties. Republicans also used the slogan "Vote for Taft now, you can vote for Bryan anytime", a sarcastic reference to Bryan's two failed previous presidential campaigns.

Taft at Waterloo, Iowa (1908)

Taft trip, Ada, Minn. (Minnesota) (1908)

The Socialist candidate, Eugene Debs, embarked on an ambitious whistle-stop tour aboard a train nicknamed the Red Special, giving speeches regarding the Socialist cause across the country. The exertion of the tour exhausted Debs, and at certain points his brother Theodore - who bore a great resemblance to Eugene - substituted for him to allow the candidate to rest.

Businessmen continued to support the Republican Party, and Bryan failed to secure the support of labor. As a result, Bryan ended up with the worst of his three defeats in the national popular vote. He lost almost all the northern states to Taft and the popular vote by 8 percentage points.

This would be Bryan's last campaign for the presidency, although he would remain a popular figure within the Democratic Party and in 1912 would play a key role in securing the presidential nomination for Woodrow Wilson. Charles W. Bryan, William's brother, would become the (losing) Democratic nominee for Vice President in 1924. Bryan's 162 electoral votes from this election, combined with his 155 and 176 electoral votes from 1900 and 1896 respectively, make him the person with the most electoral votes never to be president.

=== Results ===
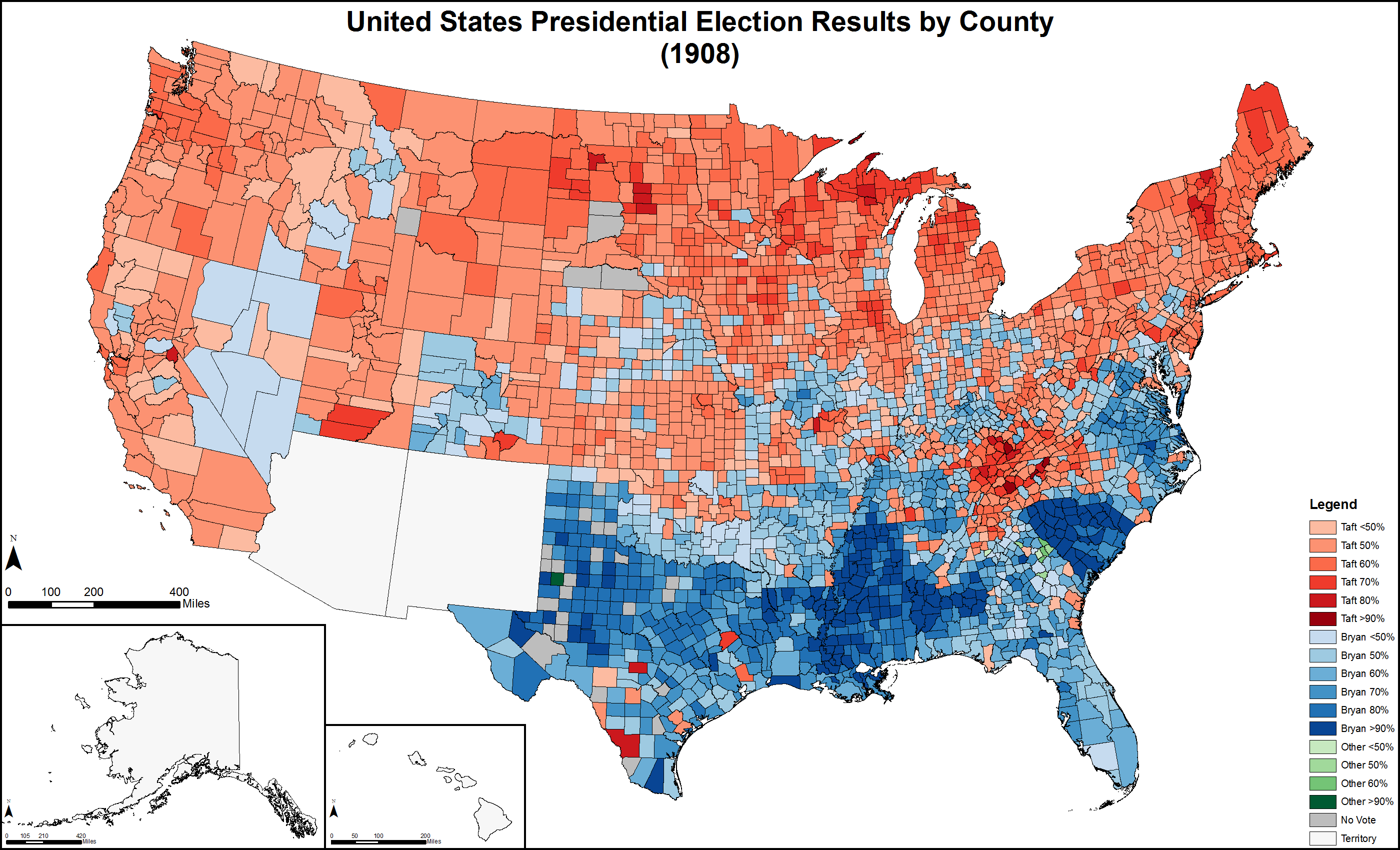
Results by county explicitly indicating the percentage for the winning candidate. Shades of red are for Taft (Republican), shades of blue are for Bryan (Democratic), shades of green are for "Other(s)" (Non-Democratic/Non-Republican), grey indicates zero recorded votes, and white indicates territories not elevated to statehood.

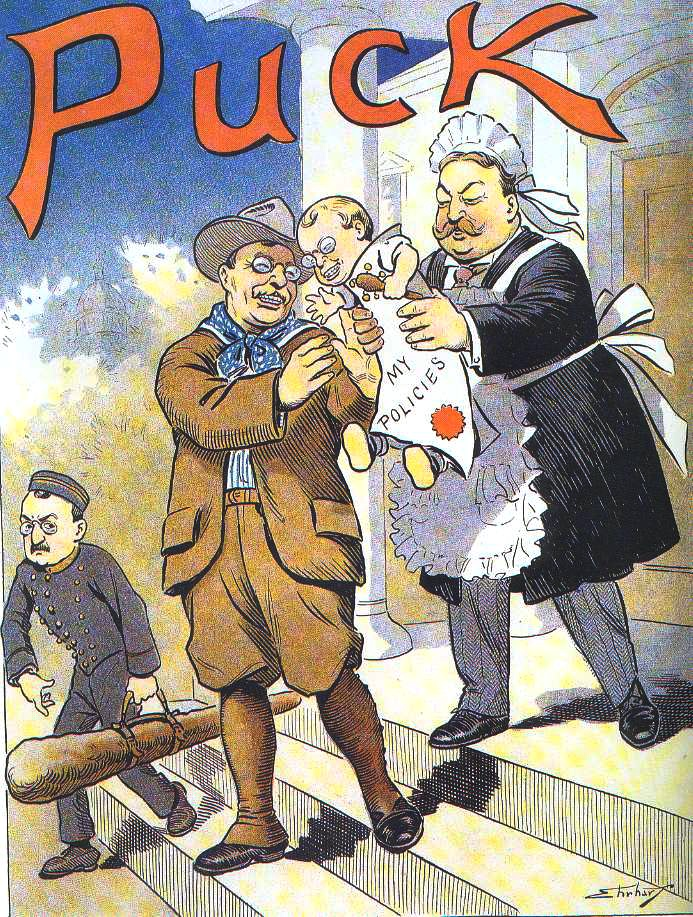
Roosevelt handing over his policies to his political protégé, William H. Taft.

Turnout in the election was 65.7%, with 29.8% of the voting age population participating in the election. Forty-six states participated, as Oklahoma had joined the Union less than a year prior to the ballot. Bryan won forty-eight counties in the new state of Oklahoma. The most important increase in the number of counties carried by Bryan was in the West South Central section, in part due to the vote of newly admitted Oklahoma.

Of the 2,858 counties making returns, Taft won in 1,494 (52.27%) while Bryan carried 1,355 (47.41%). Nine (0.31%) counties recorded more votes cast for "Other(s)" than either of the two main party candidates, whilst twenty-eight counties (0.97%) recorded zero votes due to being inhabited either by Native Americans who would not gain full citizenship for sixteen years, or by disenfranchised southern African-Americans. Taft had a majority in 1,325 counties, while Bryan had a majority in 1,204 counties.

By carrying 1,355 counties, Bryan won more counties than he had in 1900 (1,340), but he did not reach or surpass the number of counties he had won in 1896 (1,559). Bryan won more counties than McKinley in 1896, but failed to carry more counties than the Republican candidate in 1900 or 1904. Compared with his strength in previous elections, however, Bryan carried 69 counties in 1908 which had not been Democratic in either 1896 or 1900.

Bryan increased the area carried by Democrats in every part of the country except New England and the South. He doubled the number of Democratic counties in Wisconsin and won more counties in Indiana than were carried by plurality vote by the Democrats in any election in the Fourth Party System except 1912. He made decided gains in Missouri and in his home state of Nebraska, besides achieving notable victories in Colorado and Nevada. However, in four Western states (Washington, Oregon, Wyoming, and North Dakota), there was not one Democratic county. This was true likewise of Michigan, Delaware, and each of the New England states.

The total vote increased greatly, by more than a million vis-à-vis 1904. The major parties shared very unequally in the increase: whereas Taft had nearly 50,000 more than Theodore Roosevelt, Bryan had nearly 1,500,000 more votes than Alton Parker had garnered, and more than in either of his previous campaigns.

The eleven states of the former Confederacy provided 6.55% of Taft's votes, with him taking 31.71% of the vote in that region. It was noticeable that the "other" vote was only about seven thousand less than four years earlier. The "other" vote was a plurality in nine counties in the states of Georgia and Texas.

The size of the vote cast for the defeated Bryan in 1908 is clear evidence of perhaps the most striking feature of the American presidential vote. In this third attempt at the presidency, and in an election following one in which the nominee of his party polled only five million votes, Bryan had heavy support in every section of the country, and in every state. Moreover, nearly two-thirds of the vote cast for Bryan was from the fifteen states of the (Northeastern) Mid-Atlantic, East North Central, and West North Central sections, in which the Democratic candidate carried only one state (Nebraska).

Despite all conclusions as to predominant sentiment in the different sections and its economic, social, and political causes, there was a national vote cast for Bryan, and it was urban as well as rural; it was eastern, western, southern, and northern. Everywhere the Democratic Party was the minority party, and it was not hopeless, nor was it helpless. It was the agency for the expression of the opposition of almost six and a half million voters. According to Historian George E. Mowry:

What was especially significant in the election was the continued growth in the strength of the Democratic party and the success of the so-called progressive Republican candidates in the Midwest. The Republicans had not only lost seats in the House of Representatives but they had also lost governors in Ohio, Indiana, Minnesota, and North Dakota, all of which voted for Taft. In Wisconsin, Iowa, Nebraska, and even in Kansas self-announced progressive Republicans, who had previously defeated conservatives in the primaries, were more successful in beating their Democratic rivals. The election, The New York Times reported, had been punctuated with "independent voting". A closer analysis of the returns indicated that the voter in the Midwest had expressed his independence mostly from standpat Republicanism symbolized by the control of Speaker Cannon in the House and Aldrich in the Senate.

As of 2024, this is the most recent of only two elections in which Kansas and Nebraska did not vote for the same candidate, (Note: The other was in 1892 when Kansas voted for Populist James B. Weaver and Nebraska for Republican Benjamin Harrison.) the most recent in which Nebraska voted differently from both Kansas and North Dakota, and the most recent in which a Republican won the presidency without winning Nebraska. Bryan was the fifth of eight presidential nominees to win a significant number of electoral votes in at least three elections, the others being Thomas Jefferson, Henry Clay, Andrew Jackson, Grover Cleveland, Franklin D. Roosevelt, Richard Nixon, and Donald Trump. Of these, Jackson, Cleveland, and Roosevelt also won the popular vote in at least three elections. Clay and Bryan are the only two candidates to have lost three presidential elections.

The 162 electoral votes received by Bryan, added to the 155 electoral votes he received in 1900, and the 176 electoral votes he received in 1896, gave him the most total electoral votes received by any candidate who was never elected to the office of president (493), and the 16th largest number of electoral votes received by any candidate behind Andrew Jackson's 496, Ulysses S. Grant's 500, Herbert Hoover's 503, George W. Bush's 557, William McKinley's 563, George H. W. Bush's 594, Grover Cleveland's 664, Barack Obama's 697, Woodrow Wilson's 712, Bill Clinton's 749, Donald Trump's 848, Dwight Eisenhower's 899, Ronald Reagan's 1,015, Richard Nixon's 1,040 and Franklin D. Roosevelt's 1,876 total electoral votes.

Electoral results
Presidential candidate	Party	Home state	Popular vote		Electoral vote	Running mate		
Presidential candidate	Party	Home state	Count	Percentage	Electoral vote	Vice-presidential candidate	Home state	Electoral vote
William Howard Taft	Republican	Ohio	7,678,335	51.57%	321	James S. Sherman	New York	321
William Jennings Bryan	Democratic	Nebraska	6,408,979	43.04%	162	John W. Kern	Indiana	162
Eugene V. Debs	Socialist	Indiana	420,852	2.83%	0	Benjamin Hanford	New York	0
Eugene W. Chafin	Prohibition	Illinois	254,087	1.71%	0	Aaron S. Watkins	Ohio	0
Thomas L. Hisgen	Independence	Massachusetts	82,574	0.55%	0	John Temple Graves	Georgia	0
Thomas E. Watson	Populist	Georgia	28,862	0.19%	0	Samuel Williams	Indiana	0
August Gillhaus	Socialist Labor	New York	14,031	0.09%	0	Donald L. Munro	Virginia	0
Other			1,519	0.01%	—	Other		—
Total			14,889,239	100%	483			483
Needed to win					242			242

Source (Popular Vote): Leip, David. "1908 Presidential Election Results". Dave Leip's Atlas of U.S. Presidential Elections.

Source (Electoral Vote): "Electoral College Box Scores 1789–1996". National Archives and Records Administration.

Popular vote
Taft	51.57%
Bryan	43.04%
Debs	2.83%
Chafin	1.71%
Others	0.85%

Electoral vote
Taft	66.46%
Bryan	33.54%

=== Geography of results ===
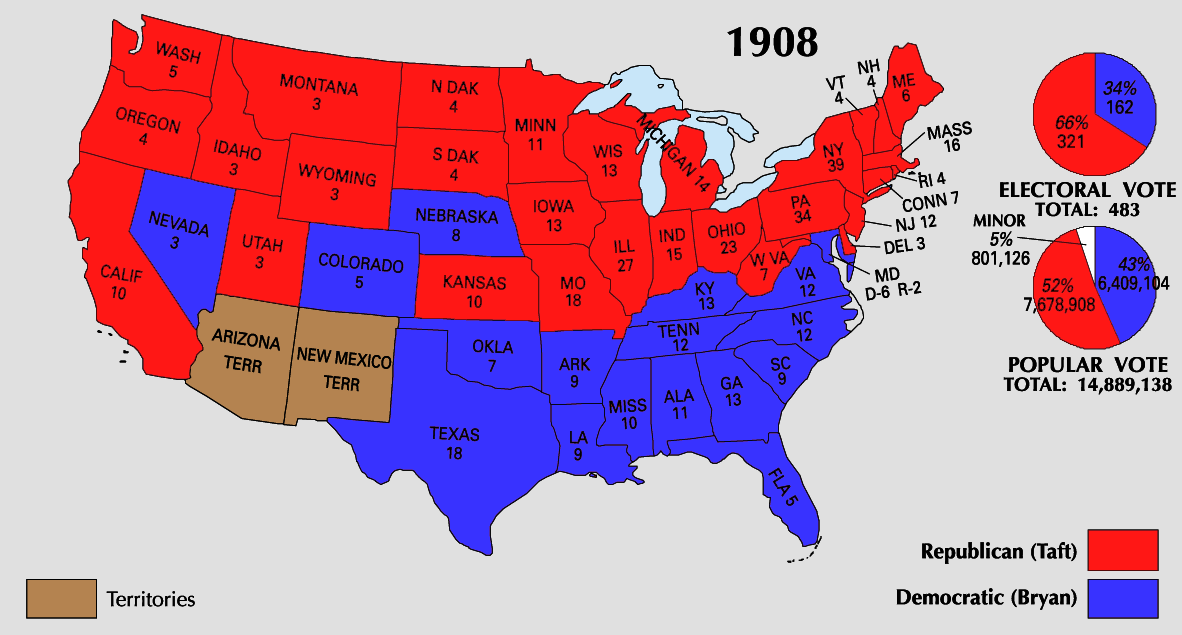

Results by county, shaded according to winning candidate's percentage of the vote

==== Cartographic gallery ====
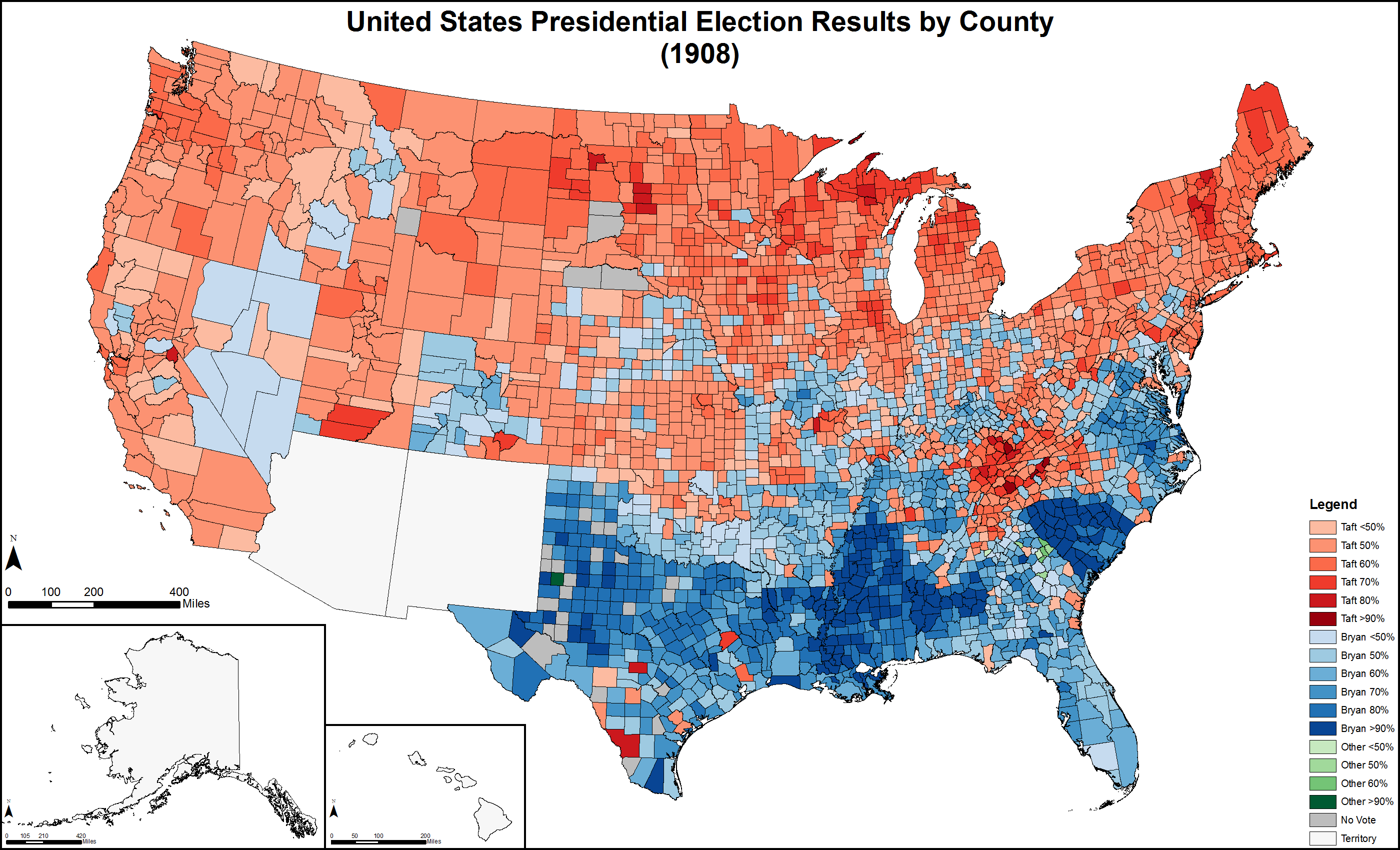
Map of presidential election results by county

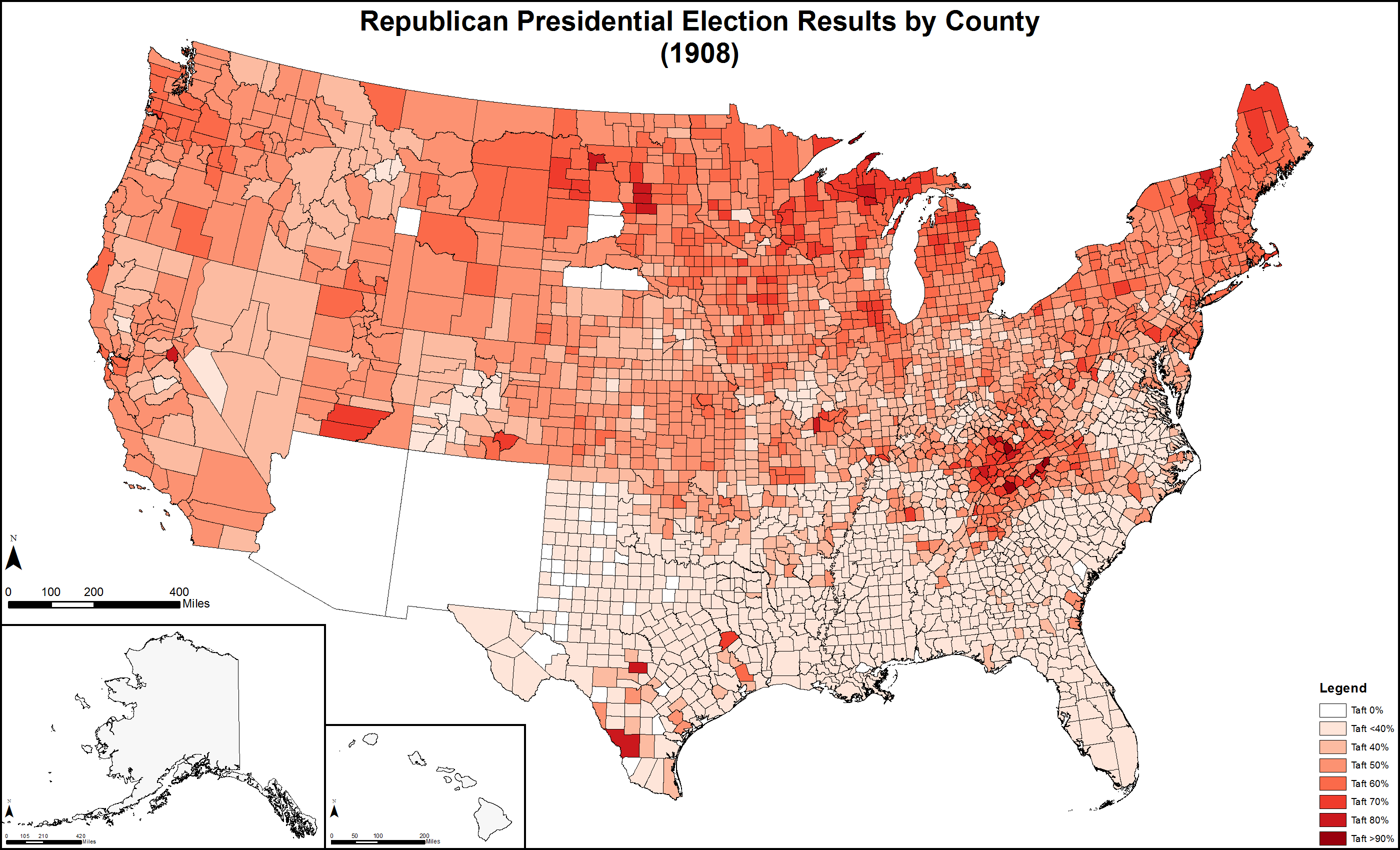
Map of Republican presidential election results by county

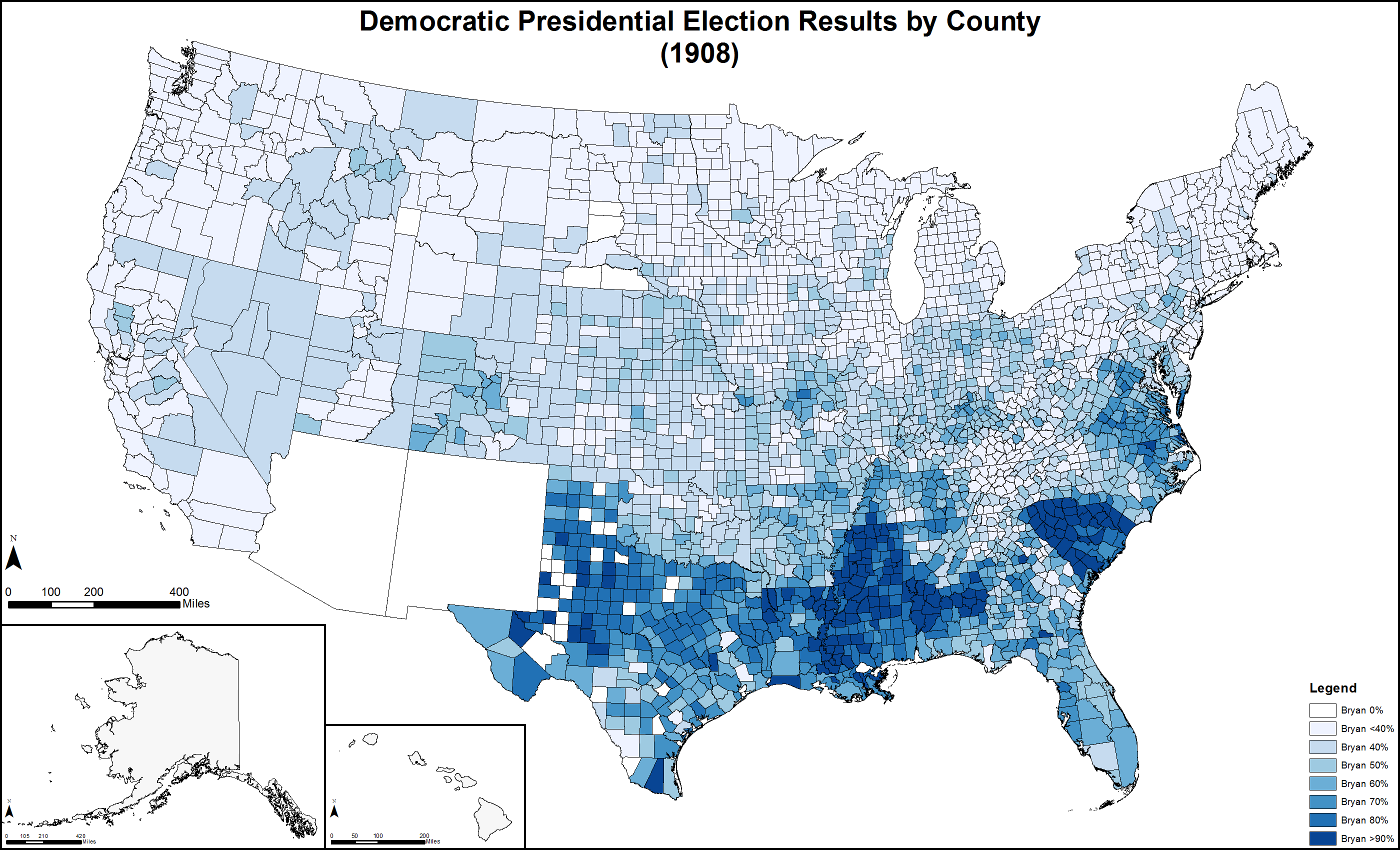
Map of Democratic presidential election results by county

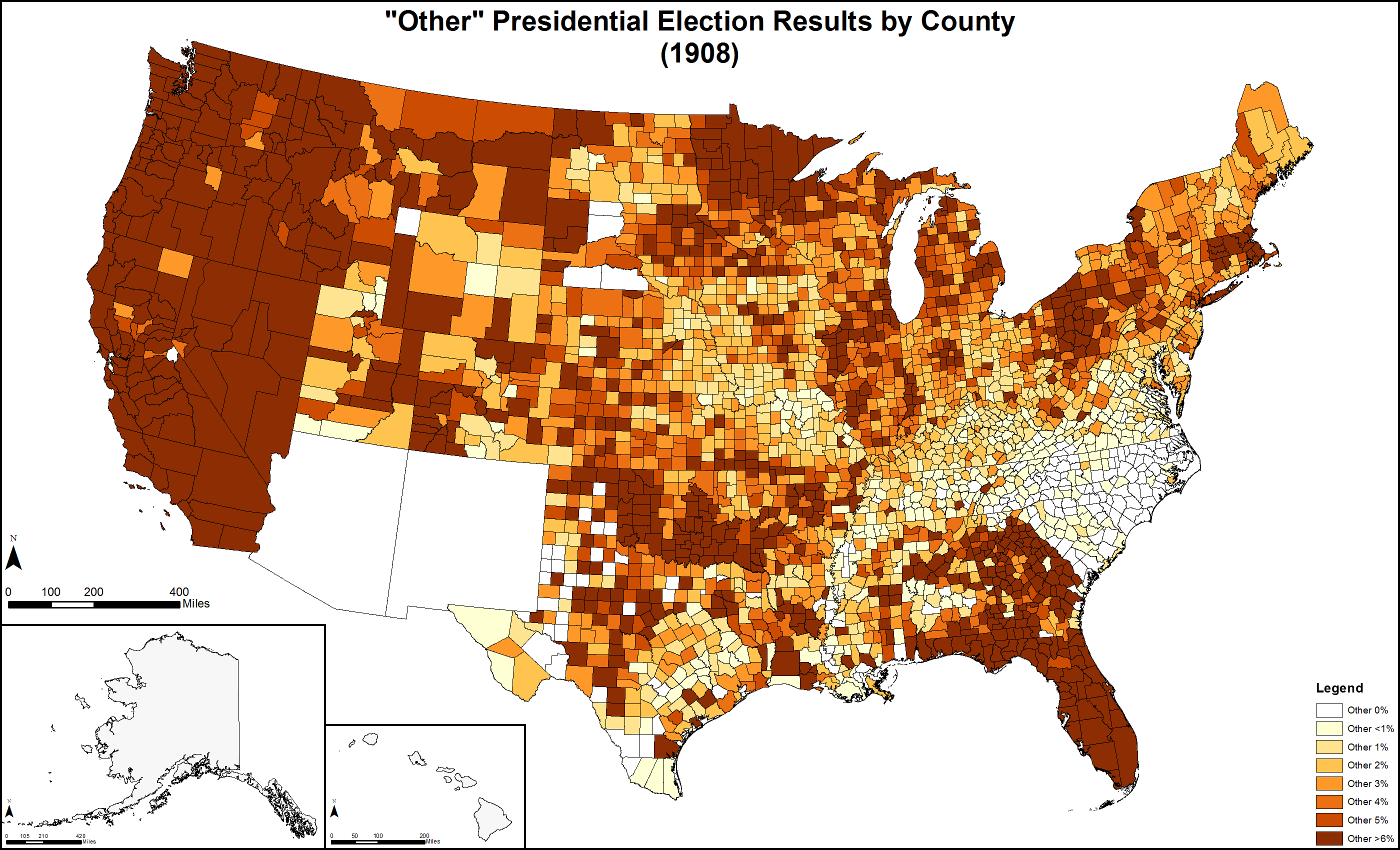
Map of "other" presidential election results by county

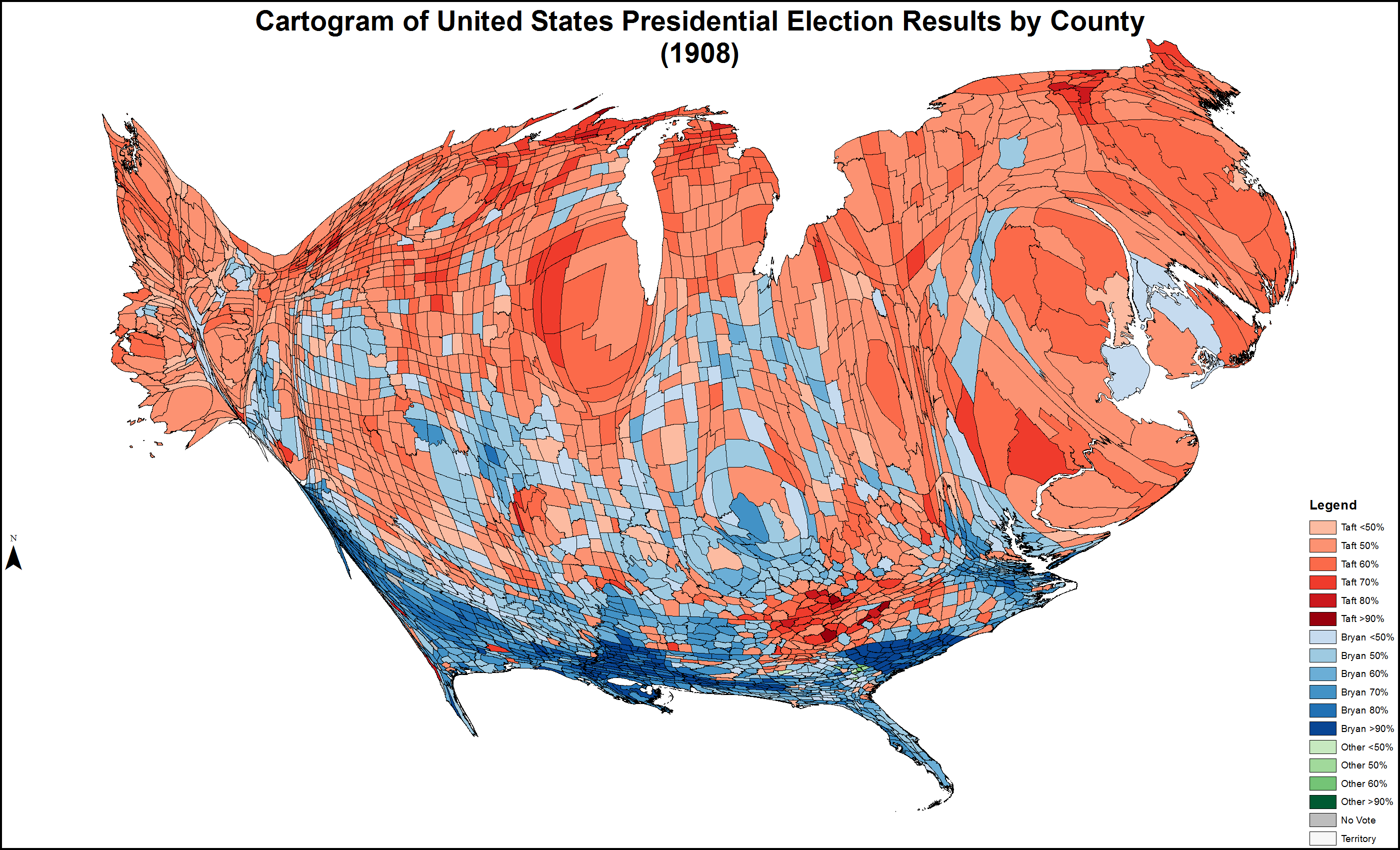
Cartogram of presidential election results by county

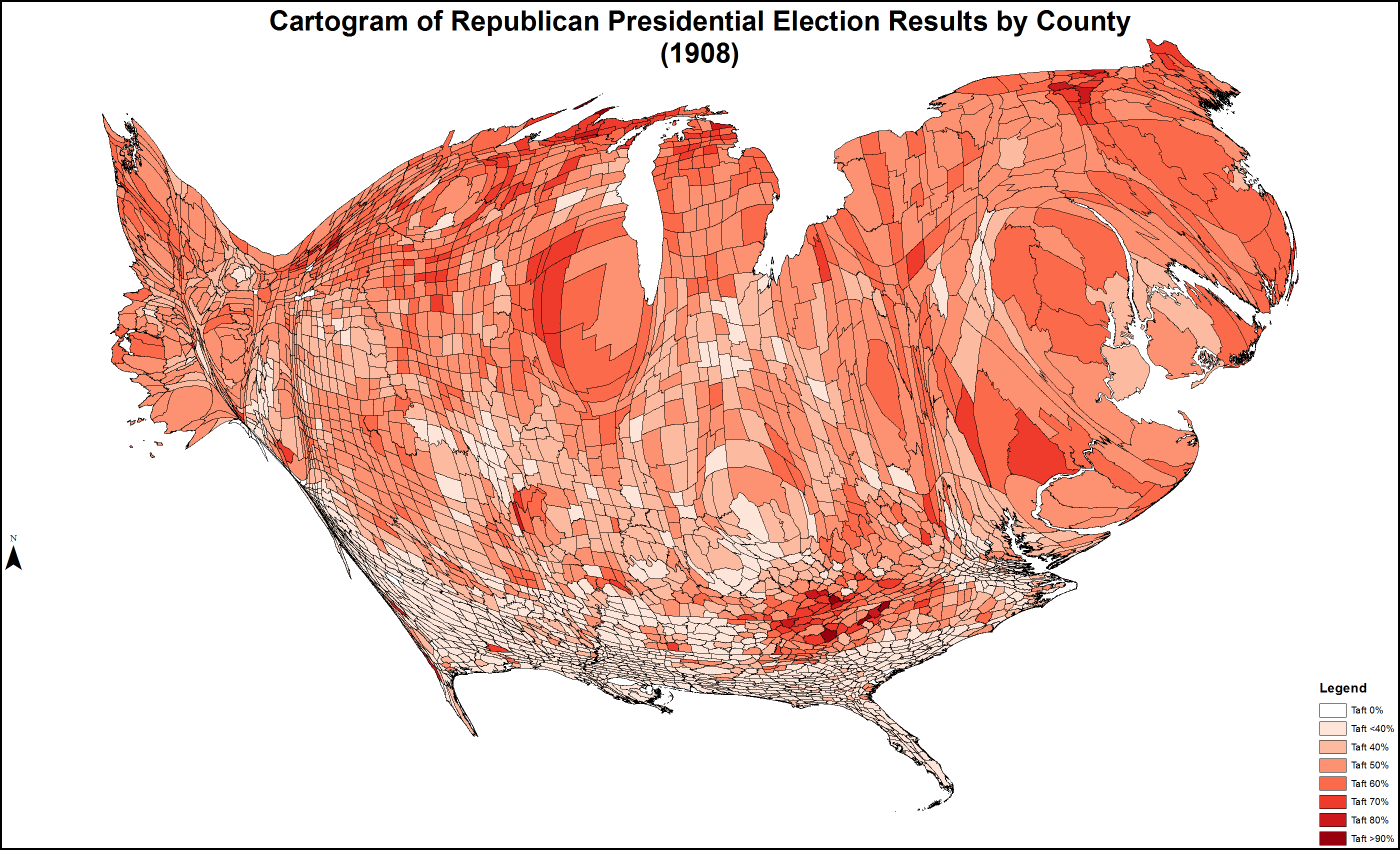
Cartogram of Republican presidential election results by county

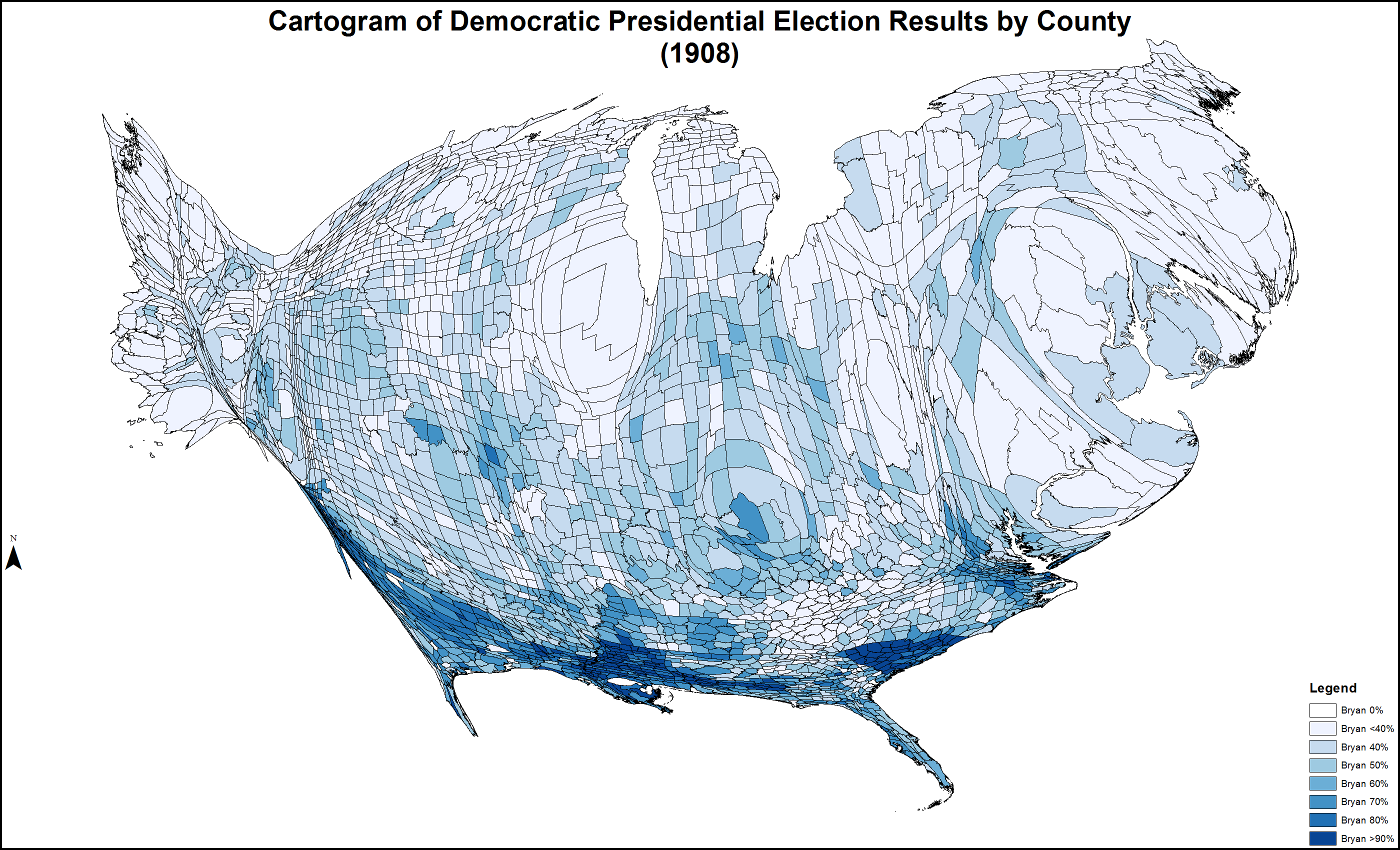
Cartogram of Democratic presidential election results by county

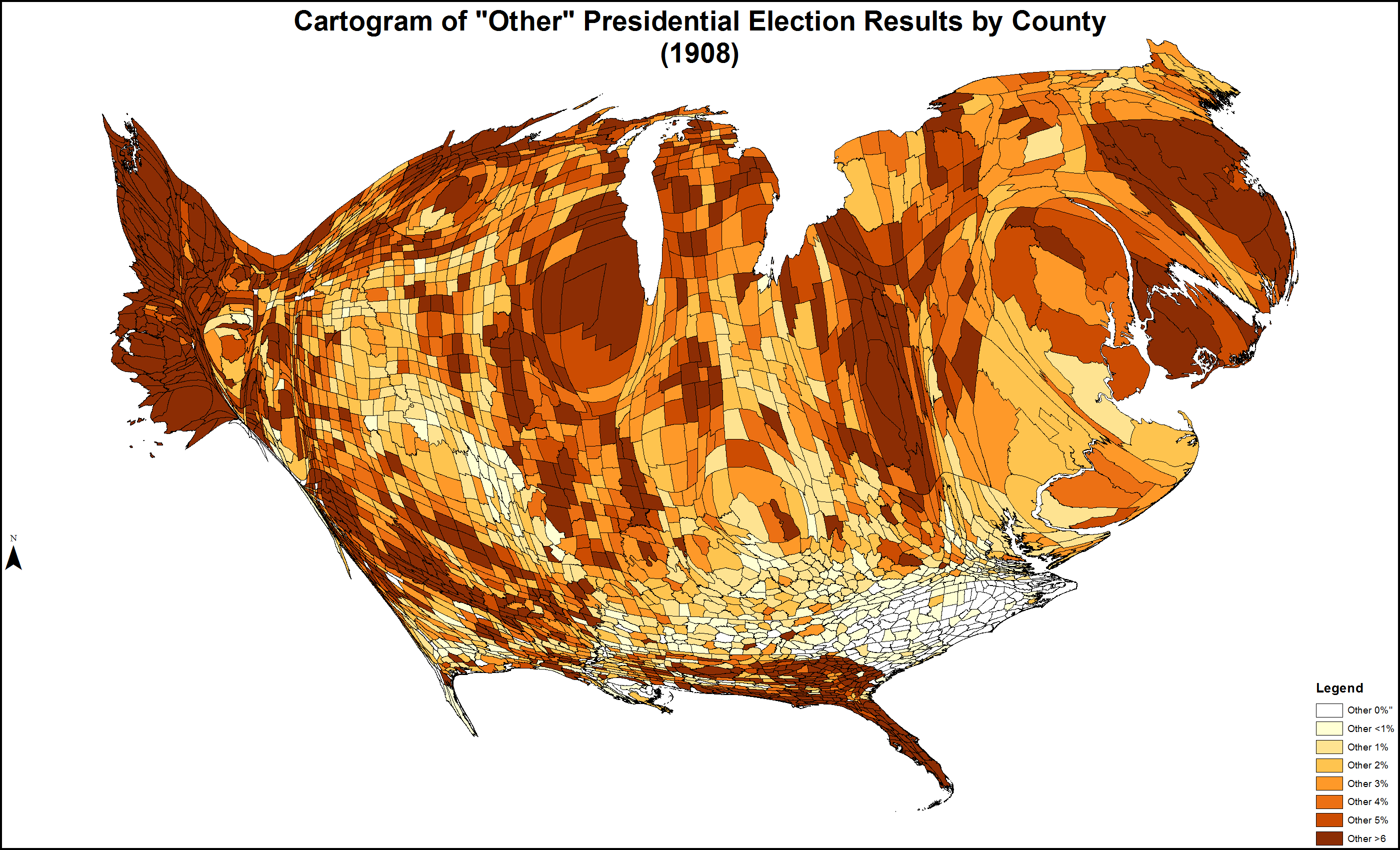
Cartogram of "other" presidential election results by county

State Level Performance for Eugene Debs' Presidential Campaign, 1908 (Socialist Party)

=== Results by state ===
States/districts won by Bryan/Kern
States/districts won by Taft/Sherman

		William Howard Taft Republican			William Jennings Bryan Democratic			Eugene V. Debs Socialist			Eugene Chafin Prohibition			Thomas Hisgen Independence			Thomas Watson People's			August Gillhaus Socialist Labor			Margin		State Total	
State	electoral votes	#	%	electoral votes	#	%	electoral votes	#	%	electoral votes	#	%	electoral votes	#	%	electoral votes	#	%	electoral votes	#	%	electoral votes	#	%	#	
Alabama	11	25,561	24.31	-	74,391	70.75	11	1,450	1.38	-	690	0.66	-	497	0.47	-	1,576	1.50	-	-	-	-	-48,830	-46.44	105,152	AL
Arkansas	9	56,624	37.30	-	87,015	57.31	9	5,842	3.85	-	1,026	0.68	-	289	0.19	-	1,026	0.68	-	-	-	-	-30,391	-20.02	151,822	AR
California	10	214,398	55.46	10	127,492	32.98	-	28,659	7.41	-	11,770	3.04	-	4,278	1.11	-	-	-	-	-	-	-	86,906	22.48	386,597	CA
Colorado	5	123,693	46.88	-	126,644	48.00	5	7,960	3.02	-	5,559	2.11	-	-	-	-	-	-	-	-	-	-	-2,951	-1.12	263,858	CO
Connecticut	7	112,915	59.43	7	68,255	35.92	-	5,113	2.69	-	2,380	1.25	-	728	0.38	-	-	-	-	608	0.32	-	44,660	23.50	190,003	CT
Delaware	3	25,014	52.10	3	22,055	45.94	-	239	0.50	-	670	1.40	-	29	0.06	-	-	-	-	-	-	-	2,959	6.16	48,007	DE
Florida	5	10,654	21.58	-	31,104	63.01	5	3,747	7.59	-	1,356	2.75	-	553	1.12	-	1,946	3.94	-	-	-	-	-20,450	-41.43	49,360	FL
Georgia	13	41,355	31.21	-	72,350	54.60	13	584	0.44	-	1,452	1.10	-	76	0.06	-	16,687	12.59	-	-	-	-	-30,995	-23.39	132,504	GA
Idaho	3	52,621	54.09	3	36,162	37.17	-	6,400	6.58	-	1,986	2.04	-	124	0.13	-	-	-	-	-	-	-	16,459	16.92	97,293	ID
Illinois	27	629,932	54.53	27	450,810	39.02	-	34,711	3.00	-	29,364	2.54	-	7,724	0.67	-	633	0.05	-	1,680	0.15	-	179,122	15.50	1,155,254	IL
Indiana	15	348,993	48.40	15	338,262	46.91	-	13,476	1.87	-	18,045	2.50	-	514	0.07	-	1,193	0.17	-	643	0.09	-	10,731	1.49	721,126	IN
Iowa	13	275,209	55.62	13	200,771	40.58	-	8,287	1.67	-	9,837	1.99	-	404	0.08	-	261	0.05	-	-	-	-	74,438	15.05	494,769	IA
Kansas	10	197,216	52.46	10	161,209	42.88	-	12,420	3.30	-	5,033	1.34	-	68	0.02	-	-	-	-	-	-	-	36,007	9.58	375,946	KS
Kentucky	13	235,711	48.03	-	244,092	49.74	13	4,093	0.83	-	5,885	1.20	-	200	0.04	-	333	0.07	-	405	0.08	-	-8,381	-1.71	490,719	KY
Louisiana	9	8,958	11.93	-	63,568	84.63	9	2,514	3.35	-	-	-	-	77	0.10	-	-	-	-	-	-	-	-54,610	-72.70	75,117	LA
Maine	6	66,987	63.00	6	35,403	33.29	-	1,758	1.65	-	1,487	1.40	-	700	0.66	-	1	0.00	-	-	-	-	31,584	29.70	106,336	ME
Maryland	8	116,513	48.85	2	115,908	48.59	6	2,323	0.97	-	3,302	1.38	-	485	0.20	-	-	-	-	-	-	-	605	0.25	238,531	MD
Massachusetts	16	265,966	58.21	16	155,543	34.04	-	10,779	2.36	-	4,374	0.96	-	19,237	4.21	-	-	-	-	1,011	0.22	-	110,423	24.17	456,919	MA
Michigan	14	335,580	61.93	14	175,771	32.44	-	11,586	2.14	-	16,974	3.13	-	760	0.14	-	-	-	-	1,096	0.20	-	159,809	29.49	541,830	MI
Minnesota	11	195,843	59.11	11	109,401	33.02	-	14,527	4.38	-	11,107	3.35	-	426	0.13	-	-	-	-	-	-	-	86,442	26.09	331,304	MN
Mississippi	10	4,363	6.52	-	60,287	90.11	10	978	1.46	-	-	-	-	-	-	-	1,276	1.91	-	-	-	-	-55,924	-83.59	66,904	MS
Missouri	18	347,203	48.50	18	346,574	48.41	-	15,431	2.16	-	4,284	0.60	-	402	0.06	-	1,165	0.16	-	868	0.12	-	629	0.09	715,927	MO
Montana	3	32,333	46.98	3	29,326	42.61	-	5,855	8.51	-	827	1.20	-	481	0.70	-	-	-	-	-	-	-	3,007	4.37	68,822	MT
Nebraska	8	126,997	47.60	-	131,099	49.14	8	3,524	1.32	-	5,179	1.94	-	-	-	-	-	-	-	-	-	-	-4,102	-1.54	266,799	NE
Nevada	3	10,775	43.93	-	11,212	45.71	3	2,103	8.57	-	-	-	-	436	1.78	-	-	-	-	-	-	-	-437	-1.78	24,526	NV
New Hampshire	4	53,149	59.32	4	33,655	37.56	-	1,299	1.45	-	905	1.01	-	584	0.65	-	-	-	-	-	-	-	19,494	21.76	89,600	NH
New Jersey	12	265,298	56.80	12	182,522	39.07	-	10,249	2.19	-	4,930	1.06	-	2,916	0.62	-	-	-	-	1,196	0.26	-	82,776	17.72	467,111	NJ
New York	39	870,070	53.11	39	667,468	40.74	-	38,451	2.35	-	22,667	1.38	-	35,817	2.19	-	-	-	-	3,877	0.24	-	202,602	12.37	1,638,350	NY
North Carolina	12	114,887	45.49	-	136,928	54.22	12	372	0.15	-	354	0.14	-	-	-	-	-	-	-	-	-	-	-22,041	-8.73	252,554	NC
North Dakota	4	57,680	61.02	4	32,885	34.79	-	2,421	2.56	-	1,496	1.58	-	43	0.05	-	-	-	-	-	-	-	24,795	26.23	94,525	ND
Ohio	23	572,312	51.03	23	502,721	44.82	-	33,795	3.01	-	11,402	1.02	-	439	0.04	-	162	0.01	-	721	0.06	-	69,591	6.20	1,121,552	OH
Oklahoma	7	110,550	43.03	-	123,907	48.22	7	21,752	8.47	-	-	-	-	274	0.11	-	412	0.17	-	-	-	-	-11,889	-4.66	256,917	OK
Oregon	4	62,530	56.39	4	38,049	34.31	-	7,339	6.62	-	2,682	2.42	-	289	0.26	-	-	-	-	274	0.11	-	24,481	22.08	110,889	OR
Pennsylvania	34	745,779	58.84	34	448,782	35.41	-	33,914	2.68	-	36,694	2.90	-	1,057	0.08	-	-	-	-	1,224	0.10	-	296,997	23.43	1,267,450	PA
Rhode Island	4	43,942	60.76	4	24,706	34.16	-	1,365	1.89	-	1,016	1.40	-	1,105	1.53	-	-	-	-	183	0.25	-	19,236	26.60	72,317	RI
South Carolina	9	3,945	5.94	-	62,288	93.84	9	100	0.15	-	-	-	-	46	0.07	-	-	-	-	-	-	-	-58,343	-87.89	66,379	SC
South Dakota	4	67,536	58.84	4	40,266	35.08	-	2,846	2.48	-	4,039	3.52	-	88	0.08	-	-	-	-	-	-	-	27,270	23.76	114,775	SD
Tennessee	12	117,977	45.87	-	135,608	52.73	12	1,870	0.73	-	301	0.12	-	332	0.13	-	1,092	0.42	-	-	-	-	-17,631	-6.86	257,180	TN
Texas	18	65,666	22.35	-	217,302	73.97	18	7,870	2.68	-	1,634	0.56	-	115	0.04	-	994	0.34	-	176	0.06	-	-151,636	-51.62	293,757	TX
Utah	3	61,028	56.19	3	42,601	39.22	-	4,895	4.51	-	-	-	-	87	0.08	-	-	-	-	-	-	-	18,427	16.97	108,613	UT
Vermont	4	39,552	75.08	4	11,496	21.82	-	-	-	-	799	1.52	-	804	1.53	-	-	-	-	-	-	-	28,056	53.26	52,680	VT
Virginia	12	52,572	38.36	-	82,946	60.52	12	255	0.19	-	1,111	0.81	-	51	0.04	-	105	0.08	-	25	0.02	-	-30,374	-22.16	137,065	VA
Washington	5	106,062	57.68	5	58,691	31.92	-	14,177	7.71	-	4,700	2.56	-	249	0.14	-	-	-	-	-	-	-	47,371	25.76	183,879	WA
West Virginia	7	137,869	53.42	7	111,418	43.17	-	3,679	1.43	-	5,139	1.99	-	-	-	-	-	-	-	-	-	-	26,451	10.25	258,105	WV
Wisconsin	13	247,747	54.52	13	166,662	36.67	-	28,147	6.19	-	11,565	2.54	-	-	-	-	-	-	-	318	0.07	-	81,085	17.84	454,441	WI
Wyoming	3	20,846	55.43	3	14,918	39.67	-	1,715	4.56	-	66	0.18	-	64	0.17	-	-	-	-	-	-	-	5,928	15.76	37,609	WY
TOTALS:	483	7,678,335	51.57	321	6,408,979	43.04	162	420,852	2.83	-	254,087	1.71	-	82,574	0.55	-	28,862	0.19	-	14,031	0.09	-	1,269,356	8.53	14,889,239	US

=== States that flipped from Republican to Democratic ===
- Colorado
- Nebraska
- Nevada

=== Close states ===
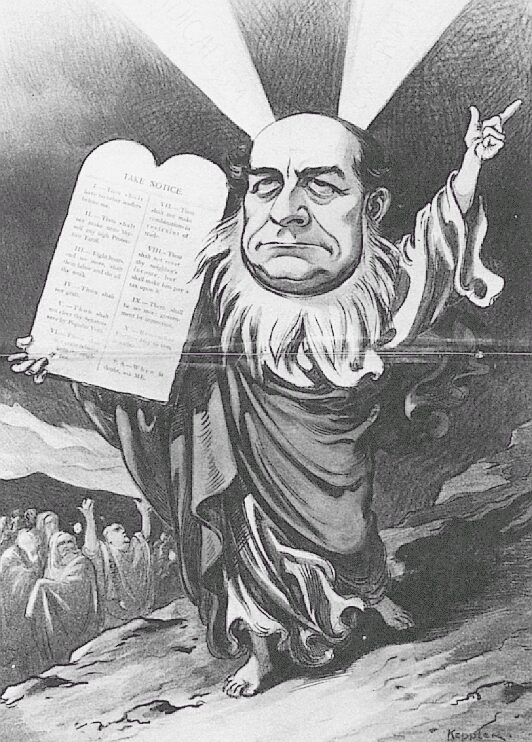
William J Bryan in 1906 as Moses with new 10 commandments; Puck 19 sept 1906 by Joseph Keppler. Tablet reads: l-Thou shalt have no other leaders before me. II—Thou shalt not make unto thyself any high Protective Tariff. Ill—Eight hours, and no more, shalt thou labor and do all thy work. IV—Thou shalt not graft. V—Thou shalt not elect thy Senators save by Popular Vote. VI—Thou shalt not grant rebates unto thy neighbor. VII—Thou shalt not make combinations in restraint of trade. VIII—Thou shalt not covet thy neighbor's income, but shall make him pay a tax upon it. IX—There shall be no more government by injunction. X—Remember Election Day to vote it early. P.S.— When in doubt, ask Me.

Margin of victory less than 1% (34 electoral votes):

1. Missouri, 0.09% (629 votes)
2. Maryland, 0.25% (605 votes)

Margin of victory less than 5% (46 electoral votes):

1. Colorado, 1.12% (2,951 votes)
2. Indiana, 1.49% (10,731 votes)
3. Nebraska, 1.54% (4,102 votes)
4. Kentucky, 1.71% (8,381 votes)
5. Nevada, 1.78% (437 votes)
6. Montana, 4.37% (3,007 votes)
7. Oklahoma, 4.66% (11,889 votes)

Margin of victory between 5% and 10% (60 electoral votes):

1. Delaware, 6.16% (2,959 votes)
2. Tennessee, 6.86% (17,631 votes)
3. Ohio, 6.20% (69,591 votes)
4. North Carolina, 8.73% (22,041 votes)
5. Kansas, 9.58% (36,007 votes)

Tipping point state:

1. West Virginia, 10.25% (26,451 votes)

==== Statistics ====
Counties with Highest Percent of Vote (Republican)

1. Leslie County, Kentucky 92.96%
2. Unicoi County, Tennessee 92.77%
3. Sevier County, Tennessee 91.44%
4. Keweenaw County, Michigan 90.56%
5. Johnson County, Tennessee 90.21%

Counties with Highest Percent of Vote (Democratic)

1. Hampton County, South Carolina 100.00%
2. King County, Texas 100.00%
3. Garza County, Texas 100.00%
4. Loving County, Texas 100.00%
5. Wilcox County, Alabama 99.81%

Counties with Highest Percent of Vote (Other)

1. Terry County, Texas 100.00%
2. Glascock County, Georgia 69.97%
3. McDuffie County, Georgia 64.31%
4. Lincoln County, Georgia 61.65%
5. Oconee County, Georgia 56.21%

== Campaign memorabilia ==
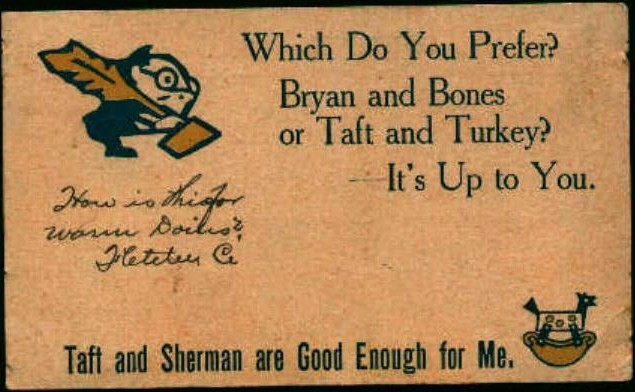
Taft-Sherman postcard

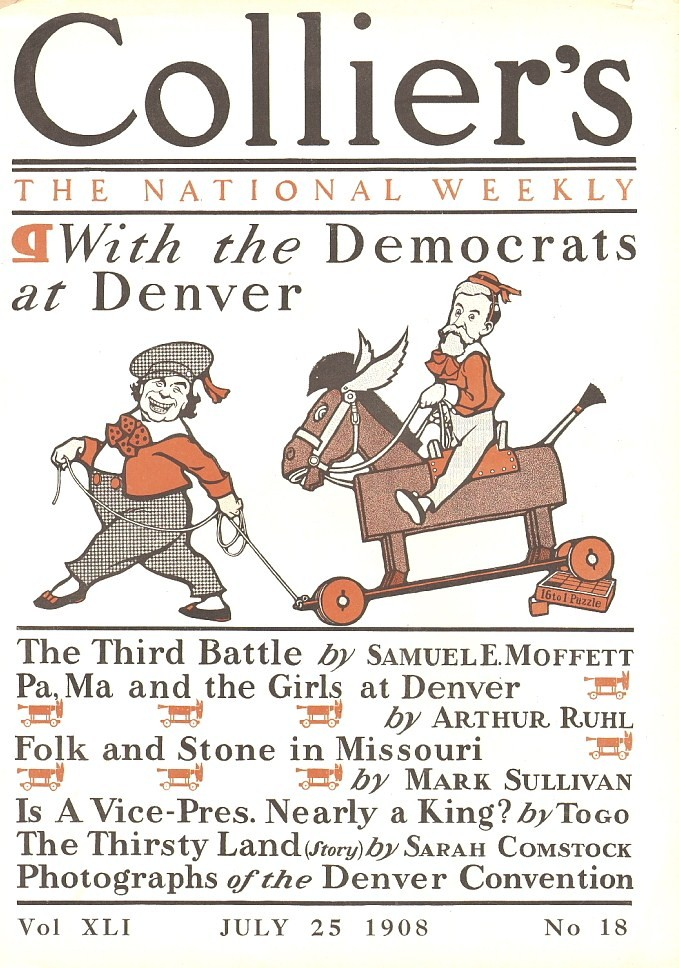
Collier's magazine cover

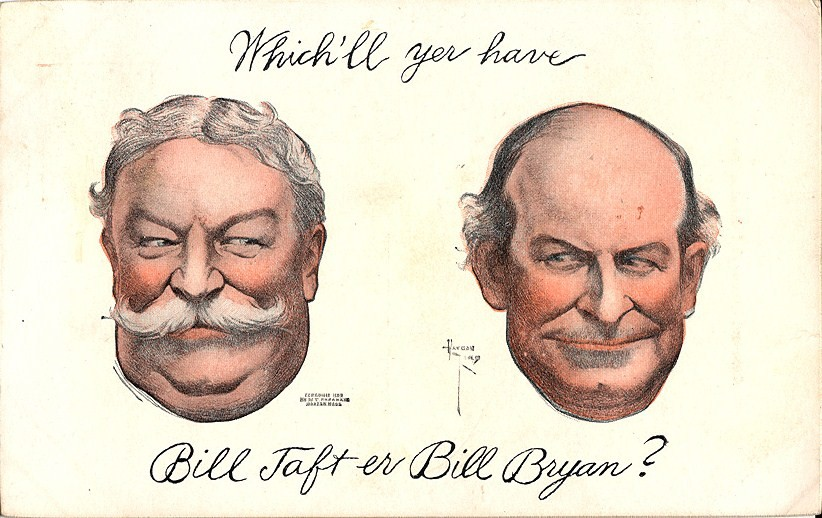
Humorous postcard

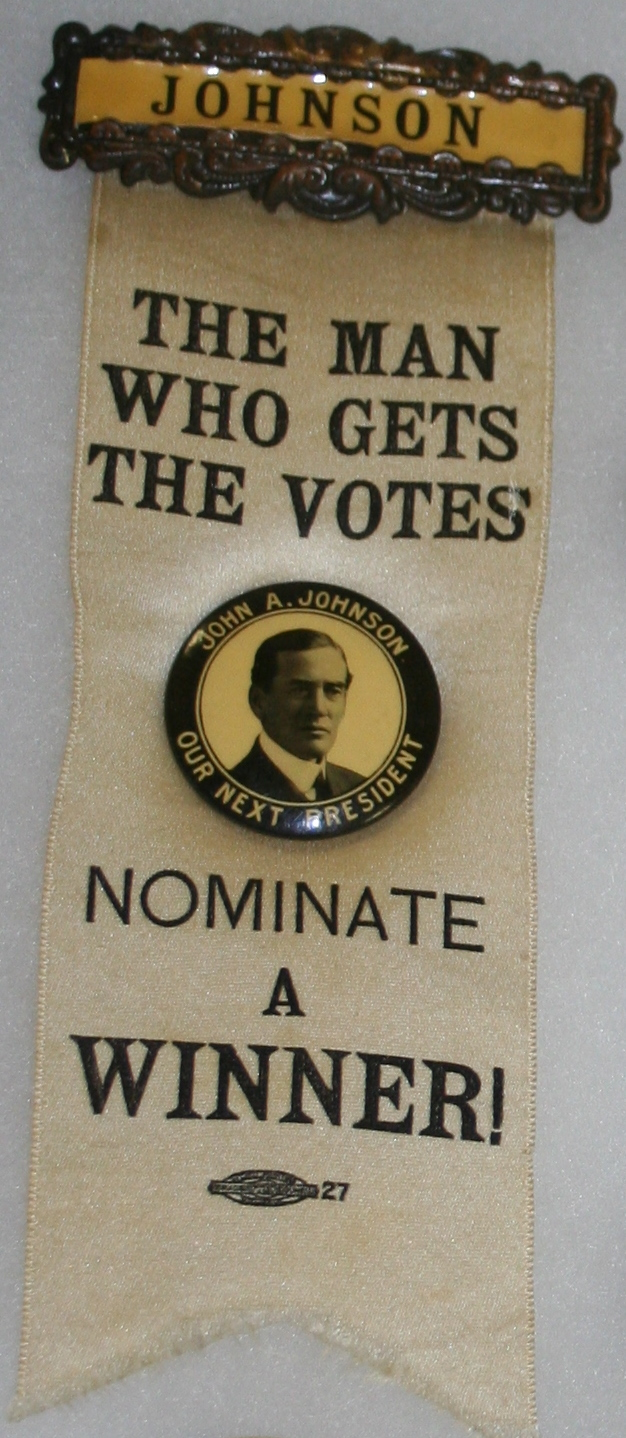
John Johnson ribbon

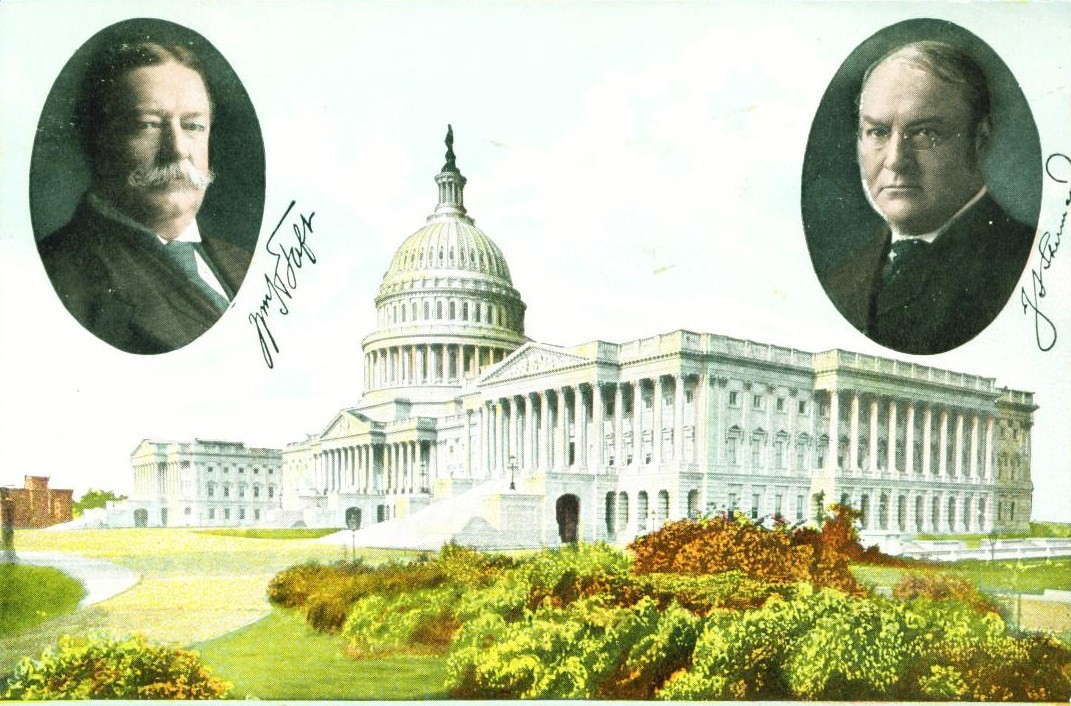
Taft-Sherman postcard with U.S. Capitol

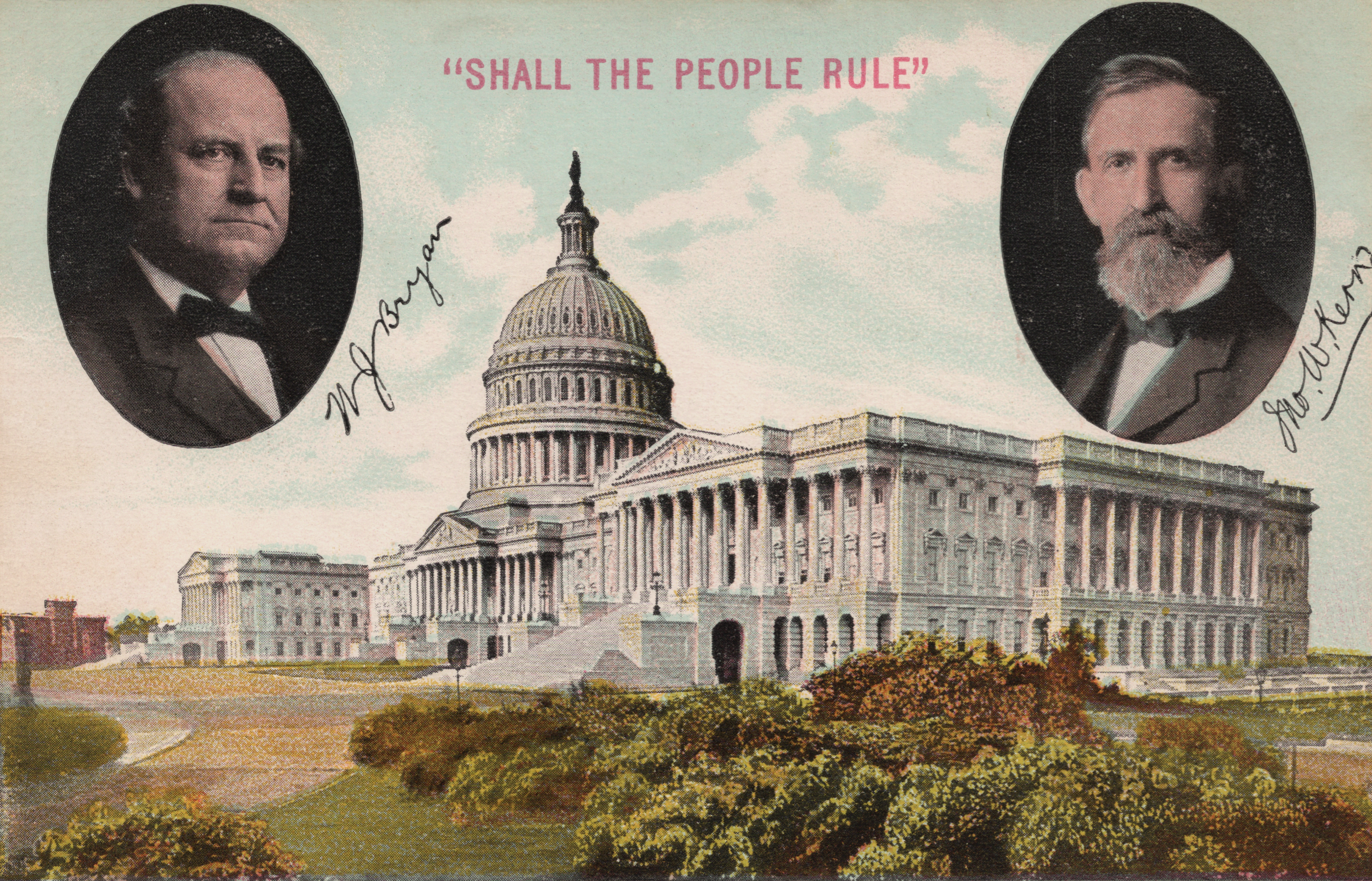
Bryan-Kern postcard with U.S. Capitol

== See also ==
- President of the United States
- History of the United States (1865–1918)
- 1908 United States House of Representatives elections
- 1908–1909 United States Senate elections
- Inauguration of William Howard Taft

== Works cited ==
- Abramson, Paul; Aldrich, John; Rohde, David (1995). Change and Continuity in the 1992 Elections. CQ Press. ISBN 0871878399.
- Sherman, Richard (1973). The Republican Party and Black America From McKinley to Hoover 1896-1933. University of Virginia Press. ISBN 0813904676.
