= William Jennings Bryan presidential campaign =

William Jennings Bryan unsuccessfully ran for president thrice:

- William Jennings Bryan presidential campaign, 1896
- William Jennings Bryan presidential campaign, 1900, the failed campaign William Jennings Bryan conducted in 1900
- William Jennings Bryan presidential campaign, 1908, the failed campaign William Jennings Bryan conducted in 1908
