= Samuel Williams (American politician) =

American politician (1851–1913)

Samuel Wardell Williams
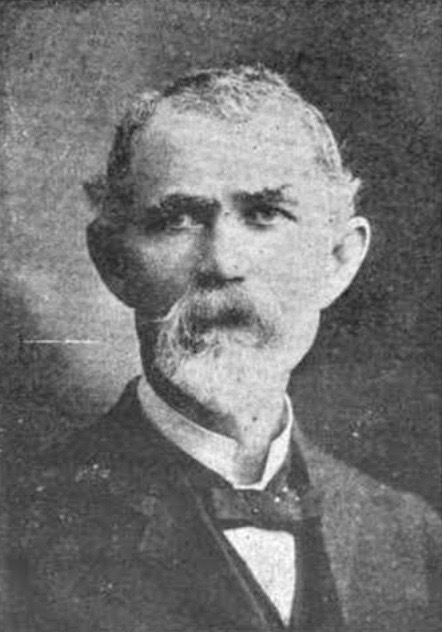

Majority Leader of the Indiana House of Representatives
- In office 1885

Member of the Indiana House of Representatives from Knox County
- In office 1882–1886

Personal details
- Born: February 7, 1851 Mount Carmel, Illinois, U.S.
- Died: August 5, 1913 (aged 62) Vincennes, Indiana, U.S.
- Resting place: Greenlawn Cemetery
- Party: Democrat; Populist

Samuel Wardell Williams (February 7, 1851 – August 5, 1913) was an American judge who is best known for being the Populist Party's nominee for Vice President of the United States in the election of 1908.

== Early life ==
Williams was born in Mount Carmel, Illinois in 1851. At some point, he moved to Indiana and became a judge.

== Political career ==
In 1904, he was one of the candidates for the Populist Party's nomination for president and served as chairman of the Populist Committee. He came in third place at the convention, receiving 45 votes on the first ballot. Thomas E. Watson received 698 votes, and William V. Allen received 319.

Williams served in the Indiana House of Representatives and was a Democrat at the time of his election to the Indiana General Assembly.

In 1908, Williams was the vice presidential nominee of the Populist Party, running with Thomas E. Watson. They received 28,862 votes (0.19%), performing best in Watson's home state of Georgia, where they received upwards of 12%.

== Death ==
Williams died of appendicitis on August 5, 1913, in Vincennes, Indiana, at the age of 62. He is buried at Greenlawn Cemetery in Vincennes.

Party political offices
Preceded by Thomas Tibbles	Populist Party vice presidential candidate 1908 (lost)	Succeeded by None
