= Donald L. Munro =

American politician

Donald L. Munro, candidate of the Socialist Labor Party for Vice-President of the United States in 1908.

Donald Lon Munro (July 14, 1857 – September 29, 1919) was an American politician from Pennsylvania. In 1908, Munro was the vice-presidential nominee of the Socialist Labor Party of America. He was the running mate of August Gillhaus of New York. The pair were on 15 state ballots and received 14,031 votes.

Prior to running for vice-president, Munro was the SLP nominee in Pennsylvania for Supreme Court Judge. He was from coal mining town of DuBois, Pennsylvania.
