= Goldfield, Nevada, labor troubles of 1906–1907 =

Series of strikes

The Goldfield, Nevada labor troubles of 1906–1907 were a series of strikes and a lockout which pitted gold miners and other laborers, represented by the Western Federation of Miners (WFM) and the Industrial Workers of the World (IWW), against mine owners and businessmen.

The troubles are significant because in Goldfield the IWW gained its greatest degree of power in a labor market, and came closest to its ideal of "the one big union."^{p.191–192} The power of the IWW was ended by the controversial occupation by federal troops in December 1907.

== Background ==
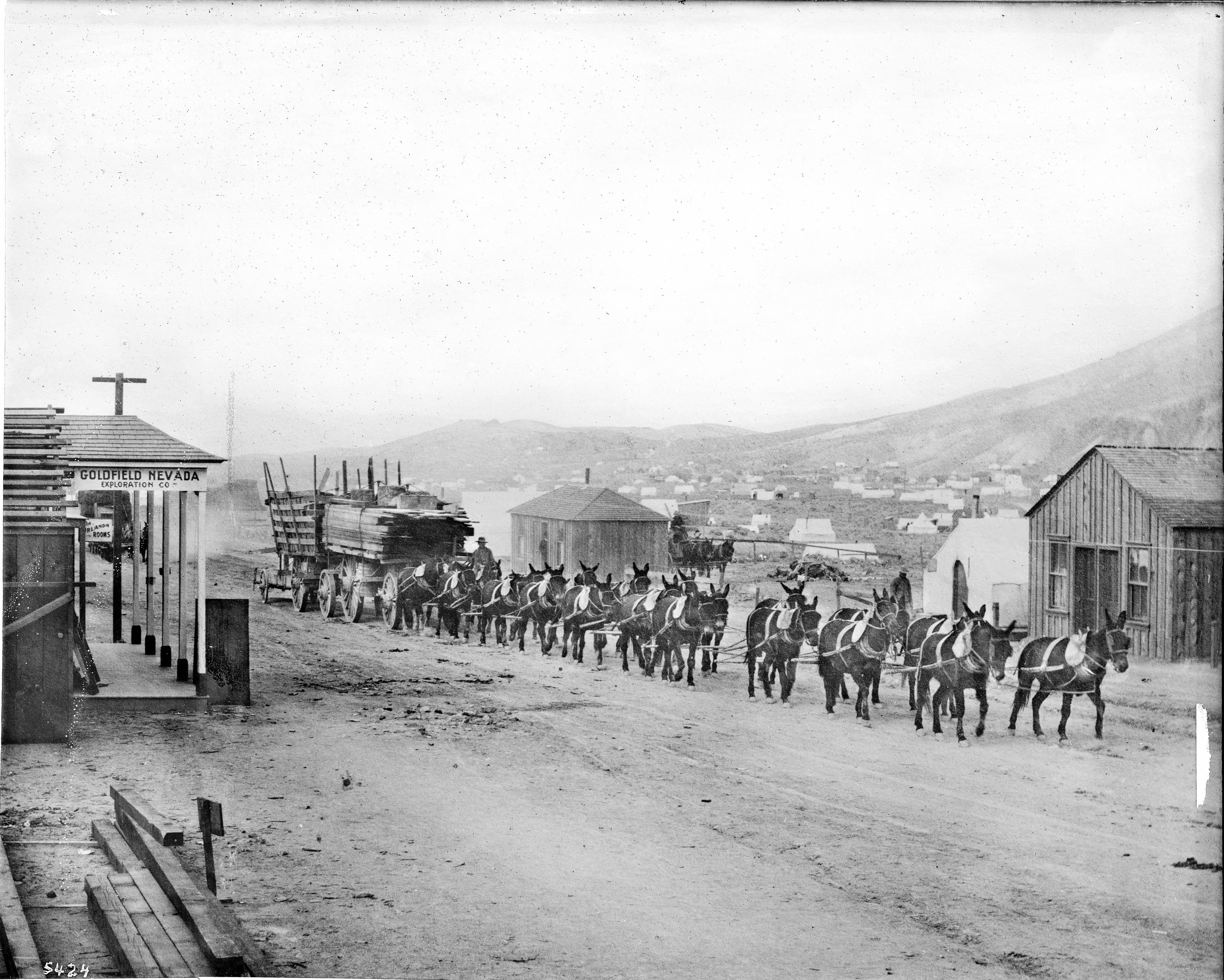
A burro-drawn wagon hauling lumber and supplies into Goldfield, Nevada, ca. 1904. In 1903 only 36 people lived in the new town. Goldfield reached a peak population of around 20,000 people in 1906, becoming Nevada's largest city.

Goldfield was organized as a town in October 1903 near recently discovered gold deposits in a remote spot of the southern Nevada desert.^{p.24} The population of the town rose to between 15,000 and 18,000 during the boom of 1904-1905, with another 2,000 in the suburbs. This briefly made Goldfield the most populous town in Nevada. Numerous new mining companies were established to mine at Goldfield, and shares found a ready market of investors. Demand for labor outstripped supply, giving labor unions the advantage.

=== Rise to power of the IWW ===
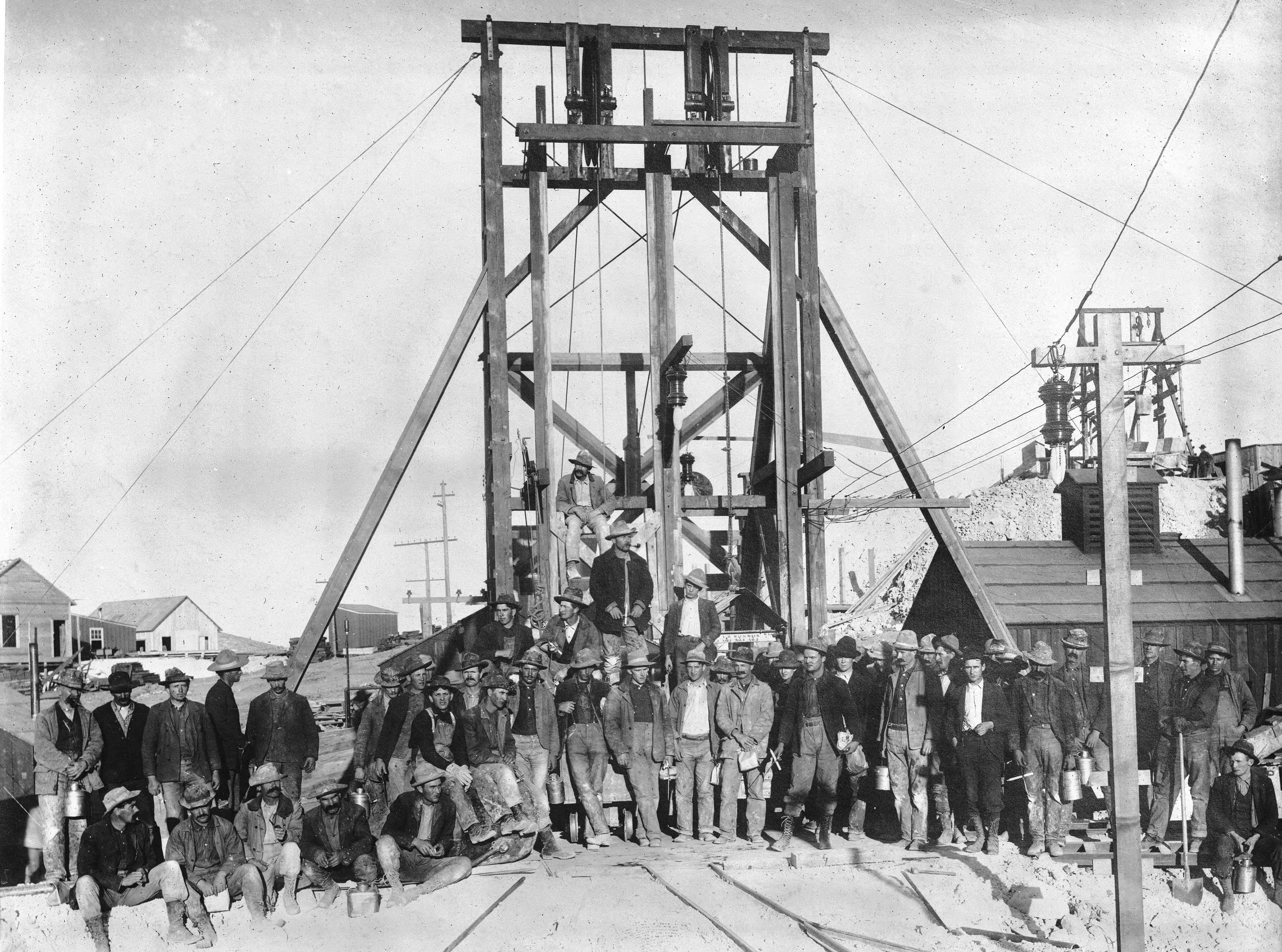
A group of miners (forming a mine shift) pose in front of mine headframe (shaft), Goldfield, Nevada, ca. 1905. In November, 1906, the Goldfield Consolidated Mines Company was incorporated by owners George Wingfield and United States Senator George Nixon, signaling the beginning of monopoly control in Goldfield, and the start of an adversarial relationship between mine owners and the unions.

Soon after mining on an extensive scale began at Goldfield, the miners organized themselves as a local branch of the Western Federation of Miners.

The Industrial Workers of the World was founded in 1905 in Chicago. Soon after, the Western Federation of Miners affiliated with the IWW, as its mining department. The description of the IWW as "one big union" summarized their negotiating tactics: a wrong done to any worker was seen as the concern of all workers, and was likely to be met with a general strike. The IWW also espoused radical socialism, and eschewed political action in favor of "direct action," with the goal of eliminating private ownership of businesses. One of the forms of direct action favored by the IWW was sabotage, which the union, officially at least, defined as working inefficiently or stupidly, so as to reduce profits of business owners, and thus hasten the end of capitalism. American Federation of Labor president Samuel Gompers observed that, as used by the IWW, "In actual practice it is hard to distinguish direct action, sabotage, and violence."

After the affiliation of the WFM with the IWW in 1905, the IWW organized nearly all the other workers in town, including bartenders, newsboys, and faro dealers. The numerous mining companies were under pressure from shareholders to show gold production without delay, which gave the unions further advantage. At the height of its power in Goldfield, the IWW did not even negotiate, but simply posted wage rates and required that employers comply. Local IWW leader Vincent St. John fondly recalled:

"The highest point of efficiency for any labor organization was reached by the I.W.W. and W.F.M. in Goldfield, Nevada. No committees were ever sent to any employers. The unions adopted wage scales and regulated hours. The secretary posted the same on a bulletin board outside of the union hall, and it was the LAW."^{p.201}

The mine owners were upset with the radicalism of the IWW, as well as with the high wages, and suggested that the WFM chapter (the mine workers) merge with the IWW chapter (the town workers), expecting that the more conservative miners would dampen the radicalism of the IWW. However, exactly the opposite happened, and the IWW radicals came to dominate the mine workers. The union declared strikes in December 1906 and January 1907 for higher wages. The mine owners capitulated both times.

IWW influence was at its peak on January 20, 1907, when all mines, restaurants, and saloons in Goldfield shut down on orders from the IWW, to increase attendance at the union's parade commemorating slain Russian revolutionaries, and to support Big Bill Haywood and two other WFM leasers, then under arrest in Idaho for conspiracy to murder ex-governor Steunenberg. That night, veteran WFM organizer Vincent St. John spoke to a packed audience in the union hall, promised revolution, and proclaimed: "We have no enemy but the capitalist class!"^{p.33-35,223-224}

Mine owner George Wingfield's spies in the IWW reported that Vincent St. John saw Nevada as an isolated state with a small population where he could achieve his dream of a syndicalist-socialist utopia. Starting with Goldfield as a nucleus, he thought that the IWW could organize the whole state, then shut down the state in a general strike, after which the IWW would simply step in and run things, in place of state and local governments.^{p.223}

A Chicago Record-Herald reporter wrote from Goldfield: "Socialism never had such a taste of the sweets of autocracy as it had in this southern Nevada mining camp, and it grew drunk with its power."

=== "The one big union" splits ===
Nationally, many WFM members were wary of the radicalism of the IWW, and did not want to give financial control to the IWW. The WFM delegates walked out of the 1906 IWW convention when the more radical faction - those opposed to political action - won control of the IWW. In 1907 the WFM, which made up about a third of the IWW membership, voted in a referendum to withdraw from the IWW.^{p.194} But for some time after the breakup, the WFM and IWW in Goldfield continued to work closely together. The leader of the WFM chapter in Goldfield was Vincent St. John, who shared the revolutionary ideals of the IWW. Some workers unwilling to join the IWW/WFM were forcibly ejected from the town by IWW members, sometimes accompanied by beatings.

In their quest for the "one big union," with revolutionary ideals, the IWW did not compromise with or accommodate other unions, and often fought rival unions as hard as they fought capitalism. Critics called this policy "rule or ruin." By 1907, the only two unions in Goldfield holding out against joining the IWW/WFM were two AFL-affiliated locals: the Carpenters Union, and the Typesetters' union at the Goldfield Sun.

=== Goldfield Sun ===
The IWW demanded that typesetters for the Goldfield Sun join the IWW. When they refused to do so, the IWW demanded that Lindley Branson, the owner and editor of the Sun, who also owned the Tonopah Sun, fire all non-IWW workers. But the Sun typesetters had been in the AFL Typesetters' Union for years, and the Sun had long recognized their union, and paid them union wages. The typesetters saw no reason to switch unions, and the Sun owner refused to fire them, and criticized the IWW in strong terms in his newspapers. In retaliation, the IWW, which was famous for its free speech fights, tried to shut down the Sun by orchestrating boycotts. The IWW ordered the town newsboys, all members of the IWW, to refuse to carry the Sun.^{p.192-193} The IWW pressured businesses to stop advertising in the Sun, threatening boycotts against any businesses that did not fall in line. Individual IWW members could be fined $15 for buying the Sun.

The IWW set down conditions for ending its boycotts of the Sun. Conditions included a published apology to the IWW, and a publication of a weekly column written by the IWW. Rather than surrender his editorial independence to the IWW, Branson sold the Goldfield Sun in August 1907, and moved 27 miles north to Tonopah, where his Tonopah Sun continued to criticize the IWW.^{p.166–167}

=== The death of Anton Silva ===
As part of their campaign against the AFL Carpenters' Union, the IWW threatened restaurants with union boycotts if they served meals to non-IWW carpenters. Most fell in line, but restaurateur Anton Silva continued to serve the AFL Carpenters, so the IWW declared a boycott against Silva, and began picketing his restaurant; business dropped drastically. When Silva confronted two pickets, W. R. Preston and Joseph Smith, in a threatening manner, Preston shot and killed Silva. Preston, a business agent of the IWW, pleaded self-defense, but a jury convicted him. The jury also convicted Smith, an officer of the union, for being an accomplice. The two received sentences of 25 years and 10 years.

The case became a rallying-point for both sides. The IWW insisted that Preston shot in self-defense, and that Smith was just a bystander, but that they were falsely convicted because of their union activism. The mine owners said that it was a premeditated plot to murder Silva, as an example to others.^{p.221}

== The lockout, March 1907 ==
In March 1907, the IWW ordered the AFL Carpenters to either join the IWW or leave town. The Carpenters did neither, but instead started carrying firearms to work. The IWW ordered the mine owners to stop employing members of the AFL Carpenters union. Instead, the mine owners banded together, and declared that they would hire no IWW members. To achieve this, the mine owners declared a lockout.

But once more, the mine owners gave in, and on 1 April 1907, signed an agreement to last two years, under which only members of the Goldfield Miners' Union (the local branch of the WFM) were allowed to work in and around the mines, excepting only managers and superintendents. The WFM and IWW had achieved their goals of bringing nearly all workers in Goldfield into the two unions.

=== Highgrading ===
Beginning in August 1907, a rule was introduced at some of the mines requiring miners to change their clothing before entering and after leaving the mines — a rule made necessary, according to the operators, by the wholesale stealing (in miners' parlance, "high-grading") of the very valuable ore (some of it valued at as high as $20 a pound).

== The miners strike, November 1907 ==
Miners had traditionally been paid in cash. In November 1907, following upon a nationwide financial panic, some of the owners adopted a system of paying wages half in gold, and half in cashier's checks drawn on the John T. Cook Bank in Goldfield. The miners insisted on being paid in legal tender or guaranteed checks. After several weeks of futile negotiations, the Goldfield Miners Union went out on strike on 27 November 1907.^{p.198}

=== Sending in federal troops ===
The mine owners did not want a repeat of their unsuccessful lockout of the previous March. The mine owners convinced Governor John Sparks that troops were needed to prevent violence. But the governor could not send in the state militia, because there was no state militia. Governor Sparks asked President Theodore Roosevelt to send federal troops into Goldfield, writing that violence at Goldfield included "unlawful dynamiting of property, commission of felonies, threats against the lives of law-abiding citizens, ..."^{p.196} But Roosevelt hesitated. Federal troops were by law a last resort, and there did not seem to be widespread disorder in the town. Also, he saw no political advantage in being embroiled in a labor dispute. Roosevelt was skeptical, but after several Nevada officials assured him that uncontrolled violence existed in Goldfield, Roosevelt sent Brigadier General Frederick Funston, commander of the Division of California, at San Francisco, to investigate. Funston told Roosevelt that although violence was not prevalent at the time, that at least 300 of the 1,000 striking miners were radicals prone to violence. Funston recommended that Army troops be sent to Goldfield to maintain order.^{p.195–196}

Roosevelt followed Funston's advice, and US Army troops arrived from San Francisco on 7 December 1907. The mine owners immediately requested that the troops be assigned to guard the mines, but Colonel Reynolds, the commander of the Army troops, refused. He had been directed by his superiors to take orders only from Washington, not those of state or local officials, or mine owners. Reynolds been sent to put down an insurrection, and had arrived to find a peaceful situation. As far as he was concerned, he and his men had no reason to be there, although this was not the opinion of his superior, General Funston.^{p.196–197}

Mindful of the controversial actions of federal troops in the mining labor disputes at Coeur d'Alene, Idaho in 1892 and 1899, Roosevelt repeatedly urged the Army to act with restraint. The president admonished Funston by telegram:

"The troops are not sent to take either side in a purely industrial dispute, as long as it is kept within the bounds of law and order. They are to be neither for nor against the strikers or the employers."^{p.199}

=== Mine owners reduce wages ===
The day after troops arrived, the mine owners reduced wages, and announced that the mines would reopen 12 December, with imported nonunion labor if needed. Conditions remained peaceful, but once the mines brought in nonunion men, violence became highly probable if the troops were to be withdrawn. Colonel Reynolds saw that the mine owners had planned the pay cut, but had needed the presence of his troops to impose it without suffering violence and disorder.

Torn between the report of Col. Reynolds that Goldfield was peaceful, and messages from General Funston and state officials that the situation was too dangerous to withdraw troops, Roosevelt appointed a special commission to investigate and report back. Roosevelt's commission noted the radical views of the miners' union leadership, and advised Roosevelt that following the pay cuts announced by the mine owners, withdrawal of troops would result in violence.

Roosevelt concluded that although conditions had not warranted Sparks's appeal for assistance, that the immediate withdrawal of the troops might lead to serious disorder. So he consented that troops should remain for a short time, but on condition that the state should immediately organize an adequate militia or police force. Accordingly, a special meeting of the legislature was immediately called, the Nevada State Police was organized, and on March 7, 1908, the last federal troops were withdrawn. Thereafter, work was gradually resumed in the mines, the contest having been won by the mine owners.

The labor struggle coincided with a national economic downturn, and consequent loss of investment, and jobs, in Nevada mining companies. It also took place while the national WFM was withdrawing from affiliation with the IWW. The split between the two nationally made it more difficult to present a united front against the mine owners. Former WFM official Vincent St. John, who went with the IWW, complained that the "fight was compromised by the treachery of the W.F.M. general officers."^{p.194}

== Aftermath ==
The intense mining activity at Goldfield was sustained in part by promotional stock investments. When Goldfield mining shares lost favor with investors, the bubble burst. By 1908, the population had shrunk to 5,400, and by 1910, it was only 1,600.^{p.232–233}
