= August Gillhaus =

American engineer and political candidate

- Flyer for Gillhaus' 1908 presidential candidacy
- Born: June 10, 1867
- Died: May 4, 1932 (aged 64)
- Spouse: Marie
- Children: 2

August Gillhaus (June 10, 1867 - May 4, 1932) was an American engineer from The Bronx who was the Socialist Labor candidate for U.S. President in 1908 and for U.S. Vice President in 1912 and 1920.

== Career ==
In 1902, Gillhaus was among the delegates elected from New York City to the state Socialist Labor convention in Utica. In August 1905, he was elected general treasurer of the Socialist Trade and Labor Alliance of the United States and Canada, and a delegate to the forthcoming convention in Chicago which would give rise to the Industrial Workers of the World (IWW or "Wobblies").

Gillhaus was an active participant in what would come to be known as the first convention of the IWW, voted for the STLA to affiliate with the new organization, and was installed as a member thereof.

=== Political races ===
In the November 1905 New York City election, Gillhaus was the Socialist Labor nominee for Comptroller. In 1908, Gillhaus was substituted for the original Socialist Labor nominee, Morris R. "Morrie" Preston, a miner who was arrested on murder charges during a citywide strike in Goldfield, Nevada, in 1907. Gillhaus and his running mate Donald L. Munro, of Virginia, received 14,029 votes.

In 1912, as the VP candidate on the ticket with Arthur E. Reimer, Gillhaus got 29,213 votes. In 1914, he ran for New York State Engineer and Surveyor. In 1916, he ran for U.S. Senator from New York. In 1918 he ran for Lieutenant Governor of New York. In 1920, he was the Socialist Labor Party VP candidate on the ticket with William Wesley Cox. In 1930, he ran for New York State Attorney General.

== Death ==
Gillhaus died suddenly May 4, 1932, survived by his wife Marie, his mother Mary, six siblings and two children.
