= Springsnail =

Springsnail may refer to:

- Alamosa springsnail
- Brown springsnail
- Bruneau hot springsnail
- Chupadera springsnail
- Crystal Spring springsnail
- Davis County springsnail
- Diamond Y springsnail
- Distal-gland springsnail
- Elongate-gland springsnail
- Fairbanks springsnail
- Gila springsnail
- Grand Wash springsnail
- Huachuca springsnail
- Idaho springsnail
- Jackson lake springsnail
- Median-gland Nevada springsnail
- Montezuma Well springsnail
- Naegele springsnail
- Oasis Valley springsnail
- Page springsnail
- Roswell springsnail
- San Bernardino springsnail
- Socorro springsnail
- South Sierra Nevada springsnail
- Three forks springsnail
- Verde Rim springsnail
