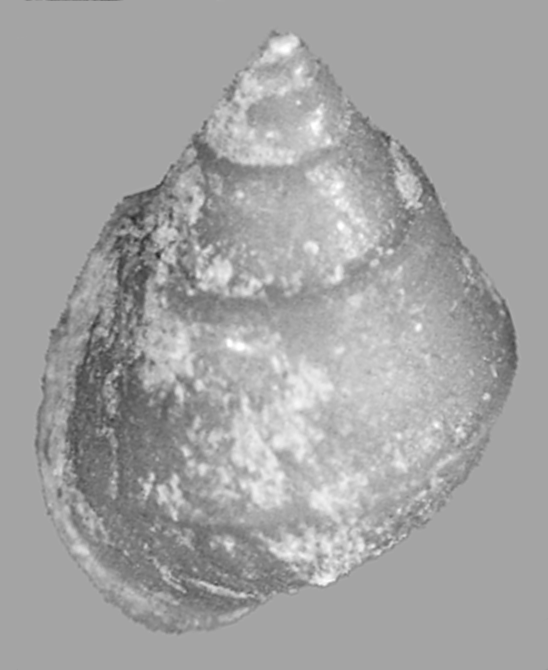
- Lateral view of a shell of Nymphophilus minckleyi

Scientific classification
- Kingdom: Animalia
- Phylum: Mollusca
- Class: Gastropoda
- Subclass: Caenogastropoda
- Order: Littorinimorpha
- Family: Hydrobiidae
- Genus: Pyrgulopsis
- Species: P. minkleyi

Binomial name
- Pyrgulopsis minkleyi (D. W. Taylor, 1966)

Synonyms
- Nymphophilus minckleyi D. W. Taylor, 1966

= Pyrgulopsis minkleyi =

Species of gastropod

Nymphophilus minckleyi is a species of very small freshwater snail, an aquatic gastropod mollusk in the family Hydrobiidae.

== Distribution ==
This species is endemic to Cuatro Ciénegas valley, in the Chihuahuan Desert, Mexico.

== Ecology ==
Predators of Mexithauma quadripaludium include the cichlid fish Herichthys minckleyi.
