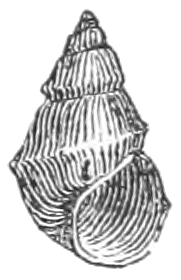
- Apertural view of a shell of †Pyrgulopsis nevadensis.

Scientific classification
- Kingdom: Animalia
- Phylum: Mollusca
- Class: Gastropoda
- Subclass: Caenogastropoda
- Order: Littorinimorpha
- Family: Hydrobiidae
- Subfamily: Nymphophilinae
- Genus: Pyrgulopsis; Call & Pilsbry, 1886

Diversity
- 133 species

= Pyrgulopsis =

Genus of gastropods

Pyrgulopsis is a genus of freshwater snails with a gill and an operculum, aquatic gastropod mollusks in the family Hydrobiidae.

== Etymology ==
The name Pyrgulopsis is composed from Pyrgula, another genus of snail, and opsis = aspect of.

== Description ==
Generic characters of the genus Pyrgulopsis are: the shell is minute, conically turreted, somewhat elongated, imperforate and unicarinate. The apex is acute. The aperture is ovate. The edge of the aperture, called the peritreme, is continuous. The operculum is ovate, thin, corneous and spiral, with polar point well forward and approximating the columella.

The jaw is thin and membranaceous. The radula is odontophore, with teeth are arranged in transverse rows, according to the formula 3 + 1 + 3. Formula for denticles of rhachidian: (4 + 1 + 4)/(1 + 1).

== Distribution ==
The distribution of the genus Pyrgulopsis includes Western and South-western United States. Snails of species in the genus Pyrgulopsis occur in fresh water and in brackish water.

== Species ==
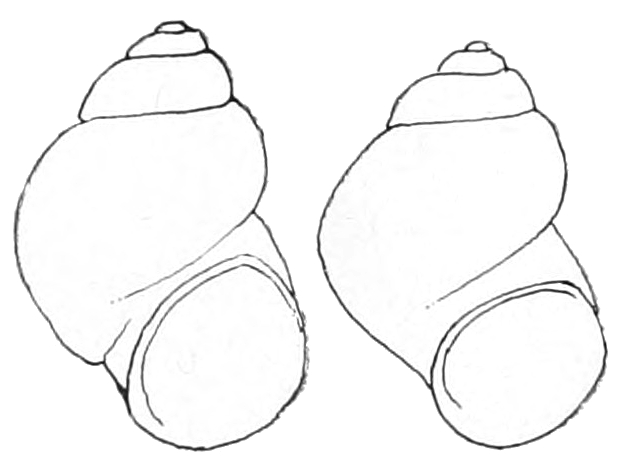
Shells of Pyrgulopsis deserta.

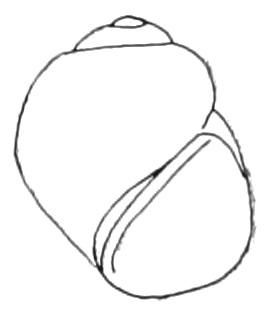
A shell of Pyrgulopsis neomexicana.

Pyrgulopsis is the largest genus of freshwater gastropods in the North America. In 2014, 139 species were recognized in this genus.

Species in the genus Pyrgulopsis include:

- Pyrgulopsis aardahli Hershler, 1989 - Benton Valley springsnail
- Pyrgulopsis aloba Hershler, 1999 - Duckwater pyrg
- Pyrgulopsis amargosae Hershler, 1989 - Amargosa springsnail
- Pyrgulopsis anguina Hershler, 1989 - Longitudinal gland pyrg
- Pyrgulopsis archimedis S. S. Berry, 1947 - archimedes pyrg
- Pyrgulopsis arizonae (Taylor, 1987) - Apache springsnail
- Pyrgulopsis avernalis (Pilsbry, 1935) - Moapa pebblesnail
- Pyrgulopsis bacchus Hershler, 1988 - Grand Wash springsnail
- Pyrgulopsis bedfordensis Hershler & Gustafson, 2001
- Pyrgulopsis bernardina (Taylor, 1987) - San Bernardino springsnail
- Pyrgulopsis blainica Hershler, Liu & Gustafson, 2008
- Pyrgulopsis bruneauensis Hershler, 1990 - Bruneau hot springsnail
- Pyrgulopsis bryantwalkeri Hershler, 1994 - Cortez Hills pebblesnail
- Pyrgulopsis californiensis (Gregg & Taylor, 1965) - Laguna Mountain springsnail
- Pyrgulopsis carinifera (Pilsbry, 1935)
- Pyrgulopsis castaicensis Hershler & Liu, 2010
- Pyrgulopsis chamberlini (Hershler, 1998) - smooth Glenwood pyrg
- Pyrgulopsis chupaderae (Taylor, 1987) - Chupadera springsnail
- Pyrgulopsis coloradensis Hershler, 1998 - Blue Point pyrg
- Pyrgulopsis conica Hershler, 1988 - Kingman springsnail
- Pyrgulopsis cruciglans Hershler, 1998 - Transverse grand pyrg
- Pyrgulopsis crystalis Hershler & Sada, 1987 - Crystal springsnail
- Pyrgulopsis davisi (Taylor, 1987) - Limpia Creek springsnail
- Pyrgulopsis deaconi Hershler, 1998 - Spring Mountains Pyrg
- Pyrgulopsis deserta (Pilsbry, 1916) - desert springsnail
- Pyrgulopsis diablensis Hershler, 1995 - Diablo Range pyrg
- Pyrgulopsis eremica Hershler, 1995 - Smoke Creek pyrg
- Pyrgulopsis erythropoma (Pilsbry, 1899) - Ash Meadows pebblesnail
- Pyrgulopsis fairbanksensis Hershler & Sada, 1987 - Fairbanks springsnail
- Pyrgulopsis fusca (Hershler, 1998) - Otter Creek pyrg
- Pyrgulopsis gibba Hershler, 1995 - Surprise Valley pyrg
- Pyrgulopsis gilae (Taylor, 1987) - Gila springsnail
- Pyrgulopsis giuliani Hershler & Pratt, 1990 - southern Sierra Nevada springsnail
- Pyrgulopsis glandulosa Hershler, 1988 - Verde Rim springsnail
- Pyrgulopsis greggi Hershler, 1995 - Kern River pyrg
- Pyrgulopsis hamlinensis Hershler, 1998 - Hamlin Valley pyrg
- Pyrgulopsis hendersoni (Pilsbry, 1933) - Harney Lake springsnail
- Pyrgulopsis idahoensis (Pilsbry, 1933) - Idaho springsnail
- Pyrgulopsis ignota Hershler, Liu & Lang, 2010
- Pyrgulopsis intermedia (Tryon, 1865) - Crooked Creek springsnail
- Pyrgulopsis isolata Hershler & Sada, 1987 - elongate-gland springsnail
- Pyrgulopsis kolobensis (Taylor, 1987) - Toquerville springsnail
- Pyrgulopsis licina Hershler, Liu & Bradford, 2013
- Pyrgulopsis longae Hershler, 1995 - Long Valley pyrg
- Pyrgulopsis longinqua (Gould, 1855)
- Pyrgulopsis marilynae (Hershler, Ratcliffe, Liu, Lang and Hay, 2014)
- Pyrgulopsis merriami (Pilsbry & Beecher, 1892) - Pahranagat pebblesnail
- Pyrgulopsis metcalfi (Taylor, 1987) - Naegele springsnail
- Pyrgulopsis micrococcus (Pilsbry, 1893) - Oasis Valley springsnail
- Pyrgulopsis milleri Hershler & Liu, 2010
- Pyrgulopsis minkleyi (D. W. Taylor, 1966)
- Pyrgulopsis montezumensis Hershler, 1988 - Montezuma Well springsnail
- Pyrgulopsis morrisoni Hershler, 1988 - Page springsnail
- Pyrgulopsis nanus Hershler & Sada, 1987 - distal-gland springsnail
- Pyrgulopsis neomexicana (Pilsbry, 1916) - Socorro springsnail
- Pyrgulopsis nevadensis (Stearns, 1883) - corded pyrg - type species
- Pyrgulopsis nonaria (Hershler, 1998) - Ninemile pyrg
- Pyrgulopsis owensensis Hershler, 1989 - Owens Valley springsnail
- Pyrgulopsis pecosensis (Taylor, 1987) - Pecos springsnail
- Pyrgulopsis perforata Hershler, Liu & Bradford, 2013
- Pyrgulopsis perturbata Hershler, 1989 - Fish Slough springsnail
- Pyrgulopsis pilsbryana (J. L. Baily & R. I. Baily, 1952) - Bear Lake springsnail
- Pyrgulopsis pisteri Hershler & Sada, 1987 - Median-gland Nevada springsnail
- Pyrgulopsis robusta (Walker, 1908) - Jackson Lake springsnail
- Pyrgulopsis roswellensis (Taylor, 1987) - Roswell springsnail
- Pyrgulopsis sanchezi Hershler, Liu & Bradford, 2013
- Pyrgulopsis saxatilis (Hershler, 1998) - sub-globose snake pyrg
- Pyrgulopsis similis (Hershler, Ratcliffe, Liu, Lang and Hay, 2014)
- Pyrgulopsis simplex Hershler, 1988 - Fossil springsnail
- Pyrgulopsis sola Hershler, 1988 - brown springsnail
- Pyrgulopsis stearnsiana (Pilsbry, 1899) - Yaqui springsnail
- Pyrgulopsis taylori Hershler, 1995 - San Luis Obispo pyrg
- Pyrgulopsis texana (Pilsbry, 1935) - Phantom cave snail
- Pyrgulopsis thermalis (Taylor, 1987) - New Mexico hot springsnail
- Pyrgulopsis thompsoni Hershler, 1988 - Huachuca springsnail
- Pyrgulopsis transversa (Hershler, 1998) - southern Bonneville pyrg
- Pyrgulopsis trivialis (Taylor, 1987) - Three Forks springsnail
- Pyrgulopsis turbatrix Hershler, 1998 - Southeast Nevada Pyrg
- Pyrgulopsis variegata () - Northwest Bonneville pyrg
- Pyrgulopsis ventricosa Hershler, 1995 - Clear Lake pyrg
- Pyrgulopsis wongi Hershler, 1989

Eastern North American species of Pyrgulopsis are considered to be in separate genus Marstonia according to the Thompson and Hershler (2002).

- Pyrgulopsis agarhecta (F. G. Thompson, 1969) - Ocmulgee marstonia - Marstonia agarhecta F.G. Thompson, 1969
- Pyrgulopsis arga - ghost marstonia - Marstonia arga F.G. Thompson, 1977
- Pyrgulopsis castor (F. G. Thompson, 1977) - beaverpond marstonia - Marstonia castor F.G. Thompson, 1977
- Pyrgulopsis halcyon (F. G. Thompson, 1977) - halcyon marstonia - Marstonia halcyon F.G. Thompson, 1977
- Pyrgulopsis hershleri F. G. Thompson, 1995 - Coosa pyrg - Marstonia hershleri (F.G. Thompson, 1995)
- Pyrgulopsis letsoni (Walker, 1901) - gravel pyrg - Marstonia letsoni (Walker, 1901)
- Pyrgulopsis lustrica (Pilsbry, 1890) - boreal marstonia - Marstonia lustrica (Pilsbry, 1890)
- Pyrgulopsis ogmoraphe (F. G. Thompson, 1977) - royal springsnail - Marstonia ogmorhaphe (F.G. Thompson, 1977)
- Pyrgulopsis olivacea (Pilsbry, 1895) - olive marstonia - Marstonia olivacea (Pilsbry, 1895)
- Pyrgulopsis ozarkensis Hinkley, 1915 - Ozark pyrg - Marstonia ozarkensis (Hinkley, 1915)
- Pyrgulopsis pachyta (F. G. Thompson, 1977) - armored marstonia - Marstonia pachyta F.G. Thompson, 1977
- Pyrgulopsis scalariformis (Wolf, 1869) - moss pyrg - Marstonia scalariformis (Wolf, 1869)
