= Ash Meadows pebblesnail =

Conservation status
- Critically Endangered (IUCN 3.1)

- Critically Imperiled (NatureServe)

Scientific classification
- Kingdom: Animalia
- Phylum: Mollusca
- Class: Gastropoda
- Subclass: Caenogastropoda
- Order: Littorinimorpha
- Family: Hydrobiidae
- Genus: Pyrgulopsis
- Species: P. erythropoma

Binomial name
- Pyrgulopsis erythropoma (Pilsbry, 1899)

Synonyms
- Anculosa fusca var. minor Stearns, 1893; Fluminicola erythropoma Pilsbry, 1899

Species of gastropod

The Ash Meadows pebblesnail (Pyrgulopsis erythropoma) is a species of freshwater snail with a gill and an operculum, aquatic gastropod mollusk in the family Hydrobiidae.

This species is endemic to the Point of Rocks spring complex, Ash Meadows, Nevada, United States. Its natural habitat is springs. It is threatened by habitat loss.

The common name of this species is taken from the name of the Ash Meadows National Wildlife Refuge in Nevada.

== Description ==
Pyrgulopsis erythropoma is a small snail that has a height of 1.6–2.4 millimetres (0.063–0.094 in) and globose-turbinate, shell. Its differentiated from other Pyrgulopsis in that its penial filament has an absent lobe and elongate filament with the penial ornament consisting of a large, superficial ventral gland. It is distinguished from closely similar P. pisteri by its more globose shell, blade-like penis, and absence of anterior capsule gland vestibule.
