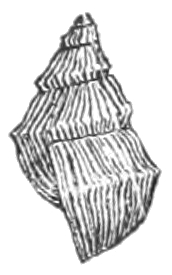
- Drawing of lateral view of the shell of Pyrgulopsis nevadensis.

Conservation status
- Extinct (IUCN 2.3)

- Presumed Extinct (NatureServe)

Scientific classification
- Kingdom: Animalia
- Phylum: Mollusca
- Class: Gastropoda
- Subclass: Caenogastropoda
- Order: Littorinimorpha
- Family: Hydrobiidae
- Genus: Pyrgulopsis
- Species: †P. nevadensis

Binomial name
- †Pyrgulopsis nevadensis (Stearns, 1883)

Synonyms
- Pyrgula nevadensis Stearns, 1883

= Corded pyrg =

Extinct species of gastropod

The corded pyrg, scientific name Pyrgulopsis nevadensis, is an extinct species of freshwater snail with a gill and an operculum, an aquatic gastropod mollusk in the family Hydrobiidae.

Pyrgulopsis nevadensis is the type species of the genus Pyrgulopsis.

== Shell description ==
The shell is small, somewhat elongated, variable, turreted and imperforate. The shell has 4½-5½ whorls, that are strongly unicarinate on periphery, otherwise smooth. The epidermis is shining, light straw in color or whitish. The suture is white. The suture is deeply and regularly impressed, made conspicuous by the approximating carina.

There existed also smooth variation. (plate II, figure 6-8.)

The aperture is very oblique, roundly ovate, with an angle on outer edge corresponding to the excavated carina, posteriorly sharply angled, well rounded before. The peritreme is continuous, almost rimate, closely appressed to parietal wall.

The operculum is light corneous, spiral and closely fitting the aperture.

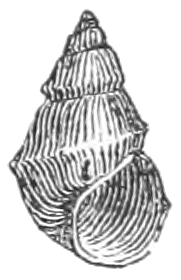
Drawing of apertural view of the shell of Pyrgulopsis nevadensis.

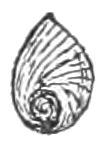
Drawing of operculum of Pyrgulopsis nevadensis.

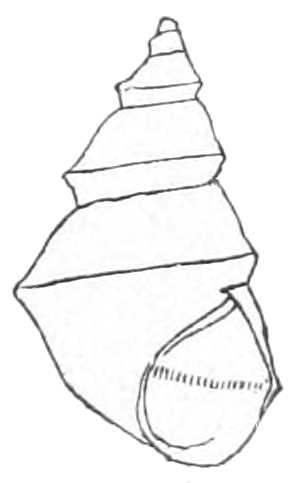
Drawing of apertural view of the shell of Pyrgulopsis nevadensis.

== Anatomy ==
Jaw is thin and membranaceous.

Detailed description of radula was provided by Charles Emerson Beecher in 1886 (page 11-12).

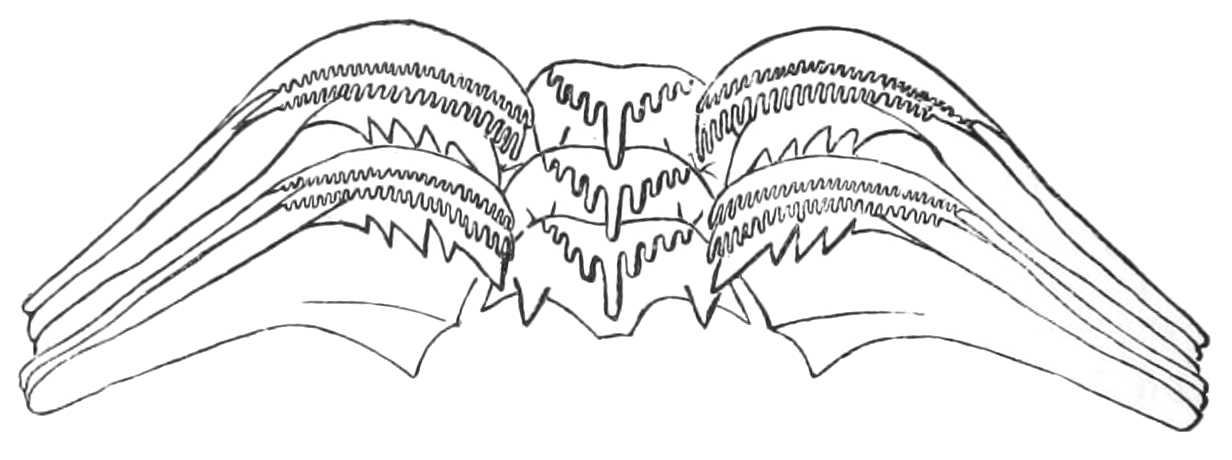
Drawing of radula of Pyrgulopsis nevadensis.

== Distribution ==
It was endemic to the United States. This species had a limited distribution, occurring only, so far as present information goes, in North-western Nevada, in Walker Lake and Pyramid Lake. Living forms have been collected only in the last-named locality.
