= Pyrgulopsis californiensis =

Laguna Mountain springsnail

Conservation status
- Vulnerable (NatureServe)

Scientific classification
- Kingdom: Animalia
- Phylum: Mollusca
- Class: Gastropoda
- Subclass: Caenogastropoda
- Order: Littorinimorpha
- Family: Hydrobiidae
- Genus: Pyrgulopsis
- Species: P. californiensis

Binomial name
- Pyrgulopsis californiensis (Gregg & Taylor, 1965)

Synonyms
- Fontelicella californiensis Gregg & Taylor, 1965

Species of gastropod

Pyrgulopsis californiensis, the Laguna Mountain springsnail, is a species of small freshwater snails with an operculum, aquatic gastropod molluscs or micromolluscs in the family Hydrobiidae.

This species' natural habitat is streams. It is endemic to Campo Creek, San Diego County, California, United States.

== Description ==
Pyrgulopsis californiensis is a small snail that has a height of 3.3–4.6 millimetres (0.13–0.18 in) and elongate-conic shell. Its differentiated from other Pyrgulopsis in that its penial filament has an elongate lobe and elongate filament with the penial ornament consisting of an elongate penial gland; large, curved, transverse terminal gland; and several ventral glands.
