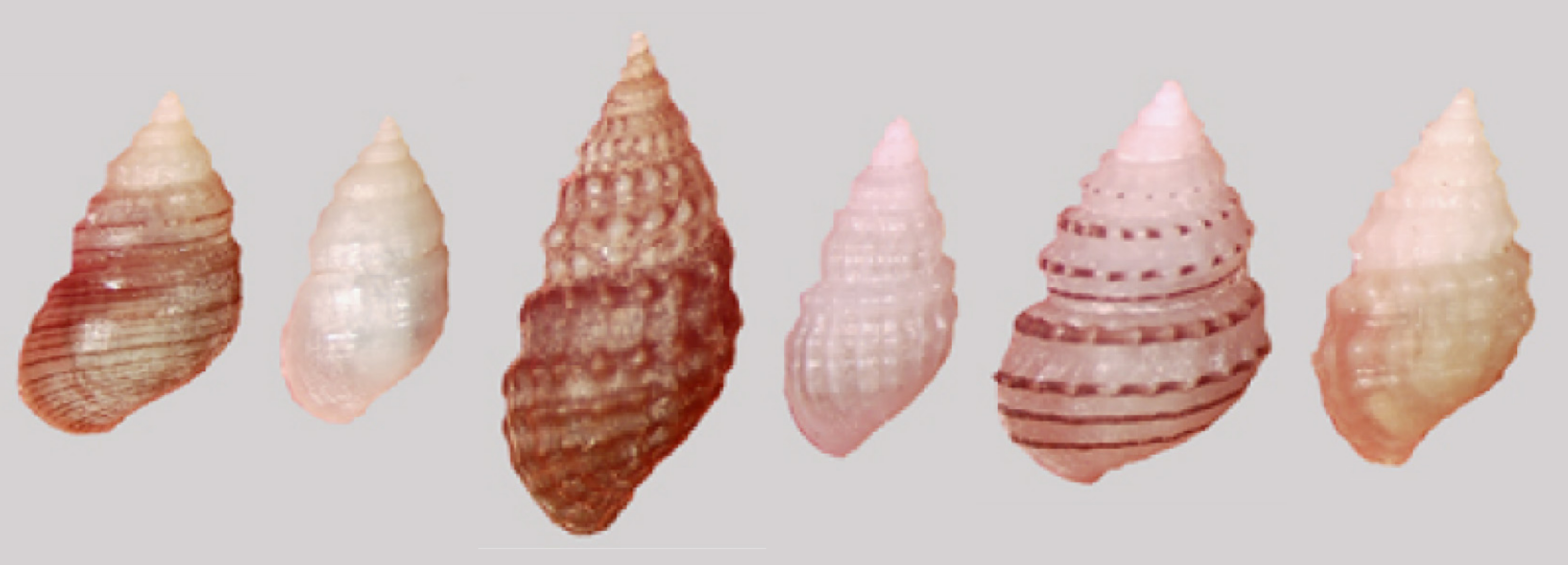
- A series of shells of Mexipyrgus carranzae, showing variation in size, shell sculpture, and color

Conservation status
- Data Deficient (IUCN 3.1)

Scientific classification
- Kingdom: Animalia
- Phylum: Mollusca
- Class: Gastropoda
- Subclass: Caenogastropoda
- Order: Littorinimorpha
- Family: Cochliopidae
- Genus: Mexipyrgus; Taylor, 1966
- Species: M. carranzae

Binomial name
- Mexipyrgus carranzae Taylor, 1966

Synonyms
- Mexipyrgus churinceanus Taylor, 1966; Mexipyrgus escobedae Taylor, 1966; Mexipyrgus lugoi Taylor, 1966; Mexipyrgus mojarralis Taylor, 1966; Mexipyrgus multilineatus Taylor, 1966

= Mexipyrgus =

Genus of gastropods

Mexipyrgus is a monotypic genus of very small freshwater snails, aquatic gastropod mollusks in the family Cochliopidae.

== Distribution ==
This genus is endemic to Cuatro Ciénegas valley, in Chihuahuan Desert, Mexico.

== Ecology ==
Mexipyrgus is generally found only in soft sediment.

Water lily Nymphaea ampla is the most common aquatic macrophyte in abundance in its habitats. According to the isotope analysis by Chaves-Campos et al. (2012) it is probable that Mexipyrgus churinceanus feed on water lily Nymphaea ampla organic matter metabolized by sediment bacteria.

Predators include the specialized snail-eating (molluscivorous) cichlid fish Herichthys minckleyi.
