= P. robusta =

P. robusta may refer to:

- Pancheria robusta, a plant species endemic to New Caledonia
- Pandesma robusta, a moth species found in the South of Europe, throughout Africa and from Asia Minor to India and Pakistan
- Partula robusta, an extinct gastropod species endemic to French Polynesia
- Pentagenia robusta, an insect species endemic to the United States
- Protarchaeopteryx robusta, a turkey-sized feathered theropod dinosaur species from China
- Pyrgulopsis robusta, the Jackson lake springsnail, a very small or minute freshwater snail species endemic to the United States

== See also ==
- Robusta
