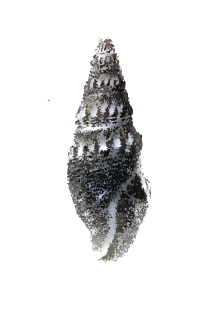
- Original image of a shell of Crassispira montereyensis

Scientific classification
- Kingdom: Animalia
- Phylum: Mollusca
- Class: Gastropoda
- Subclass: Caenogastropoda
- Order: Neogastropoda
- Superfamily: Conoidea
- Family: Pseudomelatomidae
- Genus: Crassispira
- Species: C. montereyensis

Binomial name
- Crassispira montereyensis (Stearns, 1871)

Synonyms
- Pleurotoma (Drillia) montereyensis Stearns, 1871

= Crassispira montereyensis =

Species of gastropod

Crassispira montereyensis is a species of sea snail, a marine gastropod mollusk in the family Pseudomelatomidae.

== Description ==
(Original description) The small, rather solid shell is elongate and slender. The spire is elevated and subacute. It contains 7-8 moderately rounded whorls. The upper portion consists of larger volutions somewhat concavely angulated. The suture is distinct. The color of the shell is dark purplish brown or black. The surface is covered with rather coarse, inconspicuous, revolving ribs, interrupted on the body whorl by rude incremental lines. The middle of upper whorls and upper part of the body whorl display fourteen to fifteen equidistant, longitudinal, nodose, slightly oblique ribs, which are whitish in the holotype (being somewhat rubbed) on the larger whorls. On the smaller volutions of the spire a puckering at and following the suture suggests a second indistinct series of nodules. The aperture is less than half the length of the shell. The siphonal canal is short. The terminal portion of columella is whitish and slightly twisted. The posterior sinus is rather broad rounded and of moderate depth.

== Distribution ==
This marine species occurs off California, United States.
