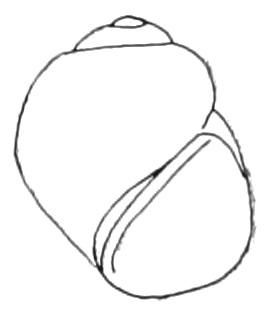
- Drawing of an apertural view of a shell of Pyrgulopsis neomexicana.

Conservation status
- Critically Endangered (IUCN 3.1)

- Endangered (ESA)

Scientific classification
- Kingdom: Animalia
- Phylum: Mollusca
- Class: Gastropoda
- Subclass: Caenogastropoda
- Order: Littorinimorpha
- Family: Hydrobiidae
- Genus: Pyrgulopsis
- Species: P. neomexicana

Binomial name
- Pyrgulopsis neomexicana (Pilsbry, 1916)

Synonyms
- Amnicola neomexicana Pilsbry; Fontelicella neomexicana (Pilsbry)

= Socorro springsnail =

Species of gastropod

The Socorro springsnail, scientific name Pyrgulopsis neomexicana, is an endangered species of minute freshwater snail with a gill and an operculum, an aquatic gastropod mollusk or micromollusk in the family Hydrobiidae, the mud snails.

This tiny snail previously inhabited a small group of thermal springs in the State of New Mexico, USA. Its survival is seriously endangered because its habitat is both vulnerable and severely threatened. The current status of the population of this snail and its habitat area is unknown. The Socorro springsnail has been listed as endangered by the governments of the United States and New Mexico.

Very little is known about this snail in general, because of its minute size, its very restricted range, and the fact that the places where it currently lives are on private property which allows no access.

== Taxonomy ==
The Socorro springsnail was originally described from warm springs in Socorro, New Mexico. The collector and date of the unique first sample are unknown. Specimens came from the collection of American mineralogist Charles Moore Wheatley (1822 Essex, England - 1882, Phoenixville, Pennsylvania, U.S.A.) and were likely collected in the 19th century. The species was formally described and named Amnicola neomexicana by American malacologist (mollusk expert) Henry Augustus Pilsbry in 1916.

Pilsbry's original type description, the text where the species is officially named and described, reads as follows:

The shell is very small, minutely perforate, globose, corneous, rather solid. Surface smooth, not glossy. Whorls 3, moderately convex, the suture not deeply impressed. Aperture ovate, strongly oblique, angular above. Peristome continuous, the outer margin regularly arched, inner margin straight, slightly thickened. Length 1.6, diam. 1.3 mm.; longest axis of aperture about 1 mm.

Socorro, New Mexico, in warm springs. Types no. 121,113 in the Wheatley collection, deposited in Mus. A. N. S. P.

This species, known by many specimens, is smaller than Amnicola micrococcus, with a narrow aperture, straight inner lip and less impressed suture. Nearly all of the shells are eroded, the spire being deeply corroded in fully adult individuals. This gives an abrupt outline of the suture, in front view.

In 1982, American zoologist John B. Burch reclassified the Socorro springsnail as Fontelicella neomexicana. In 1987, two other American zoologists, Robert Hershler from the National Museum of Natural History and Fred Gilbert Thompson from the Florida State Museum (now the Florida Museum of Natural History) assigned members of the genus Fontelicella, including F. neomexicana, to the genus Pyrgulopsis.

== Description ==
The Socorro springsnail has an elongate-ovate conical shell that is light tan and short-spired, in other words the shell is low and rounded, without much of a pointed "tip" to it. The shell has 3.5–4.5 whorls. The protoconch is usually eroded. The internal callus is reddish brown to amber, and the operculum is pale. The height of the shell is 1.6–2.3 mm, and its aperture is ovate.

The body, head, snout and tentacles are dark gray to black in color. The tentacles range from black or dark gray at the base, to pale gray at the tips. Female snails are larger than males. In the male, the penis has a long glandular strip on the terminal lobe, a long penial gland, and three shorter dorsal glandular strips. A detailed description of the reproductive system of this snail species was provided by Hershler in 1994.

The animal respires by using a type of gill known as a ctenidium (a comb-like respiratory apparatus) which in this species has 20 tall and narrow ctenidial filaments.

In all of the species in the genus Pyrgulopsis, the radula (a strong rasping feeding ribbon covered in microscopic teeth) is of taenioglossan type (seven teeth in each row, i.e. one middle, two laterals and 4 marginals.) The radula of Pyrgulopsis neomexicana was described in detail by Hershler (1994).

== Distribution ==
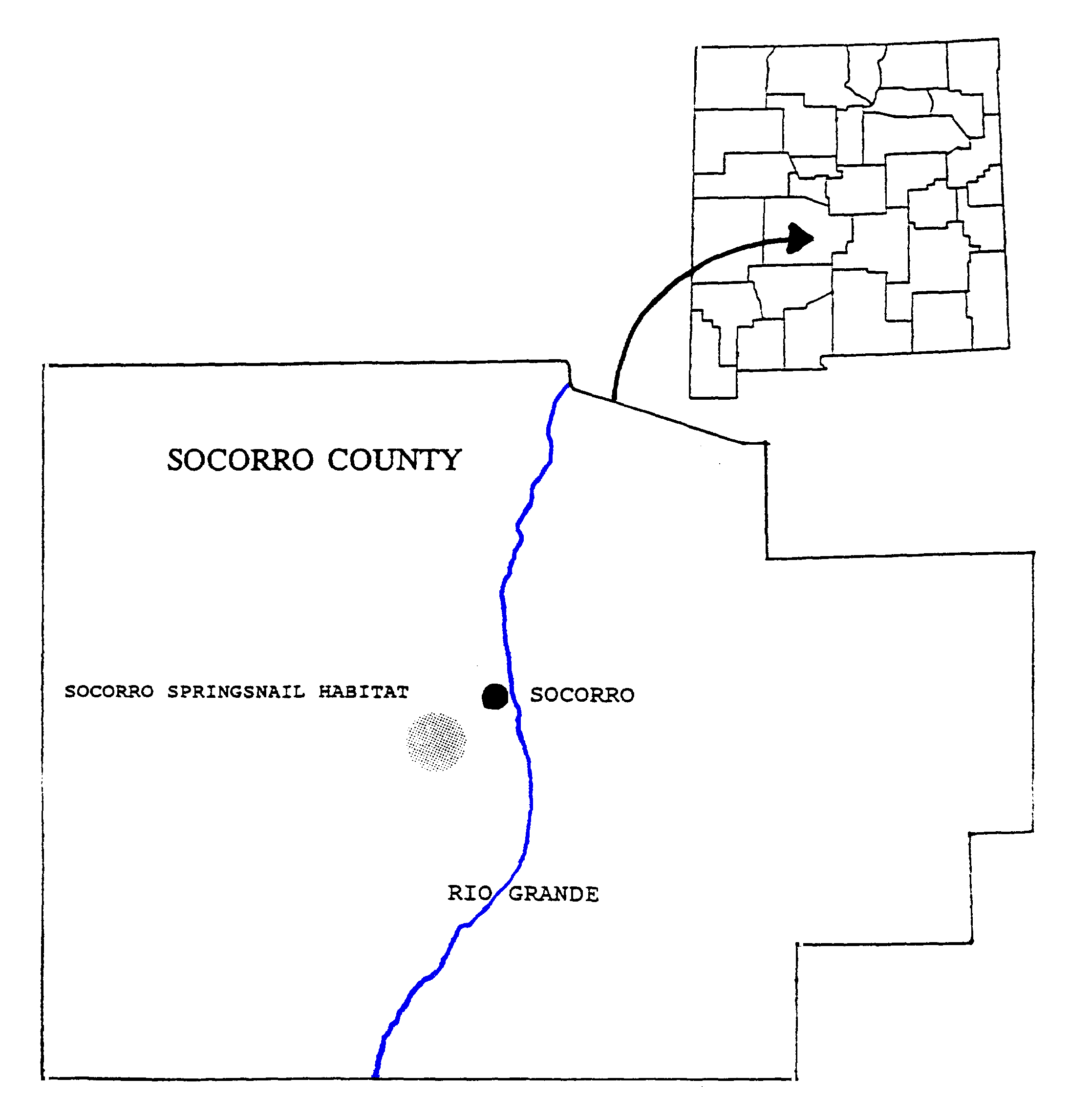
Map of the distribution of Pyrgulopsis neomexicana.

This species is endemic to Socorro County in central New Mexico in the southwestern United States. The original specimen of the Socorro springsnail reportedly came from a thermal spring near Socorro, New Mexico.

It is now extinct at the type locality, but the date and cause of the extinction are uncertain. The species has been reported from other springs in Socorro County (Landye 1981), although there is disagreement on whether the species historically occurred there. Currently, the Socorro springsnail is known from only one spring: the Torreon Spring in Socorro County, New Mexico, where it was located in 1979.

== Ecology ==
=== Habitat ===
The Socorro springsnail is entirely aquatic, occurring in low-velocity (slow-moving) water near spring sources in a thermal habitat, i.e. near hot springs. More precisely, it is found in the uppermost layer of an organic muck substrate or surface.

The principal spring source where the Socorro springsnail is currently found has been impounded (artificially enclosed, blocked off or dammed), and this has reduced the flowing-water habitat to a very small pool. Only one tiny spring source remains, and this has a small improved pool (less than 1 m^{2} in area), with a water temperature of 17 °C. The species is abundant on rootlets in this pool, but is not found in the ditches and ponds radiating from the spring into irrigation structures. Other mollusks found in the vicinity include Physa mexicana, Lymnaea modicella, and Pisidium casertanum. In 1981, the colony of Socorro springsnails was found to occupy not only the source, but also the outflow tributary about 2.5 m (8 ft) long to an irrigation ditch. No snails were found in the irrigation flow itself however. In 1991, the total population of the Socorro springsnail in the spring outflow was estimated at 5,000 individuals.

The snail had formerly occurred throughout the thermal springs west of the city of Socorro, living in the same habitats as the Socorro isopod Thermosphaeroma thermophilum.

=== Feeding habits ===
This species is herbivorous. It feeds on algae and other materials that occur in the organic film which is found on the surface of plants and debris.

=== Life cycle ===
The females of the Socorro springsnail are oviparous, in other words, they lay eggs. They probably deposit eggs in spring and summer.

== Threats ==
The limited range and precise habitat demands of the Socorro springsnail makes this species vulnerable to habitat loss or alteration. Potential threats to the species include all activities that would significantly reduce either spring flow or availability of the food source that supports this springsnail species. Alterations to the watersheds, springs, or associated runs could cause a reduction in water flow, a change in water temperature or water quality, or could modify the habitat or food source. This could have a devastating impact on the existing populations of the snail.

This snail species has extremely limited dispersal capabilities, which means it has little or no ability to find, and disperse to, other suitable habitats, or to move out of a habitat where the conditions have changed such that it is no longer suitable. Consequently, these snails are unable to avoid contaminants or other unfavorable changes to their habitat.

The population of the Socorro springsnail is thought to be limited to a single pool which is less than 1 m^{2} in area, and an outflow ditch about 2.5 m (8 ft) in length. Several of the springs that formerly contained the Socorro springsnail have been impounded, and this has eliminated the precise habitat that is critical for the species’ survival.

Perhaps the greatest threat facing this species is the potential loss of water flow. Excessive pumping from the aquifer that supplies water to the springs could destroy both the springs themselves and the species along with them. Potential pollution of the spring could negatively impact this species and perhaps could also cause its extinction. The effects of climate change, if they include widespread drought, decreased spring discharge, or a change in water chemistry, are a newly recognized threat that could eliminate the species.

== Conservation ==
The State of New Mexico listed the Socorro springsnail as endangered, group 2, on March 28, 1985 (Section 17—2—37 through 17—2—46 NMSA 1978). On October 30, 1991, the U.S. Fish and Wildlife Service also listed this species as endangered under the Endangered Species Act of 1973. Because of the extremely limited distribution, the recovery strategy for this species has its foundation in the maintenance of their habitat. While it is possible that additional populations might be established in other thermal springs, this possibility is contingent upon finding springs within the species’ presumed historic range that have the physical and biologic attributes, including terrestrial habitat components, that the springsnail requires to survive, and which do not support their own endemic fauna.

The locality is on private land and access to the spring has been denied since 1995. Because of this, the recent population numbers are unknown, the status of the habitat is unknown, and the magnitude of current threats is also unknown. Lack of cooperation by the private land owner and impacts caused by their actions were not specifically identified as a threat. However the U.S. Fish and Wildlife Service recommendations for further actions suggested that efforts should continue in an attempt to gain access to the spring. If and when access is granted, it was recommended that life history studies should be carried out, monitor population numbers should be monitored, the attributes of suitable habitat should be determined (qualities like the exact nature of the preferred substrate, the water temperature limits, pH, hardness, alkalinity etc.) and that long-term monitoring of discharge and temperature should be set up. If on the other hand, access continues to be denied, the recommendation was to attempt to set up a one-time visit to the spring in order to collect individuals for a captive refugium population.

A decision was made by the U.S. Fish and Wildlife Service not to implement the part of the Endangered Species Act which allows the authorities to acquire land as necessary if it is "critical habitat" for the conservation of a listed species, because it was felt in this situation that making the land public would actually expose the remaining population to an even greater risk of extinction from threats such as vandalism and collection by unauthorized parties. A habitat management plan had not yet been written for the species as of 2008, as was directed by the 1994 recovery plan, which also covered another species, the Alamosa springsnail. The 1994 recovery plan is out of date and needs to be revised and updated. It was recommended that a separate plan should be created.
