= Pyrgulopsis arizonae =

Apache springsnail

Conservation status
- Critically Imperiled (NatureServe)

Scientific classification
- Kingdom: Animalia
- Phylum: Mollusca
- Class: Gastropoda
- Subclass: Caenogastropoda
- Order: Littorinimorpha
- Family: Hydrobiidae
- Genus: Pyrgulopsis
- Species: P. arizonae

Binomial name
- Pyrgulopsis arizonae (Taylor, 1987)

Synonyms
- Apachecoccus arizonae Taylor, 1987; Pyrgulopsis sancarlosensis Hershler, 1988

Species of gastropod

Pyrgulopsis arizonae, commonly known as the Apache springsnail, is a species of small freshwater snails with an operculum, aquatic gastropod molluscs or micromolluscs in the family Hydrobiidae.

This species' natural habitat is springs. It is endemic to an unnamed spring on north side of Gila River about 2 miles (3.2 km) north of Bylas, Arizona, United States.

== Description ==
Pyrgulopsis arizonae is a small snail that has a height of 3.3–4.6 millimetres (0.13–0.18 in) and a globose to elongate conic shell. Its differentiated from other Pyrgulopsis in that its penial filament has an elongate lobe and medium length, broad filament with the penial ornament consisting of a large, superficial ventral gland often with a similar dorsal gland.
