= Pyrgulopsis aardahli =

Benton Valley springsnail

Conservation status
- Critically Imperiled (NatureServe)

Scientific classification
- Kingdom: Animalia
- Phylum: Mollusca
- Class: Gastropoda
- Subclass: Caenogastropoda
- Order: Littorinimorpha
- Family: Hydrobiidae
- Genus: Pyrgulopsis
- Species: P. aardahli

Binomial name
- Pyrgulopsis aardahli Hershler, 1989

Species of gastropod

Pyrgulopsis aardahli, commonly known as the Benton Valley springsnail, is a species of freshwater snails in the family Hydrobiidae.

This species' natural habitat is springs. It is endemic to a spring on the Bramlette Ranch, Mono County, California, United States.

== Description ==
Pyrgulopsis aardahli is a small snail that has a height of 2.6–3.4 millimetres (0.10–0.13 in) and ovate to conical shell. Its differentiated from other Pyrgulopsis in that its penis has a very small lobe and short filament with the penial ornament consisting of a small, circular terminal gland and a stalked ventral gland.
