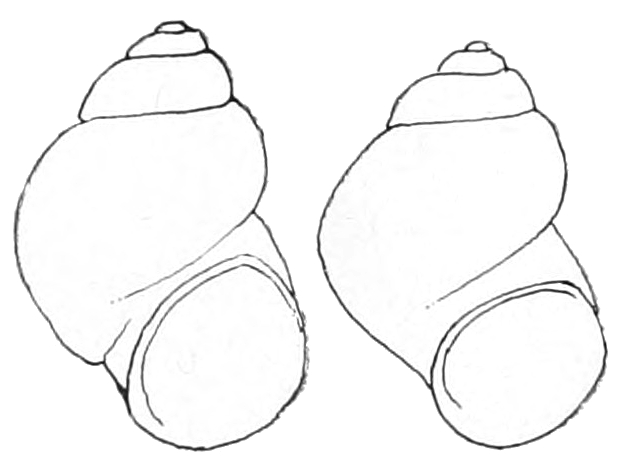
- Drawing of apertural view of two shells of Pyrgulopsis deserta.

Conservation status
- Imperiled (NatureServe)

Scientific classification
- Kingdom: Animalia
- Phylum: Mollusca
- Class: Gastropoda
- Subclass: Caenogastropoda
- Order: Littorinimorpha
- Family: Hydrobiidae
- Genus: Pyrgulopsis
- Species: P. deserta

Binomial name
- Pyrgulopsis deserta (Pilsbry, 1916)

Synonyms
- Amnicola deserta Pilsbry, 1916

= Pyrgulopsis deserta =

Species of gastropod

Pyrgulopsis deserta is a species of freshwater snail in the family Hydrobiidae, the mud snails. It is known by the common names desert springsnail, Virgin springsnail, and St. George snail. It occurs in southwestern Utah and northwestern Arizona in the United States.

== Original description ==
Pyrgulopsis deserta was originally described as Amnicola deserta by Henry Augustus Pilsbry in 1916.

Pilsbry's original text (the type description) reads as follows:

The shell is very small, perforate, broadly ovate, corneous,

translucent, thin; surface glossy, very minutely marked with delicate growth-lines. The outlines of the spire are convex, the apex somewhat pointed. Whorls 3½, strongly convex, the last more rapidly descending close to the aperture. The aperture is ovate, somewhat oblique, angular above. Peristome continuous and free from the preceding whorl. Length 2.4, diam. 1.7 mm.; longest axis of aperture 1.25 mm. Length 2.2, diam. 1.6 mm.

Washington Co., Utah. Types no. 121,112, Wheatley collection, in coll. A. N. S. P.

This little shell resembles the larger Bythinella palomasensis, from Lake Palomas in northern Chihuahua (NAUTILUS IX, 68, Oct., 1895; Dall, Proc. U. S. Nat. Mus. XIX, 1897, p. 369, pi. 31, fig. 9). The present species is broader, and evidently old individuals are smaller. The generic position is uncertain. As between a short Paludestrina and a long Amnicola there is little choice.

Washington county is in the southwestern angle of Utah, drained by the Virgin river, flowing into the Colorado. The specimens are "dead" shells, but not fossil, I think. According to the label, Oreohelix strigosa was found in the same place. The collector was not given for this or the preceding.

All of the adult specimens of A. deserta have the last whorl shortly free at the aperture. It is a senile form, probably extinct or on the verge of extinction, Amnicolidae lead a precarious existence in the arid states. The rivers do not afford suitable stations. They have apparently never gained access to the small perennial streams of the higher mountains; and permanent springs and streams are so rare on the lower levels that the colonies are small, few and widely separated. The large proportion of extremely diminutive species in the arid region is remarkable. It may, perhaps, be looked upon as a permanent

dwarfing due to unfavorable conditions.
