= Fossil springsnail =

Conservation status
- Data Deficient (IUCN 2.3)

- Critically Imperiled (NatureServe)

Scientific classification
- Kingdom: Animalia
- Phylum: Mollusca
- Class: Gastropoda
- Subclass: Caenogastropoda
- Order: Littorinimorpha
- Family: Hydrobiidae
- Genus: Pyrgulopsis
- Species: P. simplex

Binomial name
- Pyrgulopsis simplex Hershler, 1988

Species of gastropod

The fossil springsnail, scientific name Pyrgulopsis simplex, is a species of small freshwater spring snails, aquatic gastropod mollusks or micromollusks in the family Hydrobiidae. This species is endemic to the United States.
