= Duckwater pyrg =

Conservation status
- Endangered (IUCN 2.3)

- Critically Imperiled (NatureServe)

Scientific classification
- Kingdom: Animalia
- Phylum: Mollusca
- Class: Gastropoda
- Subclass: Caenogastropoda
- Order: Littorinimorpha
- Family: Hydrobiidae
- Genus: Pyrgulopsis
- Species: P. aloba

Binomial name
- Pyrgulopsis aloba Hershler, 1998

Species of gastropod

The Duckwater pyrg, scientific name Pyrgulopsis aloba, is a species of freshwater snail in the family Hydrobiidae. It is endemic to the United States and only known from two springs in the Duckwater Reservation, Nye County, Nevada.

It is a small Pyrgulopsis with a shell height of 1–1.9 mm (0.04–0.07 in) and shell width of 1–1.7 mm (0.04–0.07 in).
