= Kingman springsnail =

Conservation status
- Vulnerable (IUCN 3.1)

- Critically Imperiled (NatureServe)

Scientific classification
- Kingdom: Animalia
- Phylum: Mollusca
- Class: Gastropoda
- Subclass: Caenogastropoda
- Order: Littorinimorpha
- Family: Hydrobiidae
- Genus: Pyrgulopsis
- Species: P. conica

Binomial name
- Pyrgulopsis conica Hershler, 1988

Synonyms
- Pyrgulopsis conicus Hershler, 1988

Species of gastropod

The Kingman springsnail (Pyrgulopsis conica) is a species of freshwater snail in the family Hydrobiidae, the mud snails. It is endemic to Mohave County, Arizona, in the United States.

It lives in aquatic habitat in the Black Mountains near Kingman, Arizona. It is known from only three springs, where it may be threatened by loss of groundwater. A single drought event could threaten the entire population of the species.

== Description ==
Pyrgulopsis conica has a shell that is 1.8–2.7 millimetres (0.071–0.106 in) tall. It is convex in shape to rounded with shoulders. Its differentiated from other Pyrgulopsis in that its penial filament has a medium length lobe and medium length filament with the penial ornament consisting of a near-circular terminal gland.
