= Pyrgulopsis castaicensis =

Conservation status
- Critically Imperiled (NatureServe)

Scientific classification
- Kingdom: Animalia
- Phylum: Mollusca
- Class: Gastropoda
- Subclass: Caenogastropoda
- Order: Littorinimorpha
- Family: Hydrobiidae
- Genus: Pyrgulopsis
- Species: P. castaicensis

Binomial name
- Pyrgulopsis castaicensis Hershler & Liu, 2010

Species of gastropod

Pyrgulopsis castaicensis is a species of very small freshwater snail with an operculum, an aquatic gastropod mollusk in the family Hydrobiidae.

== Distribution ==
Pyrgulopsis castaicensis occurs in only one spring in the upper part of the Santa Clara River basin, in southwestern California.
