= Pyrgulopsis bedfordensis =

Conservation status
- Critically Imperiled (NatureServe)

Scientific classification
- Kingdom: Animalia
- Phylum: Mollusca
- Class: Gastropoda
- Subclass: Caenogastropoda
- Order: Littorinimorpha
- Family: Hydrobiidae
- Genus: Pyrgulopsis
- Species: P. bedfordensis

Binomial name
- Pyrgulopsis bedfordensis Hershler & Gustafson, 2001

Species of gastropod

Pyrgulopsis bedfordensis, is a species of small freshwater snails with an operculum, aquatic gastropod molluscs or micromolluscs in the family Hydrobiidae. It is listed as critically imperiled on the Montana Species of Concern list.

This species is endemic to a 2-kilometre (1.2 mi) stretch of Bedford Spring Creek near Townsend, Montana, United States. Its natural habitat is streams.
