= Pyrgulopsis perforata =

Scientific classification
- Kingdom: Animalia
- Phylum: Mollusca
- Class: Gastropoda
- Subclass: Caenogastropoda
- Order: Littorinimorpha
- Family: Hydrobiidae
- Genus: Pyrgulopsis
- Species: P. perforata

Binomial name
- Pyrgulopsis perforata Hershler, Liu & Bradford, 2013

Species of gastropod

Pyrgulopsis perforata, is a species of small freshwater snails with an operculum, aquatic gastropod molluscs or micromolluscs in the family Hydrobiidae.

This species is endemic to Grapevine Canyon and the Grapevine Mountains in the Amargosa River basin in Inyo County, California, United States. Its natural habitat is springs.

== Description ==
Pyrgulopsis perforata is a small snail that has a maximum height of 2.6 millimetres (0.10 in) and a broad ovate conical shell. It has a larger distal lobe and smaller gland on the penis compared to other Pyrgulopsis.
