= Pyrgulopsis licina =

Scientific classification
- Kingdom: Animalia
- Phylum: Mollusca
- Class: Gastropoda
- Subclass: Caenogastropoda
- Order: Littorinimorpha
- Family: Hydrobiidae
- Genus: Pyrgulopsis
- Species: P. licina

Binomial name
- Pyrgulopsis licina Hershler, Liu & Bradford, 2013

Species of gastropod

Pyrgulopsis licina, is a species of small freshwater snails with an operculum, aquatic gastropod molluscs or micromolluscs in the family Hydrobiidae.

This species is endemic to Ash Meadows along the Amargosa River in Nevada, United States. Its natural habitat is springs.

== Description ==
Pyrgulopsis licina is a small snail that has a maximum height of 2.4 millimetres (0.094 in) and narrow conical shell. It has an absence of glands on its penis and a strongly curved penial filament leading to its name P. licina from the Latin licinus, meaning bent or turned upward.
