= Davis County springsnail =

Conservation status
- Data Deficient (IUCN 2.3)

- Critically Imperiled (NatureServe)

Scientific classification
- Kingdom: Animalia
- Phylum: Mollusca
- Class: Gastropoda
- Subclass: Caenogastropoda
- Order: Littorinimorpha
- Family: Hydrobiidae
- Genus: Pyrgulopsis
- Species: P. davisi

Binomial name
- Pyrgulopsis davisi (Taylor, 1987)

Synonyms
- Fontelicella davisi Taylor, 1987

Species of gastropod

The Davis County springsnail, scientific name Pyrgulopsis davisi, is a species of small freshwater snails with a gill and an operculum, aquatic gastropod mollusk in the family Hydrobiidae.

This species' natural habitat is streams. It is endemic to a tributary of Limpia Creek about 5 miles (8.0 km) northeast of Fort Davis, Texas, United States.

== Description ==
Pyrgulopsis davisi is a small snail that has a height of 1.8–2.6 millimetres (0.071–0.102 in) and an ovate to narrowly conic, medium-sized shell. Its differentiated from other Pyrgulopsis in that its penial filament has a medium length lobe and medium length filament with the penial ornament consisting of an elongate, proximally bifurcate, penial gland; curved, transverse terminal and ventral glands.
