= Moapa pebblesnail =

Conservation status
- Vulnerable (IUCN 3.1)

- Critically Imperiled (NatureServe)

Scientific classification
- Kingdom: Animalia
- Phylum: Mollusca
- Class: Gastropoda
- Subclass: Caenogastropoda
- Order: Littorinimorpha
- Family: Hydrobiidae
- Genus: Pyrgulopsis
- Species: P. avernalis

Binomial name
- Pyrgulopsis avernalis (Pilsbry, 1935)

Synonyms
- Fluminicola avernalis Pilsbry

Species of gastropod

The Moapa pebblesnail also known as the Muddy Valley turban snail, scientific name Pyrgulopsis avernalis, is a species of small freshwater snail with an operculum, an aquatic gastropod mollusk in the family Hydrobiidae.

The natural habitat of this species is springs, and it is currently threatened by habitat loss. This species is endemic to the Moapa Valley, Nevada, United States and the common name refers to the Moapa River in Nevada.

== Description ==
Pyrgulopsis avernalis is a small snail that has a height of 2.4–4.3 millimetres (0.094–0.169 in) and ovate conical shell. Its differentiated from other Pyrgulopsis in that its penial filament has a small lobe and large filament with the penial ornament consisting of a small terminal gland, a gland along the outer edge of the penial lobe and a ventral gland.

== Genus transfer ==
When originally described in 1935, it was assigned to the genus Fluminicola. In 1994, it was transferred to the genus Pyrgulopsis.
