= Pyrgulopsis archimedis =

Conservation status
- Critically Imperiled (NatureServe)

Scientific classification
- Kingdom: Animalia
- Phylum: Mollusca
- Class: Gastropoda
- Subclass: Caenogastropoda
- Order: Littorinimorpha
- Family: Hydrobiidae
- Genus: Pyrgulopsis
- Species: P. archimedis

Binomial name
- Pyrgulopsis archimedis (Berry, 1947)

Species of gastropod

Pyrgulopsis archimedis, commonly known as the archimedes pyrg, is a species of small freshwater snails with an operculum, aquatic gastropod molluscs or micromolluscs in the family Hydrobiidae.

This species' natural habitat is rivers and lakes. It is endemic to the Upper Klamath Lake and the uppermost portion of the Link River near Algoma, Oregon, United States.

== Description ==
Pyrgulopsis archimedis is a small snail that has a height of 4–6 millimetres (0.16–0.24 in) and a conical shell. Its differentiated from other Pyrgulopsis in that its penial filament has a medium lobe and medium filament with the penial ornament consisting of a short, transverse penial gland, short, transverse terminal gland, and stalked ventral gland.
