= Pseudotryonia alamosae =

Alamosa springsnail

Conservation status
- Data Deficient (IUCN 3.1)

- Critically Imperiled (NatureServe)
- Endangered (ESA)

Scientific classification
- Kingdom: Animalia
- Phylum: Mollusca
- Class: Gastropoda
- Subclass: Caenogastropoda
- Order: Littorinimorpha
- Family: Cochliopidae
- Genus: Pseudotryonia
- Species: P. alamosae

Binomial name
- Pseudotryonia alamosae (Taylor, 1987)

Synonyms
- Tryonia (Paupertryonia) alamosae Taylor, 1987

Species of gastropod

Pseudotryonia alamosae, commonly known as the Caliente tryonia or Alamosa springsnail, is a species of small freshwater snail, an aquatic prosobranch gastropod mollusk in the family Cochliopidae.

The species is endemic to Socorro County, New Mexico in the United States, where only one population is known. It was placed on the federal endangered species list along with the Socorro springsnail in 1991.

The snail occurs in five small connected springs within half a mile of each other; this is thought to be a single population. The snail was discovered in 1979 and described to science as a new species in 1987.
