= Phantom cave snail =

Conservation status
- Vulnerable (IUCN 3.1)

- Endangered (ESA)

Scientific classification
- Kingdom: Animalia
- Phylum: Mollusca
- Class: Gastropoda
- Subclass: Caenogastropoda
- Order: Littorinimorpha
- Family: Hydrobiidae
- Genus: Pyrgulopsis
- Species: P. texana

Binomial name
- Pyrgulopsis texana (Pilsbry, 1935)

Synonyms
- Cochliopa texana Pilsbry, 1935

Species of gastropod

The phantom cave snail or phantom cavesnail (Pyrgulopsis texana) is a species of very small freshwater snail with an operculum, an aquatic gastropod in the family Hydrobiidae.

== Distribution ==
This species is endemic to the lower Pecos River basin, Texas, the United States.

== Genus transfer ==
When originally described in 1935, the phantom cave snail was assigned to the genus Cochliopa. Following a detailed examination of shell and anatomical characteristics along with genetic sequencing it was transferred to the genus Pyrgulopsis in 2010.
