= Chupadera springsnail =

Conservation status
- Data Deficient (IUCN 2.3)

- Critically Imperiled (NatureServe)

Scientific classification
- Kingdom: Animalia
- Phylum: Mollusca
- Class: Gastropoda
- Subclass: Caenogastropoda
- Order: Littorinimorpha
- Family: Hydrobiidae
- Genus: Pyrgulopsis
- Species: P. chupaderae

Binomial name
- Pyrgulopsis chupaderae (Taylor, 1987)

Synonyms
- Fontelicella chupadera Taylor, 1987

Species of gastropod

The Chupadera springsnail, scientific name Pyrgulopsis chupaderae, is a species of small freshwater snails with an operculum, aquatic gastropod molluscs or micromolluscs in the family Hydrobiidae.

This species' natural habitat is springs. It is endemic to Willow Spring at the south end of the Chupadera Mountains, about 5 miles (8.0 km) west of Bosque del Apache National Wildlife Refuge headquarters, New Mexico, United States.

== Description ==
Pyrgulopsis chupaderae is a small snail that has a height of 1.6–2.8 millimetres (0.063–0.110 in) and an ovate-conic to elongate-conic, small to medium-sized shell. Its differentiated from other Pyrgulopsis in that its penial filament has a medium length lobe and medium length filament with the penial ornament consisting of an elongate penial gland; curved, transverse terminal gland; and ventral gland.
