= Pyrgulopsis carinifera =

Conservation status
- Critically Imperiled (NatureServe)

Scientific classification
- Kingdom: Animalia
- Phylum: Mollusca
- Class: Gastropoda
- Subclass: Caenogastropoda
- Order: Littorinimorpha
- Family: Hydrobiidae
- Genus: Pyrgulopsis
- Species: P. carinifera

Binomial name
- Pyrgulopsis carinifera (Pilsbry, 1935)

Synonyms
- Fluminicola avernalis carinifera Pilsbry, 1935

Species of gastropod

Pyrgulopsis carinifera is a species of minute freshwater snails with an operculum, aquatic gastropod molluscs or micromolluscs in the family Hydrobiidae.

This species' natural habitat is springs. It is endemic to springs in the Moapa Valley, southern Nevada, United States.

== Description ==
Pyrgulopsis carinifera is a small snail that has a height of 3.8–5.0 millimetres (0.15–0.20 in) and a trochoid shell. Its differentiated from other Pyrgulopsis in that its penial filament has a medium, distally bifurcated lobe and medium length filament with the penial ornament consisting of a fragmented terminal gland.

== Taxonomy ==
Pyrgulopsis carinifera was originally described as Fluminicola avernalis carinifera in 1935. In 1994, it was transferred to the genus Pyrgulopsis.
