= Pyrgulopsis bryantwalkeri =

Cortez Hills pebblesnail

Conservation status
- Critically Imperiled (NatureServe)

Scientific classification
- Kingdom: Animalia
- Phylum: Mollusca
- Class: Gastropoda
- Subclass: Caenogastropoda
- Order: Littorinimorpha
- Family: Hydrobiidae
- Genus: Pyrgulopsis
- Species: P. bryantwalkeri

Binomial name
- Pyrgulopsis bryantwalkeri (Hershler, 1994)

Synonyms
- Fluminicola nevadensis Walker, 1916

Species of gastropod

Pyrgulopsis bryantwalkeri, the Cortez Hills pebblesnail, is a species of small freshwater snail with an operculum, aquatic gastropod molluscs or micromolluscs in the family Hydrobiidae.

This species' natural habitat is springs. It is endemic to a spring in the Cortez foot-hills, Elko County, Nevada, United States.

== Description ==
Pyrgulopsis bryantwalkeri is a small snail that has a height of 1.5–3.2 millimetres (0.059–0.126 in) and globose to ovate-conic shell. Its differentiated from other Pyrgulopsis in that its penial filament has a very weak lobe and short filament with the penial ornament consisting of a weakly developed terminal gland.
