= Naegele springsnail =

Conservation status
- Endangered (IUCN 3.1)

- Critically Imperiled (NatureServe)

Scientific classification
- Kingdom: Animalia
- Phylum: Mollusca
- Class: Gastropoda
- Subclass: Caenogastropoda
- Order: Littorinimorpha
- Family: Hydrobiidae
- Genus: Pyrgulopsis
- Species: P. metcalfi

Binomial name
- Pyrgulopsis metcalfi (Taylor, 1987)

Synonyms
- Fontelicella metcalfi Taylor, 1987

Species of gastropod

The Naegele springsnail, also known as the Presidio County springsnail, scientific name Pyrgulopsis metcalfi, is a species of very small or minute freshwater snail with an operculum, an aquatic gastropod mollusk in the family Hydrobiidae.

This species is endemic to the United States. Its natural habitat is springs. It is threatened by habitat loss.
