= Transverse grand pyrg =

Conservation status
- Endangered (IUCN 2.3)

- Critically Imperiled (NatureServe)

Scientific classification
- Kingdom: Animalia
- Phylum: Mollusca
- Class: Gastropoda
- Subclass: Caenogastropoda
- Order: Littorinimorpha
- Family: Hydrobiidae
- Genus: Pyrgulopsis
- Species: P. cruciglans

Binomial name
- Pyrgulopsis cruciglans Hershler, 1998

Species of gastropod

The transverse grand pyrg, scientific name Pyrgulopsis cruciglans, is a species of very small freshwater snail with a gill and an operculum, an aquatic gastropod mollusk in the family Hydrobiidae. This species is endemic to the United States.
