= Pyrgulopsis sanchezi =

Scientific classification
- Kingdom: Animalia
- Phylum: Mollusca
- Class: Gastropoda
- Subclass: Caenogastropoda
- Order: Littorinimorpha
- Family: Hydrobiidae
- Genus: Pyrgulopsis
- Species: P. sanchezi

Binomial name
- Pyrgulopsis sanchezi Hershler, Liu & Bradford, 2013

Species of gastropod

Pyrgulopsis sanchezi, is a species of small freshwater snails with an operculum, aquatic gastropod molluscs or micromolluscs in the family Hydrobiidae.

This species is endemic to the Amargosa River basin in California and Nevada, United States. Its natural habitat is springs.

== Description ==
Pyrgulopsis sanchezi is a small snail that has a maximum height of 2.9 millimetres (0.11 in) and ovate to narrow conical shell. It has a short, strongly tapering penial filament that differentiates it from other Pyrgulopsis.

== Etymology ==
The species is named for Peter G. Sanchez, former Resource Management Specialist for Death Valley National Park, who was instrumental in efforts to protect and conserve regional springsnails and their associated aquatic habitats.
