= Pecos springsnail =

Conservation status
- Data Deficient (IUCN 2.3)

Scientific classification
- Kingdom: Animalia
- Phylum: Mollusca
- Class: Gastropoda
- Subclass: Caenogastropoda
- Order: Littorinimorpha
- Family: Hydrobiidae
- Genus: Pyrgulopsis
- Species: P. pecosensis

Binomial name
- Pyrgulopsis pecosensis Taylor, 1987

Species of gastropod

The Pecos springsnail, scientific name Pyrgulopsis pecosensis, is a species of gastropod in the family Hydrobiidae, the mud snails. It is endemic to the United States.
