= Three Forks, Arizona =

Location in Apache County, Arizona

Coordinates: 33°51′17″N 109°18′51″W

Three Forks is a location in Apache County, Arizona where three forks of the Black River converge. It has an estimated elevation of 8,225 feet (2,507 m) above sea level.

The Three Forks springsnail is found exclusively there. The species is endangered and the Three Forks area has consequently been declared a critical habitat.

A Civilian Conservation Corps camp was established at Three Forks in 1932.
