= San Bernardino springsnail =

Conservation status
- Endangered (IUCN 3.1)

- Threatened (ESA)

Scientific classification
- Kingdom: Animalia
- Phylum: Mollusca
- Class: Gastropoda
- Subclass: Caenogastropoda
- Order: Littorinimorpha
- Family: Hydrobiidae
- Genus: Pyrgulopsis
- Species: P. bernardina

Binomial name
- Pyrgulopsis bernardina Taylor, 1987

Species of gastropod

The San Bernardino springsnail (Pyrgulopsis bernardina) is an endangered species of freshwater snail in the family Hydrobiidae. This species is endemic to a small number of springs in the USA and northern Mexico.

== Distribution and habitat ==
The species relies on freshwater springs and has also been collected from a springfed brook. It appears to have formerly occurred in at least eight locations on the headwaters of the Rio Yaqui: in Tule Spring in the San Bernardino National Wildlife Refuge in southeast Arizona, five springs on the John Slaughter Ranch, and two springs in Sonora, Mexico. As of 2012, its presence was only confirmed in one spring on the Slaughter Ranch and the two Sonora locations. Total area of occupancy is thus likely less than 10 km^{2}.

== Description ==
Pyrgulopsis bernardina is a small snail that has a height of 1.3–1.7 millimetres (0.051–0.067 in) and a narrowly conic, small shell. Its differentiated from other Pyrgulopsis in that its penial filament has an absent lobe and elongate filament with the penial ornament consisting of centrally positioned dorsal and ventral glands.

== Ecology ==
The San Bernardino springsnail is aquatic, breathing through gills. It feeds on diatoms and possibly bacterial films and detritus. It probably prefers sand or cobble substrates to silt and organic deposits. Like many similar molluscs, the species is preyed upon by a variety of birds, amphibians and fishes.

== Conservation ==
The San Bernardino springsnail is classified as Endangered by the IUCN because of its extremely limited distribution and rapid loss of habitat sites. Totalp population estimates are uncertain as numbers can vary hugely over short distances (from zero to hundreds of thousands). The species appears to have suffered a range reduction of at least 75%, presumably driven by groundwater depletion and possibly pesticide contamination. The invasive mosquitofish is known to feed on snails in this genus, and while not found to occur in the currently known locations, it has in the past been reported from some of the springs were the snail is now absent.
