= Pyrgulopsis blainica =

Conservation status
- Critically Imperiled (NatureServe)

Scientific classification
- Kingdom: Animalia
- Phylum: Mollusca
- Class: Gastropoda
- Subclass: Caenogastropoda
- Order: Littorinimorpha
- Family: Hydrobiidae
- Genus: Pyrgulopsis
- Species: P. blainica

Binomial name
- Pyrgulopsis blainica Hershler, Liu & Gustafson, 2008

Species of gastropod

Pyrgulopsis blainica, is a species of small freshwater snails with an operculum, aquatic gastropod molluscs or micromolluscs in the family Hydrobiidae.

This species is endemic to Blaine Spring near Varney, Montana, United States. Its natural habitat is springs.

== Description ==
Pyrgulopsis blainica is a small snail that has a height of 3.3–4.6 millimetres (0.13–0.18 in) and ovate conical shell of dark brown coloration. Its differentiated from other Pyrgulopsis in that its penial filament has a small lobe and large filament with the penial ornament consisting of a small terminal gland, a gland along the outer edge of the penial lobe and a ventral gland.
