= Bruneau hot springsnail =

Conservation status
- Critically Endangered (IUCN 3.1)

- Endangered (ESA)

Scientific classification
- Kingdom: Animalia
- Phylum: Mollusca
- Class: Gastropoda
- Subclass: Caenogastropoda
- Order: Littorinimorpha
- Family: Hydrobiidae
- Genus: Pyrgulopsis
- Species: P. bruneauensis

Binomial name
- Pyrgulopsis bruneauensis Hershler, 1990

Species of gastropod

The Bruneau hot springsnail, scientific name Pyrgulopsis bruneauensis, is a species of very small freshwater snail that has a gill and an operculum, an aquatic gastropod mollusk in the family Hydrobiidae. This species is endemic to the United States, Bruneau River in Idaho. Its natural habitat is thermal springs. It is threatened by habitat loss.

== Description ==
Pyrgulopsis bruneauensis is a small snail that has a height of 2.2–2.9 millimetres (0.087–0.114 in) and a globose to broadly conical, medium-sized shell. Its differentiated from other Pyrgulopsis in that its penial filament has a very short lobe and elongate filament with the penial ornament consisting of small, weakly developed terminal gland.

== Distribution ==
It is only found in geothermal springs and seeps along an 8 kilometres (5.0 mi) length of the Bruneau River in Southwest Idaho.

== Habitat ==
It prefers wetted rock faces of springs and flowing water, with large cobbles and boulders. The principal threat to the Bruneau hot springsnail is the reduction and/or elimination of its geothermal habitats as a result of groundwater withdrawal, primarily for agriculture. Spring temperatures are the predominant factor that determines the springsnail's distribution and abundance; the springsnail requires constant springwater temperatures to survive.

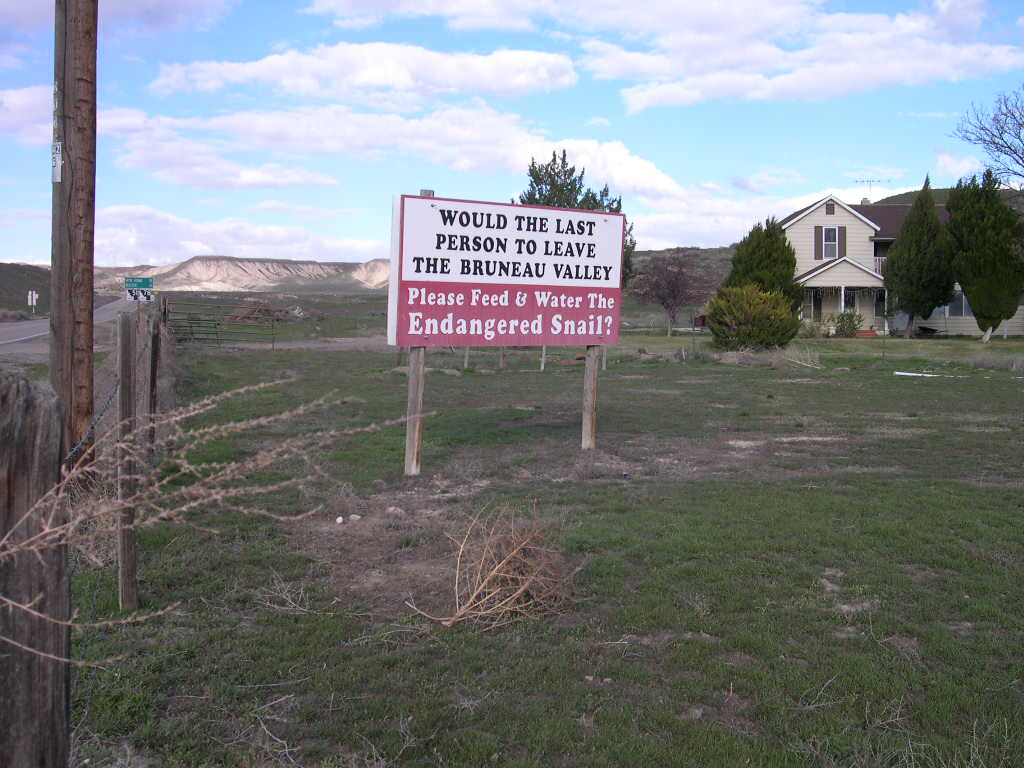
Bruneau Idaho Snail Sign- placed there after the world's rarest snails were discovered in hotsprings in the area, and ranchers believed they were protecting the snails (Pyrgulopsis bruneauensis) more than the people living there

== Conservation ==
The U.S. Fish and Wildlife Service's 5-year Review for the Bruneau hot springsnail in 2007 concluded that the original listing classification as endangered remains unchanged. The threats that were present at the time of the springsnail's listing remain today. In particular, groundwater levels are not stable or increasing and there is a decline in the number of geothermal springs occupied by the springsnail. Bruneau hot springsnail populations show declining trends, and connectivity between the remaining colonies has been reduced. Current conservation measures are falling short of addressing the highest-ranking threats to the species. Despite previous conservation efforts, threats to the Bruneau hot springsnail persist and it is in danger of extinction. However, on January 14, 2019, Idaho lawmakers advanced plans to cap hundreds of artesian wells in the area, improving geothermal aquifer pressure. The U.S. Fish and Wildlife Service is working with the State of Idaho and other partners in conservation, including private landowners, toward the shared goal of reducing threats and ultimately recovering this species so that it no longer needs protection under the ESA. Conservation actions include efforts to increase and stabilize geothermal water levels. These actions might include: voluntary conservation easements (lease/purchase water rights), irrigation system improvements to reduce agricultural water use, continued monitoring of water levels and snail distribution, control of non-native fish known to prey upon the springsnail, and establishment of regulatory measures that are adequate to permanently protect the springsnail from future groundwater reductions.
