= Verde Rim springsnail =

Verde rim springsnail

Conservation status
- Vulnerable (IUCN 3.1)

- Critically Imperiled (NatureServe)

Scientific classification
- Kingdom: Animalia
- Phylum: Mollusca
- Class: Gastropoda
- Subclass: Caenogastropoda
- Order: Littorinimorpha
- Family: Hydrobiidae
- Genus: Pyrgulopsis
- Species: P. glandulosa

Binomial name
- Pyrgulopsis glandulosa Hershler, 1988

Species of gastropod

The Verde Rim springsnail, scientific name Pyrgulopsis glandulosa, is a species of small freshwater snail, an aquatic gastropod mollusk in the family Hydrobiidae. This species is endemic to the United States. The common name refers to the Verde River in Arizona.
