= Marstonia agarhecta =

Conservation status
- Endangered (IUCN 2.3)

- Critically Imperiled (NatureServe)

Scientific classification
- Kingdom: Animalia
- Phylum: Mollusca
- Class: Gastropoda
- Subclass: Caenogastropoda
- Order: Littorinimorpha
- Family: Hydrobiidae
- Genus: Marstonia
- Species: M. agarhecta

Binomial name
- Marstonia agarhecta (F. G. Thompson, 1969)

Synonyms
- Pyrgulopsis agarhecta F. G. Thompson, 1969

Species of gastropod

Marstonia agarhecta, common name Ocmulgee marstonia, is a species of freshwater snail with a gill and an operculum, aquatic gastropod mollusk in the family Hydrobiidae.

This species is endemic to Georgia, the United States. Its natural habitat is rivers. It is threatened by habitat loss.
