= Huachuca springsnail =

Conservation status
- Near Threatened (IUCN 3.1)

- Imperiled (NatureServe)

Scientific classification
- Kingdom: Animalia
- Phylum: Mollusca
- Class: Gastropoda
- Subclass: Caenogastropoda
- Order: Littorinimorpha
- Family: Hydrobiidae
- Genus: Pyrgulopsis
- Species: P. thompsoni

Binomial name
- Pyrgulopsis thompsoni Hershler, 1988

Species of gastropod

The Huachuca springsnail scientific name Pyrgulopsis thompsoni, is a species of very small freshwater snail with an operculum, an aquatic gastropod mollusk in the family Hydrobiidae.

This species is endemic to the United States and Mexico. Its natural habitat is freshwater springs. It is threatened by habitat loss.
