= Fairbanks springsnail =

Conservation status
- Data Deficient (IUCN 3.1)

- Critically Imperiled (NatureServe)

Scientific classification
- Kingdom: Animalia
- Phylum: Mollusca
- Class: Gastropoda
- Subclass: Caenogastropoda
- Order: Littorinimorpha
- Family: Hydrobiidae
- Genus: Pyrgulopsis
- Species: P. fairbanksensis

Binomial name
- Pyrgulopsis fairbanksensis Hershler & Sada, 1987

Species of gastropod

The Fairbanks springsnail, scientific name Pyrgulopsis fairbanksensis, is a species of small freshwater snails with an operculum, aquatic gastropod molluscs or micromolluscs in the family Hydrobiidae.

This species' natural habitat is springs. It is endemic to Fairbanks Spring, Ash Meadows, Nevada, United States.

== Description ==
Pyrgulopsis fairbanksensis is a small snail that has a height of 2.5–3.4 millimetres (0.098–0.134 in) and a globose-turbinate, medium-sized shell. Its differentiated from other Pyrgulopsis in that its penial filament has a short lobe and elongate filament with the penial ornament consisting of small, circular terminal gland.
