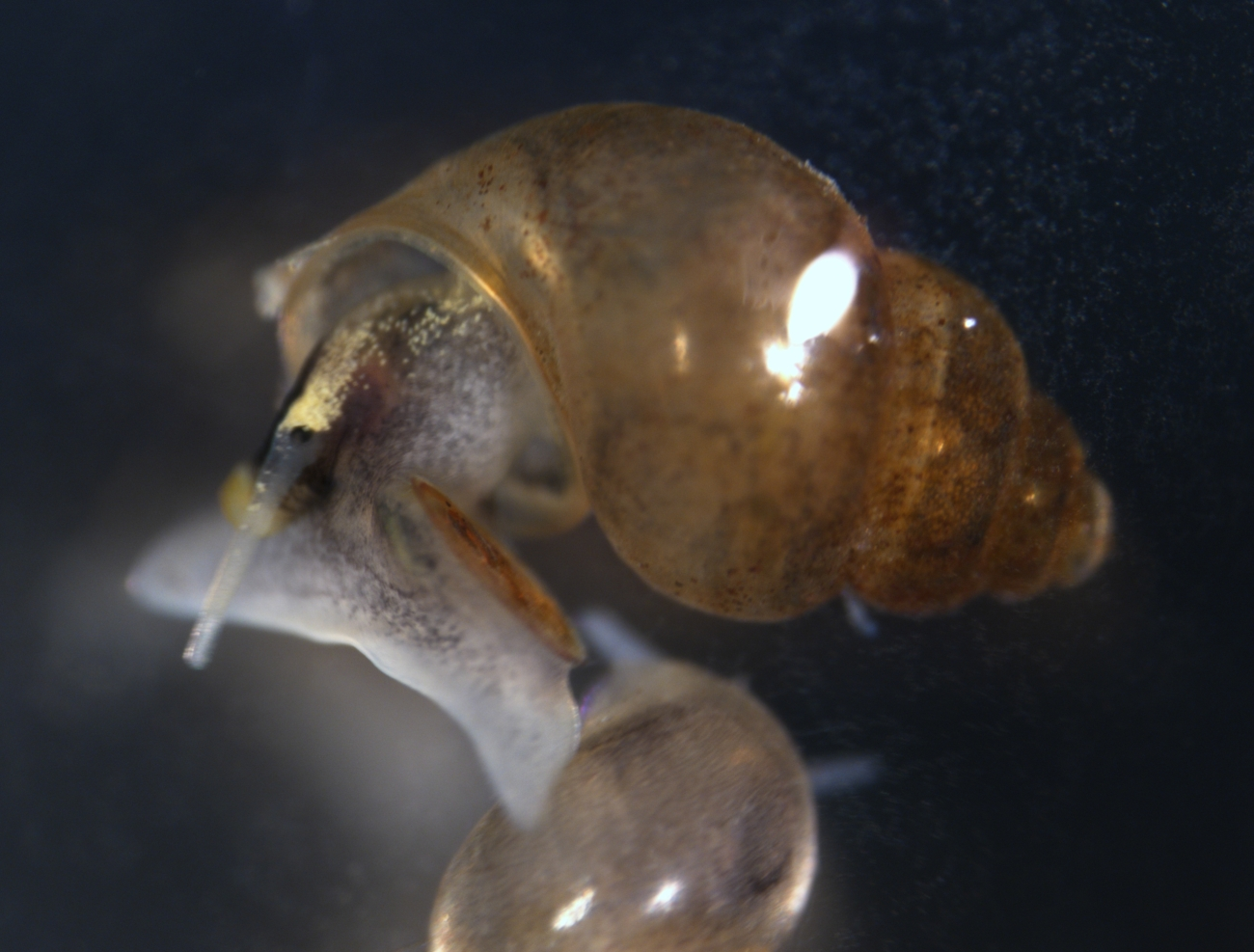
- Macro image of a Roswell springsnail, about 1.5mm in length

Conservation status
- Vulnerable (IUCN 3.1)

- Endangered (ESA)

Scientific classification
- Kingdom: Animalia
- Phylum: Mollusca
- Class: Gastropoda
- Subclass: Caenogastropoda
- Order: Littorinimorpha
- Family: Hydrobiidae
- Genus: Pyrgulopsis
- Species: P. roswellensis

Binomial name
- Pyrgulopsis roswellensis Taylor, 1987

= Roswell springsnail =

Species of gastropod

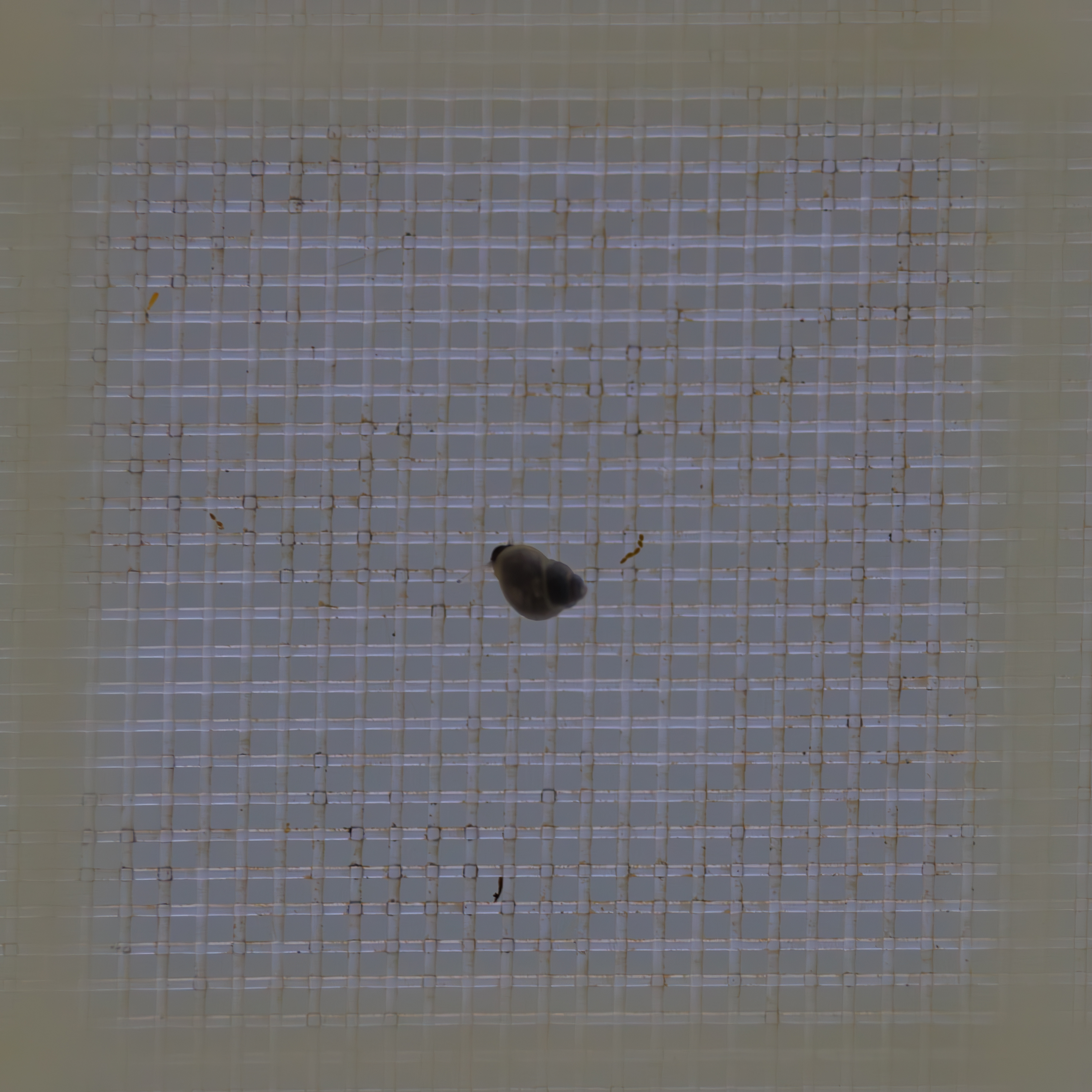

The Roswell springsnail, scientific name Pyrgulopsis roswellensis, is a species of small freshwater snail, an aquatic gastropod mollusc in the family Hydrobiidae. This species is endemic to Roswell, New Mexico in the United States.
