= Page springsnail =

Conservation status
- Data Deficient (IUCN 2.3)

- Critically Imperiled (NatureServe)

Scientific classification
- Kingdom: Animalia
- Phylum: Mollusca
- Class: Gastropoda
- Subclass: Caenogastropoda
- Order: Littorinimorpha
- Family: Hydrobiidae
- Genus: Pyrgulopsis
- Species: P. morrisoni

Binomial name
- Pyrgulopsis morrisoni Hershler, 1988

Species of gastropod

The Page springsnail (Pyrgulopsis morrisoni) is a species of freshwater snail in the family Hydrobiidae, the mud snails. It is endemic to Arizona in the United States, where it is known only from the Upper Verde River drainage in Yavapai County.

This snail has an ovate to conical shell no more than 2.9 millimeters tall. The species is sexually dimorphic, with females generally larger than males.

This aquatic snail lives in a system of springs along a tributary of the Upper Verde River known as the Oak Creek Springs Complex. Many of the waterways in the area are known locally as cienegas. The snail occurs most often in waters with substrates of gravel and pebbles. It is most common around spring vents and in shallower parts of the springs.

The entire population of this snail occurs within a two-mile radius. It is known from six sites, a seventh having been recently extirpated. Loss of habitat occurred when a local fish hatchery was renovated and when ditches were dug nearby, changing water flow rates. Habitat degradation is an ongoing threat to all six remaining sites. The snail may also be threatened by the introduction of the predatory mosquitofish (Gambusia affinis).
