= Elongate-gland springsnail =

Conservation status
- Data Deficient (IUCN 2.3)

- Presumed Extinct (NatureServe)

Scientific classification
- Kingdom: Animalia
- Phylum: Mollusca
- Class: Gastropoda
- Subclass: Caenogastropoda
- Order: Littorinimorpha
- Family: Hydrobiidae
- Genus: Pyrgulopsis
- Species: P. isolata

Binomial name
- Pyrgulopsis isolata Hershler & Sada, 1987

Species of gastropod

The elongate-gland springsnail, scientific name Pyrgulopsis isolata, is a species of small freshwater snails with an operculum, aquatic gastropod molluscs or micromolluscs in the family Hydrobiidae. This species is endemic to the United States.
