= Three Forks springsnail =

Conservation status
- Critically Endangered (IUCN 3.1)

- Endangered (ESA)

Scientific classification
- Kingdom: Animalia
- Phylum: Mollusca
- Class: Gastropoda
- Subclass: Caenogastropoda
- Order: Littorinimorpha
- Family: Hydrobiidae
- Genus: Pyrgulopsis
- Species: P. trivialis

Binomial name
- Pyrgulopsis trivialis (Taylor, 1987)

Species of gastropod

The Three Forks springsnail, scientific name Pyrgulopsis trivialis, is a species of very small freshwater snail with a gill and an operculum, an aquatic gastropod mollusk in the family Hydrobiidae. This species is endemic to the United States. The common name is a reference to its endemic range at Three Forks, Arizona.
