= Montezuma Well springsnail =

Conservation status
- Vulnerable (IUCN 3.1)

- Critically Imperiled (NatureServe)

Scientific classification
- Kingdom: Animalia
- Phylum: Mollusca
- Class: Gastropoda
- Subclass: Caenogastropoda
- Order: Littorinimorpha
- Family: Hydrobiidae
- Genus: Pyrgulopsis
- Species: P. montezumensis

Binomial name
- Pyrgulopsis montezumensis Hershler, 1988

Species of gastropod

The Montezuma Well springsnail (Pyrgulopsis montezumensis) is a species of freshwater snail in the family Hydrobiidae, the mud snails. It is endemic to Montezuma Well, a large sinkhole in Yavapai County, Arizona, in the United States.

This snail has an ovate shell measuring no more than 2.7 millimeters tall. The tip of the snout is pigmented. The species is sexually dimorphic.

This aquatic snail lives in springs with substrates of travertine limestone. It is limited to Montezuma Well and the first 100 meters of its outflow. The snail has a preference for areas of the spring with bare limestone and no vegetation or sediment. It tolerates relatively high amounts of dissolved carbon dioxide and remains in areas of the springs where the CO_{2} concentration is high, possibly as a means of avoiding predators that cannot tolerate these conditions.
