= Brown springsnail =

Conservation status
- Data Deficient (IUCN 2.3)

- Critically Imperiled (NatureServe)

Scientific classification
- Kingdom: Animalia
- Phylum: Mollusca
- Class: Gastropoda
- Subclass: Caenogastropoda
- Order: Littorinimorpha
- Family: Hydrobiidae
- Genus: Pyrgulopsis
- Species: P. sola

Binomial name
- Pyrgulopsis sola Hershler, 1988

Species of gastropod

The brown springsnail, scientific name Pyrgulopsis sola, is a species of very small freshwater snail that has a gill and an operculum, an aquatic gastropod mollusk in the family Hydrobiidae. This species is endemic to Arizona, the United States.
