= Distal-gland springsnail =

Conservation status
- Data Deficient (IUCN 2.3)

- Critically Imperiled (NatureServe)

Scientific classification
- Kingdom: Animalia
- Phylum: Mollusca
- Class: Gastropoda
- Subclass: Caenogastropoda
- Order: Littorinimorpha
- Family: Hydrobiidae
- Genus: Pyrgulopsis
- Species: P. nanus

Binomial name
- Pyrgulopsis nanus Hershler & Sada, 1987

Species of gastropod

The distal-gland springsnail, scientific name Pyrgulopsis nanus, is a species of freshwater snails with a gill and an operculum, aquatic gastropod mollusks in the family Hydrobiidae. This species is endemic to the United States.
