= Crystal Spring springsnail =

Crystal spring springsnail

Conservation status
- Data Deficient (IUCN 2.3)

- Critically Imperiled (NatureServe)

Scientific classification
- Kingdom: Animalia
- Phylum: Mollusca
- Class: Gastropoda
- Subclass: Caenogastropoda
- Order: Littorinimorpha
- Family: Hydrobiidae
- Genus: Pyrgulopsis
- Species: P. crystalis

Binomial name
- Pyrgulopsis crystalis Hershler & Sada, 1987

Species of gastropod

The Crystal Spring springsnail, scientific name Pyrgulopsis crystalis, is a species of small freshwater snail, an aquatic gastropod mollusk in the family Hydrobiidae.

This species' natural habitat is springs. It is endemic to Crystal Pool, Ash Meadows, Nevada, United States.

== Description ==
Pyrgulopsis crystalis is a small snail that has a height of 1.8–2.6 millimetres (0.071–0.102 in) and a globose to neritiform, small to medium-sized shell. Its differentiated from other Pyrgulopsis in that its penial filament has an absent lobe and elongate filament with the penial ornament consisting of a large, superficial ventral gland.
