= Gila springsnail =

Conservation status
- Vulnerable (IUCN 2.3)

Scientific classification
- Kingdom: Animalia
- Phylum: Mollusca
- Class: Gastropoda
- Subclass: Caenogastropoda
- Order: Littorinimorpha
- Family: Hydrobiidae
- Genus: Pyrgulopsis
- Species: P. gilae

Binomial name
- Pyrgulopsis gilae (Taylor, 1987)

Species of gastropod

The Gila springsnail, scientific name Pyrgulopsis gilae, is a species of freshwater snail with an operculum, an aquatic gastropod mollusk in the family Hydrobiidae.

This species is endemic to springs on the East Fork of the Gila River, New Mexico, United States. Its natural habitat is springs. It is threatened by habitat loss.

== Description ==
Pyrgulopsis gilae is a small snail that has a height of 3.1–4.0 millimetres (0.12–0.16 in) and an ovate-conic, medium to large-sized shell. Its differentiated from other Pyrgulopsis in that its penial filament has a medium-length lobe and medium-length filament with the penial ornament consisting of two elongate penial glands, several other small dorsal glands; and curved, transverse terminal and ventral gland.
