= Grand Wash springsnail =

Conservation status
- Vulnerable (IUCN 2.3)

- Imperiled (NatureServe)

Scientific classification
- Kingdom: Animalia
- Phylum: Mollusca
- Class: Gastropoda
- Subclass: Caenogastropoda
- Order: Littorinimorpha
- Family: Hydrobiidae
- Genus: Pyrgulopsis
- Species: P. bacchus

Binomial name
- Pyrgulopsis bacchus Hershler, 1988

Species of mollusc

The Grand Wash springsnail (Pyrgulopsis bacchus) is a species of freshwater snail in the family Hydrobiidae, the mud snails. It is endemic to Mohave County, Arizona, in the United States.

The snail is known only from Grand Wash, a watershed near Lake Mead. Shells that may belong to this species have also been collected in southern Nevada. The snail occurs in a few springs in its range, where it feeds on algae and detritus. Though very limited in distribution, it can be abundant in its native springs, with up to 50 individuals congregating on a single leaf in the water.

== Description ==
Pyrgulopsis bacchus is a small snail that has a height of 2.3–3.1 millimetres (0.091–0.122 in) and an ovate-conic, medium-sized shell. Its differentiated from other Pyrgulopsis in that its penial filament has a short lobe and medium length filament with the penial ornament consisting of a transverse, often fragmented terminal gland.
