= South Sierra Nevada springsnail =

Conservation status
- Vulnerable (IUCN 2.3)

- Critically Imperiled (NatureServe)

Scientific classification
- Kingdom: Animalia
- Phylum: Mollusca
- Class: Gastropoda
- Subclass: Caenogastropoda
- Order: Littorinimorpha
- Family: Hydrobiidae
- Genus: Pyrgulopsis
- Species: P. giuliani

Binomial name
- Pyrgulopsis giuliani Hershler & Pratt, 1990

Species of freshwater snail

The South Sierra Nevada springsnail, scientific name Pyrgulopsis giuliani, is a species of very small freshwater snail with an operculum, an aquatic gastropod mollusk in the family Hydrobiidae.

This species is endemic to the Sierra Nevada in the United States. This species is threatened by habitat loss.
