= Jackson lake springsnail =

Conservation status
- Least Concern (IUCN 3.1)

- Secure (NatureServe)

Scientific classification
- Kingdom: Animalia
- Phylum: Mollusca
- Class: Gastropoda
- Subclass: Caenogastropoda
- Order: Littorinimorpha
- Family: Hydrobiidae
- Genus: Pyrgulopsis
- Species: P. robusta

Binomial name
- Pyrgulopsis robusta (Walker, 1908)

Synonyms
- Pomatiopis robusta Walker, 1908; Amnicola robusta Pilsbry, 1933; Amnicola hendersoni Pilsbry, 1933; Amnicola idahoensis Pilsbry, 1933; Fontelicella (Natricola) robusta Gregg & Taylor, 1965; Fontelicella (Natricola) hendersoni Gregg & Taylor, 1965; Fontelicella (Natricola) idahoensis Gregg & Taylor, 1965; Pyrgulopsis hendersoni Hershler & Thompson, 1987; Pyrgulopsis idahoensis Hershler & Thompson, 1987

Species of gastropod

The Jackson lake springsnail, scientific name Pyrgulopsis robusta, is a species of very small or minute freshwater snail with an operculum, an aquatic gastropod mollusk in the family Hydrobiidae. This species is endemic to the United States. The shell is 4.6 to 7.5 millimetres (0.18 to 0.30 in) high and 1.48 to 2.10 millimetres (0.058 to 0.083 in) wide, which is large for this genus. It has 4.5 to 6.25 whorls, and is clear-white with a tan periostracum.

== Taxonomy ==
In 2004, two species (P. idahoensis and P. hendersoni) were reclassified as P. robusta based on genetic analysis. The species description was amended to capture a broader range in morphology.
