= Median-gland Nevada springsnail =

Median-gland nevada springsnail

Conservation status
- Data Deficient (IUCN 2.3)

Scientific classification
- Kingdom: Animalia
- Phylum: Mollusca
- Class: Gastropoda
- Subclass: Caenogastropoda
- Order: Littorinimorpha
- Family: Hydrobiidae
- Genus: Pyrgulopsis
- Species: P. pisteri

Binomial name
- Pyrgulopsis pisteri Hershler & Sada, 1987

Species of gastropod

The median-gland Nevada springsnail, scientific name Pyrgulopsis pisteri, is a species of freshwater snails with a gill and an operculum, aquatic gastropod mollusks in the family Hydrobiidae.

This species is endemic to Nevada, United States.
