= Corneous =

Made out of a substance similar to hooves or horns

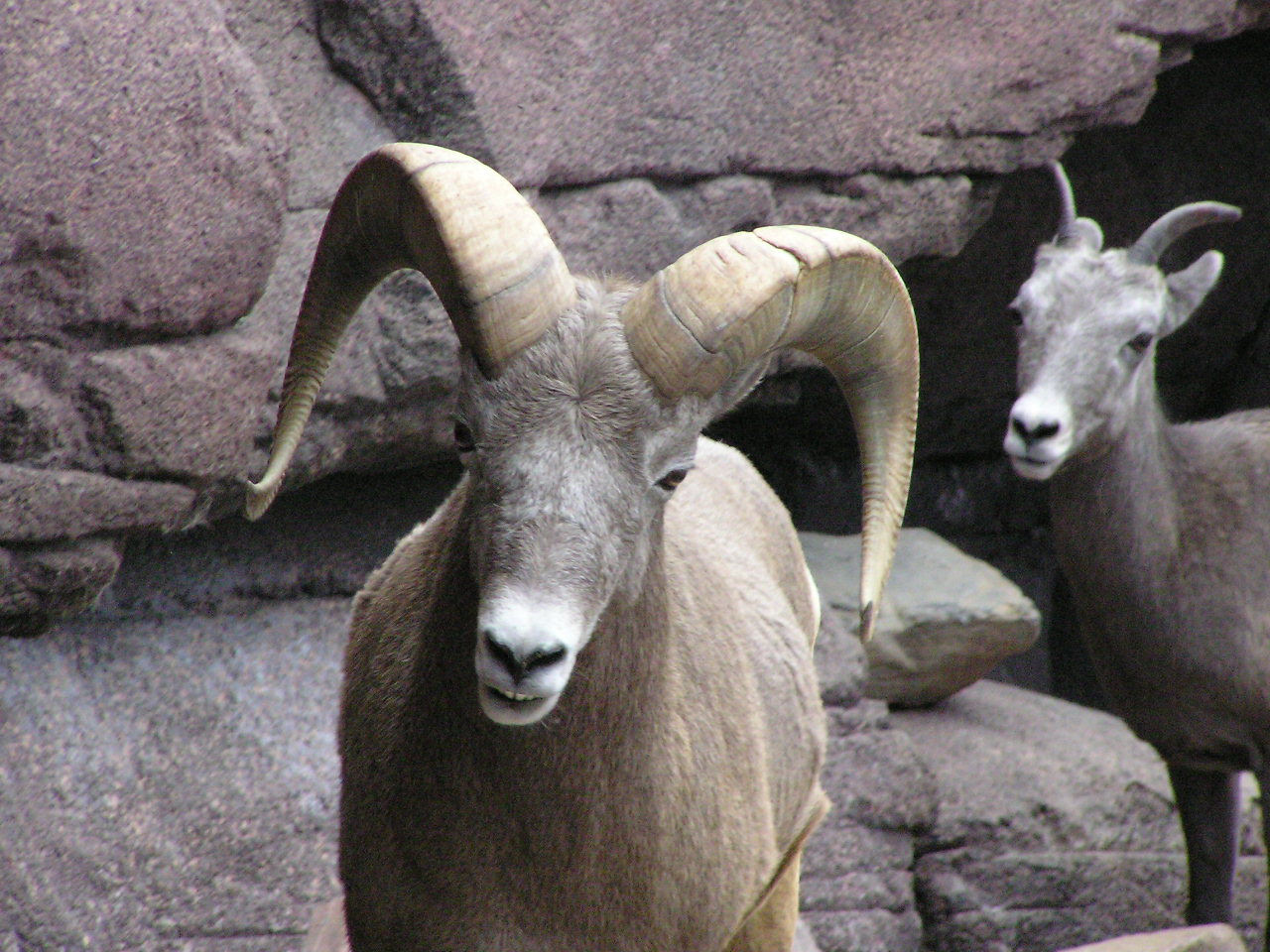
This goat has corneous horns.

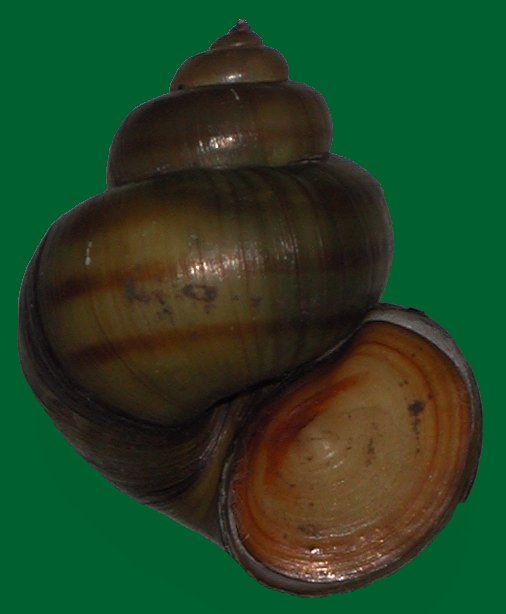
Gastropod shell of Viviparus contectus with its corneous operculum in place

Corneous is a biological and medical term meaning horny, in other words made out of a substance similar to that of horns and hooves in some mammals.

The word is generally used to describe natural or pathological anatomical structures made out of a hard layer of protein. In mammals this protein would usually be keratin.

The word corneous is also often used to describe the operculum of a snail, a gastropod mollusc. Not all gastropods have opercula, but in the great majority of those that do have one, the operculum is corneous. (However in several genera within a few families including the marine Naticidae and the terrestrial Pomatiidae, the operculum is primarily calcareous, in other words mostly made of calcium carbonate.) Corneous opercula are made out of the protein conchiolin.
