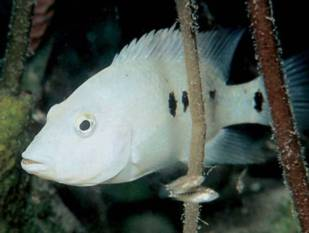
- Female Minckley's cichlid in breeding coloration.

Conservation status
- Endangered (IUCN 3.1)

Scientific classification
- Kingdom: Animalia
- Phylum: Chordata
- Class: Actinopterygii
- Division: Teleostei
- Order: Cichliformes
- Family: Cichlidae
- Genus: Herichthys
- Species: H. minckleyi

Binomial name
- Herichthys minckleyi (Kornfield & Taylor, 1983)

Synonyms
- Cichlasoma minckleyi Kornfield & Taylor, 1983

= Minckley's cichlid =

Species of fish

The Minckley's cichlid (Herichthys minckleyi) is a polymorphic species of fish in the family Cichlidae.

== Description ==
The Minckley’s cichlid typically ranges from 70–92 mm in length, with either a deep or slender body. The color ranges from tan, light grey, yellowish green, dark green to dark brown or black, with four to seven bars on the posterior middle side of the fish. These bars usually lie on top of some faint cross-hatching. When the fish are subadults, a spot may be present on the rear portion of the fish, but this characteristic is lost as the fish reaches adulthood. Adults may also develop black speckling on the body and light speckling on the fins. There are two lateral lines on the fish, an upper and a lower line, with the aforementioned four to seven bars centering between them. Appearance of the fish can change within seconds during aggressive, competitive, or mating behaviors. H. minckleyi have rounded tails as well as pectoral fins, with a slender caudal peduncle connecting the tail to the body of the fish.

To identify the Herichthys genus, one can observe the six to seven vertical bars on the posterior middle side of the fish. During breeding season, the coloration of the fish changes to prepare for reproduction, exhibiting sexual dichromatism with this new breeding look. H. minckleyi is distinguished from other species in the group by its longer head, longer snout, and shorter dorsal and anal fins. It can be identified by sixteen spines and eleven rays on the dorsal fin, with five spines on the anal fin.

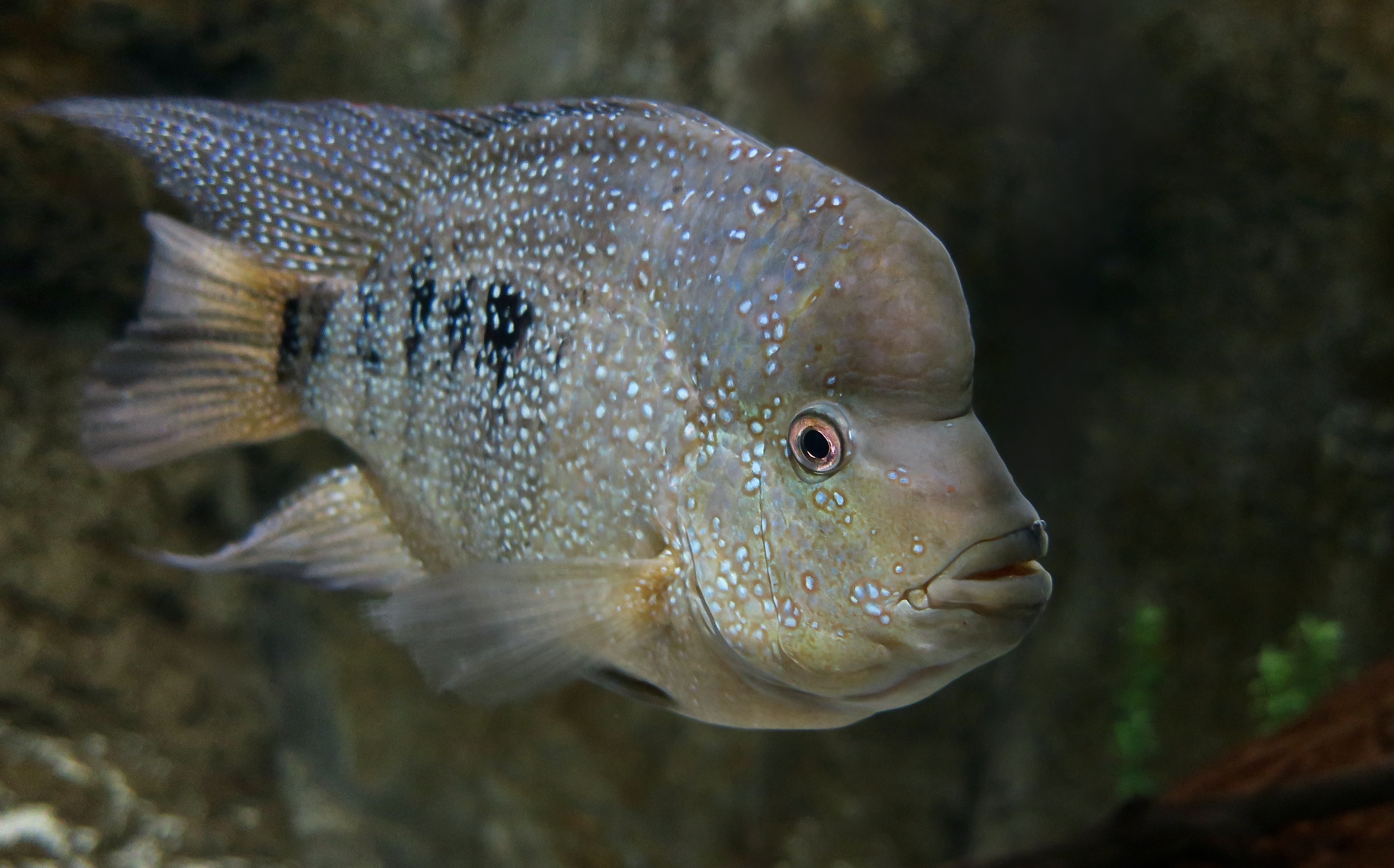
A Minckley's cichlid at OdySea Aquarium.

== Taxonomy and Nomenclature ==
A chordate animal, H. minckleyi is part of the Kingdom Animalia and the Phylum Chordates. As a ray-finned fish, it is a member of the class Actinopterygii. It belongs to the family Cichlidae and is one of ten species in the genus Herichthys.

Originally classified as Cichlasoma minckleyi, it was renamed to Herichthys minckleyi. Other names include the Cuatro Ciénegas cichlid. The name honors the ichthyologist Wendell L. Minckley (1935-2001) of Arizona State University, who studied the ecology of Cuatro Ciénegas.

The family Cichlidae is incredibly species-rich, with over 1,300 extant distinct species. The oldest Cichlid fossil dates back to the Eocene epoch, 54-38 million years ago. These brackish to freshwater fish are widely distributed across the globe, with representation in South/Central America, Africa, Madagascar, the Middle East, the Caribbean, Europe, and India. There is quite a bit of debate regarding the biogeographical history of this family, with multiple proposed theories.

The genus Herichthys is considered a monophyletic (meaning all from the same ancestor species) group encompassing all of the Cichlids (of family Cichlidae) in southern Texas and northeastern Mexico.

== Distribution ==
Map pinpointing the Cuatro Ciénegas region in the Mexican state of Coahuila.

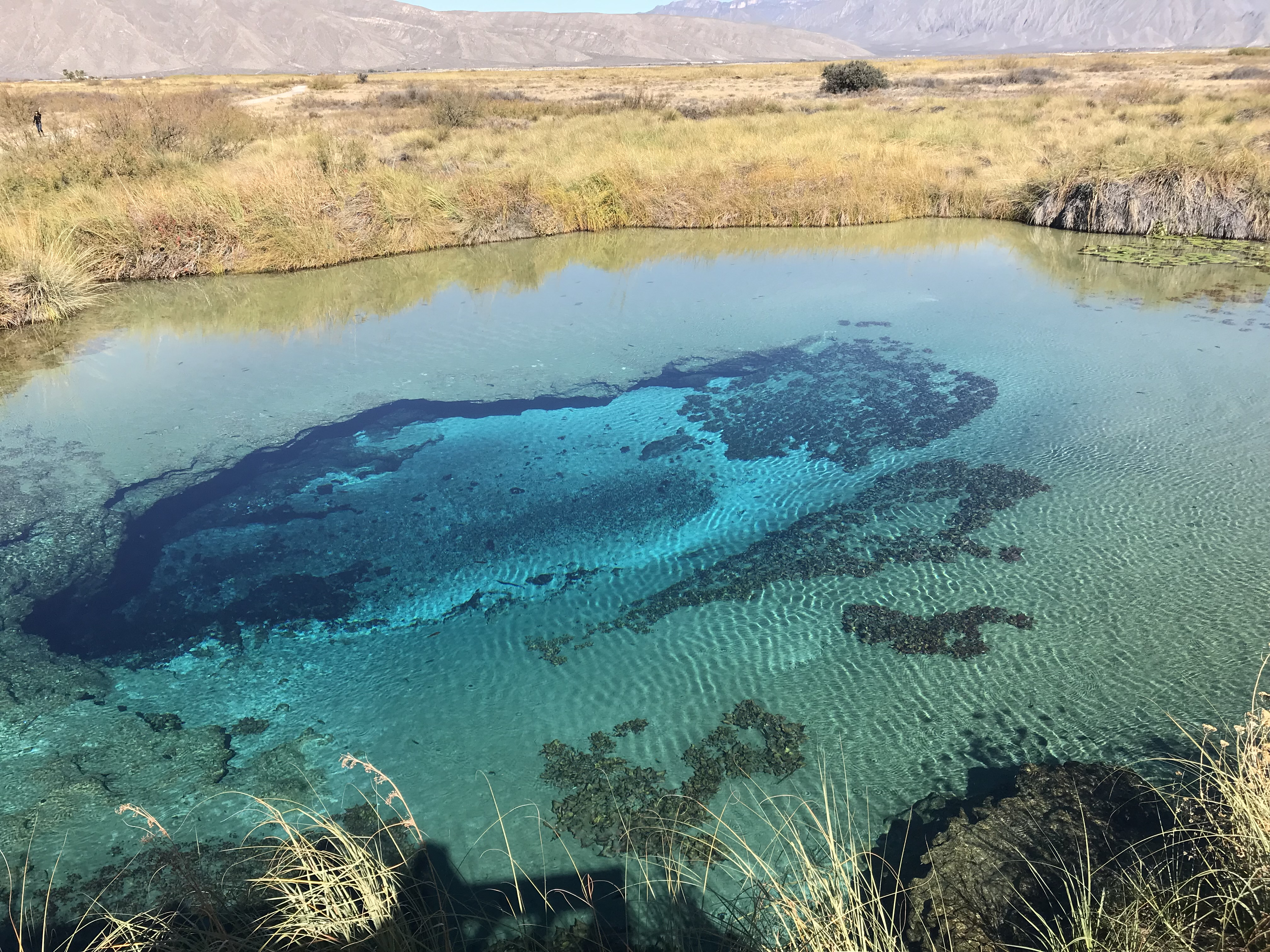
Poza Azul, a poza in the Cuatro Ciénegas protected wetland area.

First catalogued by researchers Irv Kornfield and Jeffery Taylor in 1983, Minckley’s cichlid is endemic to the butterfly-shaped Cuatro Ciénegas Basin in Coahuila, México. Replete with nitrogen and phosphorus-poor spring-fed ecosystems, the basin exhibits high levels of endemism. The basin receives little (<200 mm) of rainfall per year, but the aquatic ecosystems are powered by groundwater. The basin sits 750m above sea level, with the surrounding mountains stretching 2500m above.

The Cuatro Ciénegas Basin is known for its diverse fish fauna, and H. minckleyi makes a contribution. In this intermontane basin, H. minckleyi is found in springs, streams, ponds, and lagunas. H. minckleyi is the northernmost species of the greater H. cyanoguttatus group.

== Life History ==
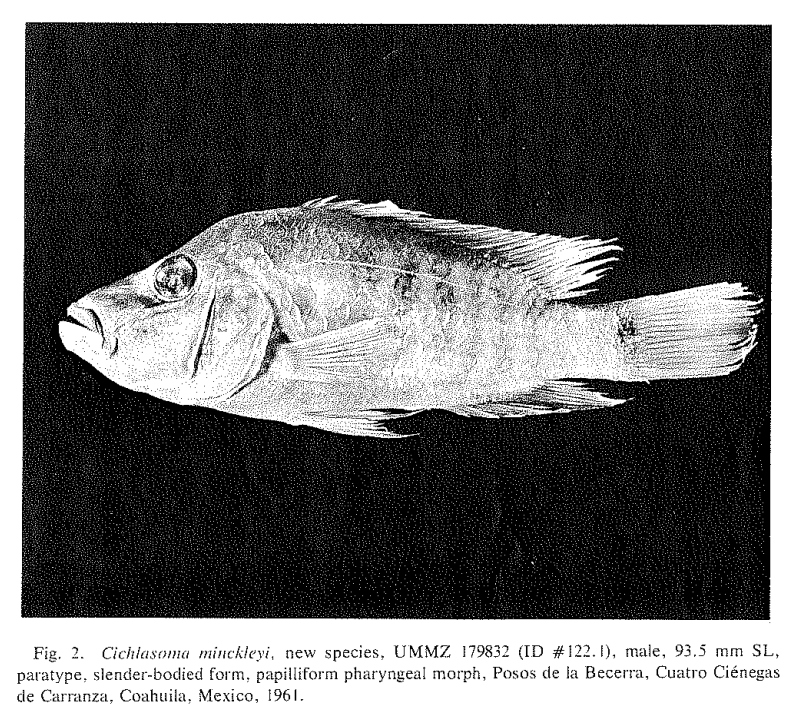
Slender-bodied form of H. minckleyi.

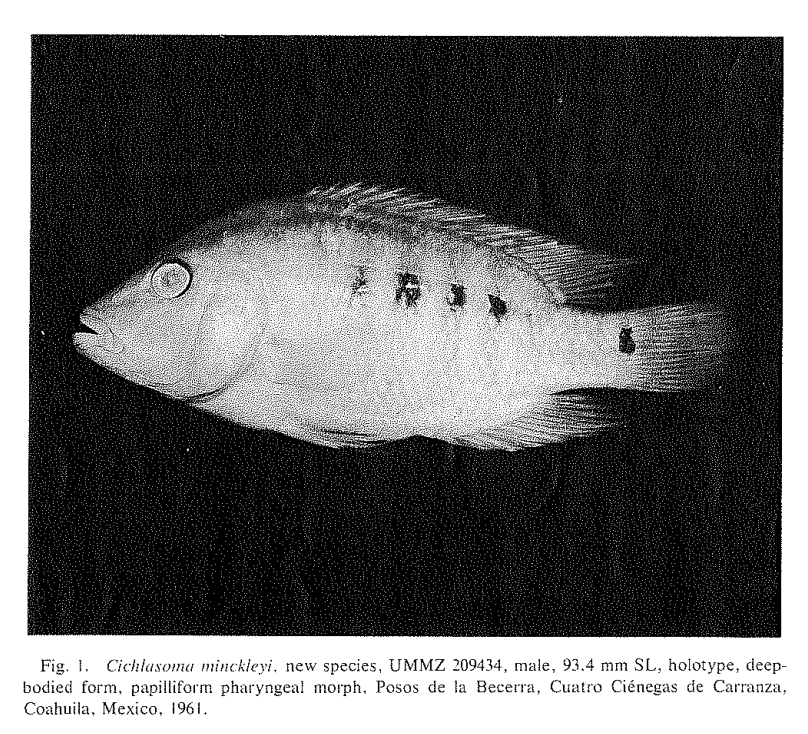
Deep-bodied form of H. minckleyi.

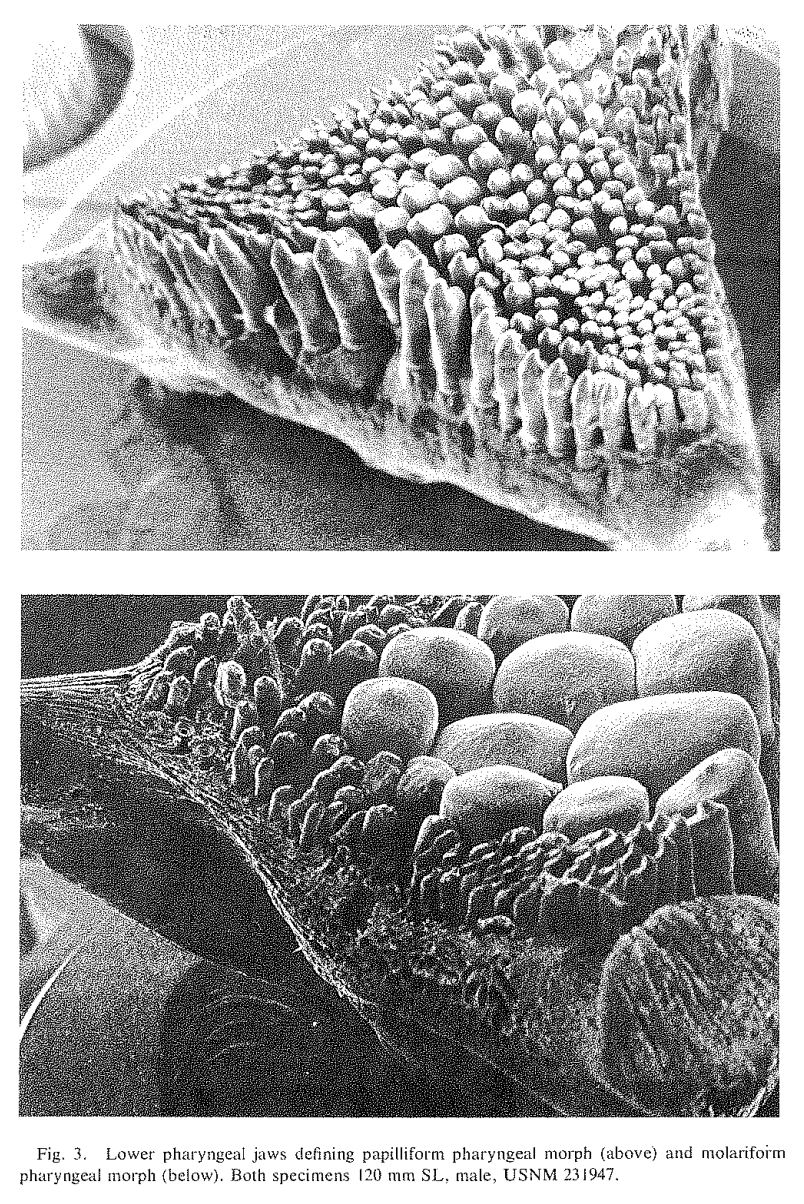
The difference between the papilliform (top) and molariform (bottom) pharyngeal jaw morphs.

H. minckleyi is a unique species because there are two distinct body forms, a deep-bodied form and a slender-bodied form. The slender-bodied forms typically have a longer gut and consume smaller fish. The deep-bodied form, in comparison, has a shorter gut and consumes gastropods. This fish is also known for its two distinct trophic morphs—individuals' dentition will vary within the same species based on their feeding habits, regardless of body form. These two forms are the “small tooth” form and the “large tooth” form. The “small tooth” form has papilliform pharyngeal teeth, meaning that the teeth present on an arch in the throat of the fish are small, sharp, and pencil-like. The “large tooth” form fish have large and flat molariform pharyngeal teeth. Some literature considers there to be a third morph; this form has intermediate pharyngeal dentition between molariform and papilliform. However, this morph makes up less than five percent of the total population. The difference in these forms also serves as an important distinguishing characteristic between H. minckleyi and other members of the Herichthys group.

== Phylogeny ==
The diverging dentition was previously thought to be evidence of two distinct species or hybridization; however, genetic research finds that the morphs are currently still within the same species and do not come from genetically distinct lineages. However, resource polymorphisms can be the initiating step into speciation and population divergence, and the Cuatro Ciénegas region and this species have been compared to the Galápagos Islands and Darwin’s finches.

== Diet ==
The molariform teeth are found to crush snails, while few papilliform fish ingested snails in the wild. Conversely, papilliform fish finely shredded for plant consumption, while molariform fish were unable to do so. On a unique note, the snail crushing muscle power of the molariform H. minckleyi is substantial, even compared with other mollusk eating fish. This could be due to co-evolutionary predator-prey interactions between the durable snails of the Cuatro Ciénegas region and the strong pharyngeal muscles of H. minckleyi.

These two morphs feed in different microhabitats and also exhibit different feeding behaviors. This distinction possibly reduces resource competition within the species. This polymorphism continues in the population, instead of coming together, because of this reduced competition between different morphs, and is thought to be an important first step to speciation. Cichlids in general are known for rapid speciation, hence the interest in such divergent forms while maintaining genetic conspecificity.

== Reproduction and parental care ==
Minckley’s cichlids are the only species in their genus to demonstrate sexual dichromatism, meaning male and female fish exhibit markedly different coloration patterns during mating. Because they are the only species to exhibit this characteristic, the trait evolved after the species evolutionarily diverged from other living Herichthys. Female fish usually change to white with black markings along their sides, while males change to solid dark green or black with pale bluish spots on the fins. Solid black coloration is associated with competitive male behaviors, while lighter colorations are associated with pair-bonding behaviors. However, there are other color variations, and the individuals do not always completely express the breeding coloration; there are many observations of a partial change in coloration.

H. minckleyi are polygynous species; one male will reproduce with multiple females. In addition to this, male fish will guard an area of several square meters with the females inside. When females are brooding, they will become reclusive until their offspring can swim by themselves, at which point the female fish will guard their young.

After initial reproduction occurs, H. minckleyi have been found to take care of their young with a different style than a closely related cichlid species, H. cyanoguttatus. Males stick around females less after mating than the close species, and perform fewer attacks to protect their offspring. Unlike many of the fish’s unique traits, this tendency of male fish to be absent from the nest is an evolved trait from the evolutionary lineage and not a species-specific response to the unique pressures of the Cuatro Ciénegas Basin.

Status

Currently, the Minckley’s cichlid is listed on the IUCN Red List as Endangered, meaning there is a high chance for the extinction of this fish in the wild.

== Conservation ==
As an endangered species, the Minckley’s cichlid is subject to conservation efforts, and informed management is crucial. Endemic species are particularly vulnerable to habitat destruction, adding more conservation challenges. Additionally, because H. minckleyi presents with more than one morph, the fish are distributed across different habitats within the Cuatro Ciénegas basin. The conservation implication of this polymorphism is to protect heterogeneity of substrate conditions so that all morphs may have their necessary habitat.

Currently, the range of this endemic species is under protection from the Mexican federal government, listed as an “Area de Protección de Flora y Fauna,” and managed by the Secretaría del Medio Ambiente y Recursos Naturales. The Cuatro Ciénegas basin is also a conservation site of interest for the World Wildlife Fund, UNESCO, and the Nature Conservancy. Hopefully, the protections afforded to the Basin can contribute to the conservation and recovery of the unique Minckley’s cichlid as well.

== Significance to Humans ==
As an endangered species, the Minckley’s cichlid has attracted researchers worldwide to understanding trophic polymorphism. Additionally, this fish makes a contribution to biodiversity in a unique region.
