= Oasis Valley springsnail =

Oasis valley springsnail

Conservation status
- Least Concern (IUCN 2.3)

- Critically Imperiled (NatureServe)

Scientific classification
- Kingdom: Animalia
- Phylum: Mollusca
- Class: Gastropoda
- Subclass: Caenogastropoda
- Order: Littorinimorpha
- Family: Hydrobiidae
- Genus: Pyrgulopsis
- Species: P. micrococcus

Binomial name
- Pyrgulopsis micrococcus (Pilsbry, 1893)

Synonyms
- Amnicola micrococcus Pilsbry, 1893; Fontelicella (Microamnicola) micrococcus (Pilsbry, 1893); Fontelicella micrococcus (Pilsbry, 1893); Hydrobia micrococcus (Pilsbry, 1893)

Species of gastropod

The Oasis Valley springsnail, scientific name Pyrgulopsis micrococcus, is a species of small freshwater snails with an operculum, aquatic gastropod molluscs or micromolluscs in the family Hydrobiidae.

This species is endemic to the United States. Its natural habitat is rivers. It is threatened by habitat loss.
