= Robert E. C. Stearns =

American malacologist (1827–1909)

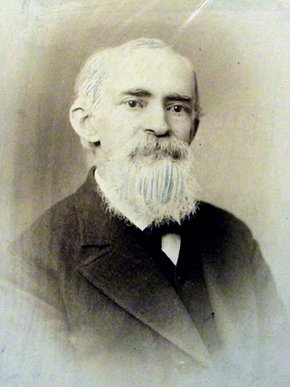
Robert Edwards Carter Stearns

Robert Edwards Carter Stearns (1 February 1827 – 27 July 1909) was an American conchologist.

Robert Stearns was passionate about natural history in his youth. Later he specialised in conchology, especially that of the west coast of the United States. He was a member of the Fisheries Commission (1882–1884) and Secretary of the University of California (Berkeley) (1874–1882). He became Assistant Curator of Molluscs at the National Museum of Natural History (1885–1892). Stearns married Mary Ann Libby on 28 March 1850. They had one child, a daughter.
