= Dwight Willard Taylor =

American malacologist (1932–2006)

- Born: 1932
- Died: 2006 (aged 73–74)
- Scientific career
- Fields: malacology, paleontology

Dwight Willard Taylor (1932–2006) was an American malacologist and paleontologist, a researcher on mollusks. His undergraduate work was at the University of California, Berkeley and his PhD was from Harvard University.

He was instrumental in the creation of the malacological journal, Malacologia.

== Taxa ==
Taylor named and described 132 new taxa of gastropods, mostly freshwater snails in the families Hydrobiidae and Physidae, including:

- Mexipyrgus Taylor, 1966, in the Hydrobiidae
- Coahuilix hubbsi Taylor, 1966, in the Hydrobiidae

A number of taxa of non-marine mollusca were named in honor of him, including:

- The freshwater snail genus Taylorconcha Hershler et al., 1994, in the Hydrobiidae.

== Publications ==
Publications by Dwight Willard Taylor include:

- TAYLOR, D. W., 1949a [19 March], STS winner writes. Science News Letter 55(12): 182 [excerpt of Taylor 1949b].
- TAYLOR, D. W., 1949b [November], A malacological survey of Nantucket Island, Massachusetts. Pp. 18–21 and back cover, in: How you can search for science talent: a book of facts about the Ninth Annual Science Talent Search for Westinghouse Science Scholarships. Washington, D.C., Science Clubs of America/Science Service.
- TAYLOR, D. W., 1950 [11 January], Three new Pyrgulopsis from the Colorado Desert, California. Leaflets in Malacology, 1(7): 27–33.
- TAYLOR, D. W., 1952 [10 July], Notes on the freshwater mollusks of Yellowstone Park, Wyoming. Leaflets in Malacology, 1(9): 43–49, 1 pl.
- TAYLOR, D. W., 1954a [10 January], A new Promenetus (Planorbidae) from Panama. Revista de la Sociedad Malacólogica "Carlos de la Torre" [Havana], 9(2): 37–38.
- TAYLOR, D. W., 1954b [May], Some Late Cenozoic Molluscan Faunas from Kansas and Nebraska. Master's Thesis, University of California, Berkeley. 188 pp. [unpublished].
- TAYLOR, D. W., 1954c [June], Nonmarine molluscs from Barstow Formation of southern California. United States Geological Survey, Professional Paper, 254C: 67–80, plate 20.
- TAYLOR, D. W., 1954d [13 August], A new Pleistocene fauna and new species of fossil snails from the High Plains. Occasional Papers, Museum of Zoology, University of Michigan, 577: 1–16.
- TAYLOR, D. W. & C. W. HIBBARD, 1955, A new Pleistocene fauna from Harper County, Oklahoma. Oklahoma Geological Survey, Circular, 37: 1–23.
- TAYLOR, D. W., 1956, Pliocene mollusks from Jackson Hole, Grand Valley, and Star Valley, Wyoming and Idaho. Pp. 123–125, 1 pl., in: Guidebook, Wyoming Geological Association, 11th Annual Field Conference, 1956, Jackson Hole. 256 pp.
- TAYLOR, D. W., 1957a [January], Late Cenozoic paleoecology and molluscan faunas of the High Plains. Ph.D. Thesis, University of California, Berkeley. vii + 351 pp. [unpublished; not seen; listed by title only in "Index to American Doctoral Dissertations 1956–1957", p. 102 (1958)].
- TAYLOR, D. W., 1957b [13 June], Pliocene fresh-water mollusks from Navajo County, Arizona. Journal of Paleontology, 31(3): 654–661.
- ROBINSON, G. D., G. E. LEWIS & D. W. TAYLOR, 1957 [December], Eocene continental deposits in Three Forks Basin, Montana. Geological Society of America Bulletin, 68(12) [part 2]: 1786 [abstract of paper presented at GSA meeting, Atlantic City, New Jersey, 1–3 November 1957].
- HERRINGTON, H. B. & D. W. TAYLOR, 1958 [15 August], Pliocene and Pleistocene Sphaeriidae (Pelecypoda) from the central United States. Occasional Papers, Museum of Zoology, University of Michigan, 596: 1–128, 1 pl. [new taxa by Herrington alone].
- TAYLOR, D. W., 1958 [12 December], Geologic range and relationships of the freshwater snail Anisus pattersoni. Journal of Paleontology, 32(6): 1149–1153.
- TAYLOR, D. W., 1960a [April?], Distribution of the freshwater clam Pisidium ultramontanum; a zoogeographic inquiry. American Journal of Science, 258A: 325–334, 1 pl. + errata [note: MCZ issue received on 25 April 1960; USNM issue received on 27 April 1960].
- HIBBARD, C. W. & D. W. TAYLOR, 1960 [1 July], Two Late Pleistocene faunas from southwestern Kansas. Contributions from the Museum of Paleontology, The University of Michigan, 16(1): 1–223, pls. 1–16 [new mammalian taxa by Hibbard alone].
- TAYLOR, D. W., 1960b [July?], Late Cenozoic molluscan faunas from the High Plains. United States Geological Survey Professional Paper, 337: iv + 94 pp., pls. 1–4 [note: Library of Congress issue received on 7 July 1960; Univ. of Washington issue received on 21 July 1960].
- TAYLOR, D. W., 1961a [1 April], The freshwater clam Pisidium ultramontanum Prime in Modoc County, California. The Veliger, 3(4): 111.
- TAYLOR, D. W., 1961b [17 November], Comments on the proposed suppression of Paludina lustrica Say, 1821. Z.N.(S.) 730. Bulletin of Zoological Nomenclature, 18(6): 379.
- TAYLOR, D. W. & H. B. HERRINGTON, 1962 [1 January], The freshwater clam Pisidium tremperi (Hannibal). The Veliger, 4(3): 129–131, plate 28.
- McKENNA, M. C., P. ROBINSON & D. W. TAYLOR, 1962 [12 September], Notes on Eocene Mammalia and Mollusca from Tabernacle Butte, Wyoming. American Museum Novitates, 2102: 1–33 [description of mollusks by Taylor alone].
- LOVE, J. D. & D. W. TAYLOR, 1962 [November?], Faulted Pleistocene strata near Jackson, northwestern Wyoming. United States Geological Survey, Professional Paper, 450-D: D136–D139 [note: Library of Congress issue received on 8 November 1962; Univ. of Washington issue received on 26 November 1962].
- TAYLOR, D. W. & N. F. SOHL, 1962 [14 November], An outline of gastropod classification. Malacologia, 1(1): 7–32.
- TAYLOR, D. W., 1963a [April], Mollusks of the Black Butte local fauna. Pages 35–41, in: J. A. SHOTWELL, ed., The Juntura Basin: studies in earth history and paleoecology. Transactions of the American Philosophical Society, (n.s.) 53(1): 1–77.
- TAYLOR, D. W., H. J. WALTER & J. B. BURCH, 1963 [7 August], Freshwater snails of the subgenus Hinkleyia (Lymnaeidae: Stagnicola) from the western United States. Malacologia, 1(2): 237–281, 4 pls.
- RUBIN, M. & D. W. TAYLOR, 1963 [16 August], Radiocarbon activity of shells from living clams and snails. Science, 141(3581): 637.
- TAYLOR, D. W., 1963b [1 October], Erroneous records of freshwater clams (Spaheriidae) from California. The Veliger, 6(2): 111.
- TAYLOR, D. W., 1964 [November], Historical analysis of distribution of west American freshwater molluscs. American Zoologist, 4(4): 436–437 [Abstract of paper presented at American Society of Zoologists meeting, Knoxville, Tennessee, 28 December 1964].
- McCULLOCH, D. S., D. W. TAYLOR & M. RUBIN, 1965 [May], Stratigraphy, non-marine mollusks, and radiometric dates from Quaternary deposits in the Kotzebue Sound area, western Alaska. Journal of Geology, 73(3): 442–453.
- GREGG, W. O. & D. W. TAYLOR, 1965 [31 August], Fontelicella (Prosobranchia: Hydrobiidae), a new genus of west American freshwater snails. Malacologia, 3(1): 103–110.
- TAYLOR, D. W., 1965, The study of Pleistocene nonmarine mollusks in North America. Pp. 597–611, in: H. E. WRIGHT & D. G. FREY, eds., The Quaternary of the United States; a Review Volume for the VII Congress of the International Association for Quaternary Research. Princeton, New Jersey, Princeton University Press. x + 922 pp.
- HIBBARD, C. W., C. E. RAY, D. E. SAVAGE, D. W. TAYLOR & J. E. GUILDAY, 1965, Quaternary mammals of North America. Pp. 509–525, in: H. E. WRIGHT & D. G. FREY, eds., The Quaternary of the United States; a Review Volume for the VII Congress of the International Association for Quaternary Research. Princeton, New Jersey, Princeton University Press. x + 922 pp.
- TAYLOR, D. W., 1966a [1 January], An eastern American freshwater mussel, Anodonta, introduced into Arizona. The Veliger, 8(3): 197–198, plate 28.
- TAYLOR, D. W. & T. UYENO, 1966 [20 January] ["December 1965"], Evolution of host specificity of freshwater salmonid fishes and mussels in the North Pacific region. Venus, 24(3): 199–209 [in Japanese; English abstract].
- TAYLOR, D. W., 1966b [18 August], Summary of North American Blancan nonmarine mollusks. Malacologia, 4(1): 1–172, pls. 1–8. [Note: this journal issue contained three "papers planned for the VII Congress of the International Association for Quaternary Research"].
- TAYLOR, D. W. & W. L. MINCKLEY, 1966 [August] ["September–October"], New world for biologists. Pacific Discovery, 19(5): 18–22, 6 pls., 1 map [Library of Congress issue received 29 August 1966; USNM issue received on 8 Sept. 1966].
- TAYLOR, D. W., 1966c [1 October], A remarkable snail fauna from Coahuila, México. The Veliger, 9(2): 152–228, pls. 8–19.
- TAYLOR, D. W., 1966d [1 October], Review ["A preliminary checklist of invertebrates collected from Lake Tahoe, 1961–1964, by Ted C. Frantz and Almo J. Cardone. Biological Society of Nevada, Occasional Papers, 8: 1–12 (15 January 1966)"]. The Veliger, 9(2): 253.
- TAYLOR, D. W., 1967a [22 February] ["December 1, 1966"], A remarkable snail fauna from Coahuila, Mexico. Report of the American Malacological Union for 1966: 70–72 [Abstract of paper presented at meeting of the AMU-Pacific Division, Seattle, Washington, 19–22 June 1966].
- TAYLOR, D. W., 1967b [4 August], Freshwater clam Sphaerium transversum (Say) in Arizona. Southwestern Naturalist, 12(2): 202–203.
- TAYLOR, D. W., 1967c [1 October], Freshwater mollusks collected by the United States and Mexican Boundary Surveys. The Veliger, 10(2): 152–158.
- TAYLOR, D. W., 1967d [October], Late Pleistocene molluscan shells from the Tule Springs area. In: H. M. WORMINGTON & D. ELLIS, eds., Pleistocene studies in southern Nevada. Nevada State Museum Anthropological Papers, 13: 395–399.
- TAYLOR, D. W., 1968 [20 March], Late Pleistocene nonmarine mollusks from the State of Puebla, Mexico. Annual Report of the American Malacological Union, 34: 76–78 [Abstract of paper that "was announced but was not presented" at meeting of the AMU-Pacific Division, Pacific Grove, California, 28 June – 1 July 1967 (Hanselman, 1968: 66)].
- LONG, G. E. & D. W. TAYLOR, 1970 [9 March], Estuarine mollusks of the Cholla Bay, Sonora, Mexico. The Echo (Western Society of Malacologists), 2: 17–18, 39 [Abstract of paper presented at meeting of the WSM, Pacific Grove, California, 18–21 June 1969].
- TAYLOR, D. W., 1970a [30 June], West American freshwater Mollusca, 1: bibliography of Pleistocene and Recent species. Memoirs, San Diego Society of Natural History, 4: 1–73, 1 plate.
- TAYLOR, D. W., 1970b [14 November], Symposium on the rare and endangered mollusks of North America, 4. Western freshwater mollusks. Malacologia, 10(1): 33–34 [With summary of Taylor's manuscript by Harold D. Murray; Taylor did not attend this symposium (The American Malacological Union, Inc., Annual Reports for 1968, Bulletin, 35: 3)].
- TAYLOR, D. W. & A. G. SMITH, 1971 [1 April], Harold Hannibal (1889–1965) with a review of his molluscan research. The Veliger, 13(4): 303–316, 5 pls.
- TAYLOR, D. W., 1974 [15 July], The Tertiary gastropod Orygoceras found living. Archiv für Molluskenkunde, 104(1–3): 93–96. [Reprinted (1974), with Hungarian title, "Elö harmadkori Orygocerasok," and Hungarian abstract, Soosiana, 2: 37–44].
- TAYLOR, D. W., 1975, Index and bibliography of Late Cenozoic freshwater Mollusca of western North America. Claude W. Hibbard Memorial Volume 1. Papers on Paleontology (Museum of Paleontology, University of Michigan), 10: 1–384 [one-page errata issued in 1976].
- TAYLOR, D. W., 1978 [February], Comments on the proposed designation of a type-species for Pleurocera Rafinesque, 1818. Z.N.(S.) 83. Bulletin of Zoological Nomenclature, 34(4): 199.
- TAYLOR, D. W., 1981 [July], Freshwater mollusks of California: a distributional checklist. California Fish and Game, 67(3): 140–163.
- TAYLOR, D. W. & G. R. SMITH, 1981 [31 December], Pliocene molluscs and fishes from northeastern California and northwestern Nevada. Contributions from the Museum of Paleontology, The University of Michigan, 25(18): 339–413, 19 pls.
- TAYLOR, D. W., 1983 [31 December], Late Tertiary mollusks from the lower Colorado River Valley. Contributions from the Museum of Paleontology, The University of Michigan, 26(13): 289–298.
- TAYLOR, D. W. & E. H. JOKINEN, 1984 [5 November], A new species of freshwater snail (Physa) from seasonal habitats in Connecticut. Freshwater Invertebrate Biology, 3(4): 189–202.
- TAYLOR, D. W., 1985a [February], Pecosorbis, a new genus of fresh-water snails (Planorbidae) from New Mexico. New Mexico Bureau of Mines & Mineral Resources, Circular, 194: 1–17.
- TAYLOR, D. W., 1985b, Miocene freshwater mollusks from the Clarkia fossil site, Idaho. Pp. 73–74, in: C. J. SMILEY, ed., Late Cenozoic history of the Pacific Northwest: Interdisciplinary Studies on the Clarkia Fossil Beds of Northern Idaho. American Association for the Advancement of Science, Pacific Division, San Francisco. 417 pp.
- TAYLOR, D. W., 1985c, Evolution of freshwater drainages and molluscs in western North America. Pp. 265–321, in: C. J. SMILEY, ed., Late Cenozoic history of the Pacific Northwest: Interdisciplinary Studies on the Clarkia Fossil Beds of Northern Idaho. American Association for the Advancement of Science, Pacific Division, San Francisco. 417 pp.
- CONEY, C. C. & D. W. TAYLOR, 1986 [31 January] ["1985"], Systematic position of Quincuncina mitchelli (Simpson, 1896). Annual Report, Western Society of Malacologists, 18: 12–13 ["Abstract revised November 12, 1985, based on new evidence"] [Abstract of paper presented by Coney at WSM meeting, Santa Barbara, California, 18–21 August 1985, which Taylor did not attend; after the meeting, Coney added Taylor as a co-author].
- TAYLOR, D. W., 1986, Fossil molluscs from the Lake Hill archaeological site, Panamint Valley, southeastern California. Contributions of the Great Basin Foundation (San Diego), 2: 42–54.
- TAYLOR, D. W., 1987 [September], Freshwater molluscs from New Mexico and vicinity. New Mexico Bureau of Mines & Mineral Resources, Bulletin, 116: iv + 5–50.
- TAYLOR, D. W. & R. C. BRIGHT, 1987, Drainage history of the Bonneville Basin. Utah Geological Association, Publication, 16: 239–256 [paper presented at symposium, "Cenozoic geology of western Utah", Lake City, Utah, 23–26 September 1987].
- TAYLOR, D. W., 1988a [January], Phylum: Mollusca. Pp. 32–57, in: J. GRAY, ed., Evolution of the freshwater ecosystem: the fossil record. Palaeogeography, Palaeoclimatology, Palaeoecology, 62(14): 1–214.
- TAYLOR, D. W. & J. GRAY, 1988 [January], Class: Mammalia. Pp. 165–175, in: J. GRAY, ed., Evolution of the freshwater ecosystem: the fossil record. Palaeogeography, Palaeoclimatology, Palaeoecology, 62(1–4): 1–214.
- TAYLOR, D. W., 1988b [January], Aspects of freshwater mollusc ecological biogeography. Palaeogeography, Palaeoclimatology, Palaeoecology, 62(1–4): 511–576.
- TAYLOR, D. W., 1988c [2 December], New species of Physa (Gastropoda: Hygrophila) from the western United States. Malacological Review, 21(1–2): 43–79.
- BOUCOT, A. J., H. A. McCLUER, F. ALVAREZ, J. R. P. ROSS, D. W. TAYLOR, W. STRUVE, N. N. SAVAGE & S. TURNER, 1989 [25 September], New Devonian fossils from Saudi Arabia and their biogeographic affinities. Senckenbergiana Lethaea, 69(5–6): 535–597 [Taylor, "Nonmarine molluscs," pp. 557–559].
- GRAY, J. & D. W. TAYLOR, 1992 [May], Late Tertiary environmental change: pollen and mollusc evidence from the Pacific Northwest. Geological Society of America, Abstracts with Programs, 24(5): 28 [abstract of paper presented at the meeting of the Cordilleran Section, GSA, Eugene, Oregon, 11–13 May 1992].
- TAYLOR, D. W., 1994 [June] ["December 1993"], Moluscos dulceacuicolas de Costa Rica: introduccion y lista preliminar. Revista de Biología Tropical (San José, Costa Rica), 41(3A): 653–655 [in Spanish; English abstract].
- TAYLOR, D. W., 1997a [9 January], An old new species of Polymesoda (Bivalvia, Corbiculidae) from the Pacific coast of Mexico. The Festivus, 29(1): 3–5.
- TAYLOR, D. W., 1997b [1 August], A new mussel, Disconaias conchos (Bivalvia: Unionidae) from Rio Conchos of the Rio Grande System, Mexico. Occasional Papers on Mollusks, 5(75): 419–425.
- TAYLOR, D. W., 2002a, New data on biogeography, classification and phylogeny of Physidae (Gastropoda: Hygrophila). Visnyk Zhytomyrskoho Pedahohichnoho Universytetu [Proceedings of the Ivan Franko Zhytomyr Pedagogical University] (Zhytomyr), 10: 24–26 [proceedings of malacological conference held in Zhytomyr, Ukraine, 13–15 May 2002].
- TAYLOR, D. W., 2002b ["1998–1999"], Harold William Harry, 1921–1995. Malacological Review, 31/32: 159–163.
- TAYLOR, D. W., 2003 [March], Introduction to Physidae (Gastropoda: Hygrophila); biogeography, classification, morphology. Revista de Biología Tropical, International Journal of Tropical Biology and Conservation (San José, Costa Rica), 51 (Supplement 1): viii + 287 pp.
- TAYLOR, D. W., 2004a [August], Morphological revision of freshwater snails, Family Physidae/Revisión morfológica de caracoles dulciacuícolas, Familia Physidae. Comunicaciones de la Socieded Malacologica del Uruguay, 8(82–83): 279–282.
- TAYLOR, D. W., 2004b [October], Trans-Pacific relationships in Physidae (Gastropoda, Pulmonata). Pp. 155–156, in: O. YA. SEMENIKHINA, ed., Abstracts of the conference "Mollusks of the Northeastern Asia and Northern Pacific: Biodiversity, Ecology, Biogeography, and Fauna History," October 4–6, 2004, Vladivostok, Russia. Vladivostok, Dalnauka. 176 pp. [abstract] [Taylor did not attend this meeting (K. A. Lutaenko to A. R. Kabat, in litt., May 21, 2007)].
