= Tryonia =

Scientific classification
- Kingdom: Animalia
- Phylum: Mollusca
- Class: Gastropoda
- Subclass: Caenogastropoda
- Order: Littorinimorpha
- Family: Cochliopidae
- Subfamily: Littoridininae
- Genus: Tryonia; Stimpson, 1865

Type species
- Tryonia clathrata Stimpson, 1865

Synonyms
- Durangonella Morrison, 1945

Genus of gastropods

Tryonia is a genus of freshwater snails in the family Hydrobiidae. This genus is sometimes placed in the family Cochliopidae.

Snails of this genus are very small with narrow shells. Females brood young within the genital tract. Species usually live in springs. The genus is differentiated from others by the structure of the male and female reproductive systems.

Most of these snails occur in western North America, especially the Chihuahuan Desert. There are also species known in Florida and Guatemala.

== Species ==
Species include:

- Tryonia adamantina – Diamond Y springsnail, Diamond tryonia
- Tryonia aequicostata – smooth-rib hydrobe
- Tryonia alamosae – Alamosa springsnail, Caliente tryonia
- Tryonia angulata – Sportinggoods tryonia
- Tryonia brevissima – regal hydrobe
- Tryonia brunei – Brune's tryonia
- Tryonia cheatumi – Phantom tryonia, Cheatum's snail
- Tryonia circumstriata
- Tryonia clathrata Stimpson, 1865 – grated tryonia (the type species)
- Tryonia diaboli – devil tryonia
- Tryonia elata – Point of Rocks tryonia
- Tryonia ericae – minute tryonia
- Tryonia gilae – Gila tryonia
- Tryonia imitator – mimic tryonia, California brackish water snail
- Tryonia infernalis – Blue Point Tryonia
- Tryonia kosteri – Koster's tryonia, Sago tryonia
- Tryonia margae – Grapevine Springs elongate tryonia
- Tryonia protea – desert tryonia
- Tryonia quitobaquitae – Quitabaquito tryonia
- Tryonia robusta – robust tryonia
- Tryonia rowlandsi – Grapevine Springs squat tryonia
- Tryonia salina – Cottonball Marsh tryonia
- Tryonia seemani (Frauenfeld, 1863)
- Tryonia variegata – Amargosa tryonia
