= Littoridina =

- Anatomy of the anterior end of the soft parts of an individual of Littoridina gaudichaudii. "Pen" marks the penis.

Scientific classification
- Kingdom: Animalia
- Phylum: Mollusca
- Class: Gastropoda
- Subclass: Caenogastropoda
- Order: Littorinimorpha
- Superfamily: Truncatelloidea
- Family: Cochliopidae
- Genus: Littoridina; Souleyet, 1852

Type species
- Littoridina gaudichaudii Souleyet, 1852 (type by monotypy)

Synonyms
- † Cyclocheila Conrad, 1874 (junior synonym)

Genus of gastropods

Littoridina is a genus of small freshwater snails with a gill and an operculum, aquatic gastropod mollusks in the family Cochliopidae.

== Species ==
Species within the genus Littoridina include:

- Littoridina adamsi (Preston, 1912)
- Littoridina angustiarum Preston, 1915
- † Littoridina bossii L. S. Morton [in Morton & Herbst], 2003
- † Littoridina conica Wesselingh, 2006
- † Littoridina crassa (Etheridge, 1879)
- Littoridina crosseana (Pilsbry, 1910)
- † Littoridina elongata Wesselingh, 2006
- Littoridina faminensis Preston, 1915
- Littoridina forsteri Blume, 1958
- Littoridina gaudichaudii Souleyet, 1852
- † Littoridina gavriloffi L. S. Morton [in Morton & Herbst], 2003
- Littoridina inconspicua Haas, 1938
- Littoridina limosa Preston, 1915
- Littoridina lioneli Preston, 1915
- Littoridina manni Baker, 1913
- Littoridina miaulis Marcus & Marcus, 1965
- Littoridina microcona F. G. Thompson & Hershler, 1991
- Littoridina orcutti (Pilsbry, 1928)
- † Littoridina pebasana (Conrad, 1874)
- Littoridina piscium Orbigny, 1835 – syn. Hydrobia piscium
- Littoridina pusilla Haas, 1949
- Littoridina siolli Haas, 1949

Species brought into synonymy

- Littoridina aperta Haas, 1955: synonym of Heleobia aperta (Haas, 1955) (original combination)
- Littoridina australis (d'Orbigny, 1835): synonym of Heleobia australis (d'Orbigny, 1835)
  - Littoridina australis nana Marcus & Marcus, 1965: synonym of Heleobia australis nana (Er. Marcus & Ev. Marcus, 1963)
- Littoridina castellanosae Gaillard, 1974: synonym of Heleobia castellanosae (Gaillard, 1974) (original combination)
- Littoridina charruana (d'Orbigny, 1840): synonym of Heleobia charruana (d'Orbigny, 1840)
- Littoridina chimbaensis Biese, 1944: synonym of Heleobia chimbaensis (Biese, 1944) (original combination)
- Littoridina cumingii (d'Orbigny, 1835): synonym of Heleobia cumingii (d'Orbigny, 1835) (superseded combination)
- Littoridina cuzcoensis Pilsbry, 1911: synonym of Heleobia cuzcoensis (Pilsbry, 1911) (original combination)
- Littoridina frenata Pilsbry, 1935: synonym of Zetekina frenata (Pilsbry, 1935) (original combination)
- Littoridina hatcheri Pilsbry, 1911: synonym of Strobelitatea hatcheri (Pilsbry, 1911) (original combination)
- Littoridina isabelleana (d'Orbigny, 1840): synonym of Heleobia isabelleana (d'Orbigny, 1840)
- Littoridina lacustris Haas, 1955: synonym of Heleobia lacustris (Haas, 1955) (original combination)
- Littoridina languiensis Haas, 1955: synonym of Heleobia languiensis (Haas, 1955) (original combination)
- Littoridina limariensis Biese, 1944: synonym of Heleobia limariensis (Biese, 1944) (original combination)
- Littoridina loaensis Biese, 1947: synonym of Heleobia loaensis (Biese, 1947) (original combination)
- Littoridina martensi Pilsbry, 1935: synonym of Zetekina martensi (Pilsbry, 1935) (original combination)
- Littoridina opachensis Biese, 1947: synonym of Heleobia opachensis (Biese, 1947) (original combination)
- Littoridina ortoni Pilsbry, 1924: synonym of Heleobia ortoni (Pilsbry, 1924) (original combination)
- Littoridina parchappii (d'Orbigny, 1835): synonym of Heleobia parchappii (d'Orbigny, 1835)
- Littoridina popoensis (Bavay, 1904): synonym of Heleobia popoensis (Bavay, 1904)
- Littoridina profunda Haas, 1955: synonym of Heleobia profunda (Haas, 1955) (original combination)
- Littoridina santiagensis Biese, 1944: synonym of Potamolithus santiagensis (Biese, 1944) (original combination)
- Littoridina saracochae F. Haas, 1955: synonym of Heleobia saracochae (F. Haas, 1955) (original combination)
- Littoridina sphinctostoma Abbott & Ladd, 1951: synonym of Texadina sphinctostoma (Abbott & Ladd, 1951) (original combination)
- Littoridina stiphra Haas, 1955: synonym of Heleobia stiphra (Haas, 1955) (original combination)
- Littoridina tenuipes (Couper, 1844): synonym of Littoridinops tenuipes (Couper, 1844) (superseded combination)
- Littoridina transitoria Biese, 1947: synonym of Heleobia transitoria (Biese, 1947) (original combination)
- Littoridina vestita Haas, 1955: synonym of Heleobia vestita (Haas, 1955) (original combination)
- † Littoridina woodringi Pilsbry, 1934: synonym of † Zetekina woodringi (Pilsbry, 1934) (new combination)
