= Balmorhea =

Balmorhea may refer to:

- Balmorhea, Texas, a town in the US
- Balmorhea Lake, near Balmorhea, Texas
- Balmorhea State Park, near Balmorhea, Texas
- Balmorhea (band), from Austin, Texas
  - Balmorhea (album), 2007
