= Hubbs =

Hubbs is a surname. It may refer to the following notable people:

- Carl Leavitt Hubbs (1894–1979), American ichthyologist
- Clark Hubbs (1921-2008), American ichthyologist and son of Carl Leavitt Hubbs
- Dan Hubbs (born 1971), American college baseball coach
- Irving Hubbs (1870–1952), American lawyer and politician
- John Hubbs (1874–1952), Canadian politician
- Ken Hubbs (1941–1964), American baseball player
- Orlando Hubbs (1840–1930), American politician
- Robert Hubbs III (born 1985), American basketball player

== See also ==
- Coahuilix de hubbs snail
- Hubbs' beaked whale
- Hubbs House
