= Heleobia =

Scientific classification
- Kingdom: Animalia
- Phylum: Mollusca
- Class: Gastropoda
- Subclass: Caenogastropoda
- Order: Littorinimorpha
- Family: Cochliopidae
- Subfamily: Semisalsinae
- Genus: Heleobia; Stimpson, 1865

Type species
- Paludestrina culminea d'Orbigny, 1840

Synonyms
- Ventrosia Radoman, 1977

Genus of gastropods

Heleobia is a genus of small freshwater and brackish water snails with a gill and an operculum, aquatic gastropod mollusks in the family Cochliopidae and the superfamily Truncatelloidea.

Heleobia is one of three genera (together with Semisalsa and Heleobops) within the subfamily Semisalsinae. Some authors treated Semisalsa as a subgenus of Heleobia.

== Species ==
Species within the genus Heleobia include:

- Heleobia andicola (d'Orbigny, 1835)
- Heleobia australis (d'Orbigny)
- Heleobia castellanosae (Gaillard, 1974)
- Heleobia berryi (Pilsbry, 1924)
- Heleobia charruana (d'Orbigny, 1840)
- Heleobia conexa (M. C. Gaillard, 1974)
- Heleobia contempta (Dautzenberg, 1894)
- Heleobia culminea (d'Orbigny, 1840) - the type species
- Heleobia deserticola Collado, 2015
- Heleobia dobrogica Grossu & Negrea, 1989
- Heleobia hatcheri (Pilsbry, 1911)
- Heleobia isabelleana (d'Orbigny, 1840)
- Heleobia longiscata (Bourguignat, 1856)
- Heleobia parchappii (d'Orbigny, 1835)
- Heleobia piscium (d'Orbigny, 1835)
- Heleobia robusta da Silva & Veitenheimer-Mendes, 2004

Species brought into synonymy

- subgenus Heleobia (Semisalsa) Radoman, 1974: synonym of Semisalsa Radoman, 1974
- Heleobia dalmatica (Radoman, 1974): synonym of Semisalsa dalmatica Radoman, 1974
- Heleobia stagnorum (Gmelin, 1791): synonym of Semisalsa stagnorum (Gmelin, 1791)
