= Clifton Springs =

Clifton Springs is the name of several places,

- Clifton Springs, New York, a village located within Ontario County, New York, USA
- Clifton Springs, Victoria, a coastal town overlooking Corio Bay, approximately 20 km east of Geelong, Victoria, Australia
- Clifton Springs at Overlook Park (Oviedo, Florida)
