= Amargosa tryonia =

Conservation status
- Data Deficient (IUCN 2.3)

- Imperiled (NatureServe)

Scientific classification
- Kingdom: Animalia
- Phylum: Mollusca
- Class: Gastropoda
- Subclass: Caenogastropoda
- Order: Littorinimorpha
- Family: Cochliopidae
- Genus: Tryonia
- Species: T. variegata

Binomial name
- Tryonia variegata Hershler & Sada, 1987

Species of gastropod

The Amargosa tryonia, scientific name Tryonia variegata, is a species of small freshwater snail with a gill and an operculum, an aquatic gastropod mollusc in the family Cochliopidae. This species is endemic to California, United States. The common name refers to the Amargosa River.
