= Tryonia imitator =

Conservation status
- Data Deficient (IUCN 2.3)

- Imperiled (NatureServe)

Scientific classification
- Kingdom: Animalia
- Phylum: Mollusca
- Class: Gastropoda
- Subclass: Caenogastropoda
- Order: Littorinimorpha
- Family: Cochliopidae
- Genus: Tryonia
- Species: T. imitator

Binomial name
- Tryonia imitator Pilsbry, 1899

Synonyms
- Paludestrina curta Arnold, 1903; Paludestrina imitator Pilsbry, 1899

Species of gastropod

Tryonia imitator, also known as the California brackish water snail and the mimic tryonia, is a species of very small brackish water snail that have an operculum, aquatic gastropod mollusks in the family Hydrobiidae.

This species is endemic to the United States.
