= Durangonella de Coahuila snail =

Conservation status
- Vulnerable (IUCN 2.3)

Scientific classification
- Kingdom: Animalia
- Phylum: Mollusca
- Class: Gastropoda
- Subclass: Caenogastropoda
- Order: Littorinimorpha
- Family: Cochliopidae
- Genus: Tryonia
- Species: T. coahuilae

Binomial name
- Tryonia coahuilae Taylor, 1966

Species of gastropod

The durangonella de Coahuila snail, scientific name Durangonella coahuilae, is a species is a genus of minute freshwater snails with an operculum, aquatic gastropod molluscs or micromolluscs in the family Hydrobiidae.

This species is endemic to Mexico; Coahuila being a state in the northeastern part of Mexico.
