= Gila tryonia =

Conservation status
- Data Deficient (IUCN 2.3)

- Critically Imperiled (NatureServe)

Scientific classification
- Kingdom: Animalia
- Phylum: Mollusca
- Class: Gastropoda
- Subclass: Caenogastropoda
- Order: Littorinimorpha
- Family: Cochliopidae
- Genus: Tryonia
- Species: T. gilae

Binomial name
- Tryonia gilae Taylor, 1987

Synonyms
- Tryonia gilae Hershler, 1988

Species of gastropod

The Gila tryonia (Tryonia gilae) is a species of freshwater snail in the family Cochliopidae. It is endemic to Arizona in the United States, where it is known only from Graham County.

This snail has a conical, elongated shell reaching about 3.4 millimeters in length and 3.3 in height. The shell is transparent. The animal has fleshy lips on its snout.

This snail occurs at just a few spots in springs in the Upper Gila River system near Bylas, Arizona.
