= BISD =

BISD is an acronym that may refer to:

- Bangladesh International School, Dammam an international Cambridge associate school in Dammam, Saudi Arabia.
- Bainbridge Island School District, a school district in Washington
- Basic Instruments and Selected Documents, a document series published yearly by the GATT from 1951 until 1995 and afterwards by the WTO
- Balmorhea Independent School District, a school district in Texas
- Beaumont Independent School District, as school district in Texas.
- Before I Self Destruct, a 2009 album by rapper 50 Cent
- Birdville Independent School District, a school district in Texas
- Brazosport Independent School District, a school district in Texas
- Brownsville Independent School District, a school district in Texas
- Brownwood Independent School District, a school district in Texas
- Bryan Independent School District, a school district in Texas
- Bastrop Independent School District, a school district in Texas
