= Quitabaquito tryonia =

Conservation status
- Data Deficient (IUCN 2.3)

- Critically Imperiled (NatureServe)

Scientific classification
- Kingdom: Animalia
- Phylum: Mollusca
- Class: Gastropoda
- Subclass: Caenogastropoda
- Order: Littorinimorpha
- Family: Cochliopidae
- Genus: Tryonia
- Species: T. quitobaquitae

Binomial name
- Tryonia quitobaquitae Hershler, 1988

Species of gastropod

The Quitabaquito tryonia, scientific name Tryonia quitobaquitae, is a species of small freshwater snail with a gill and an operculum. It is an aquatic gastropod mollusc in the family Cochliopidae. This species is endemic to the US.

The common name refers to the Quitabaquito Springs Oasis, in Organ Pipe Cactus National Monument, Arizona.
