= Eupaludestrina galileae =

Conservation status
- Vulnerable (IUCN 3.1)

Scientific classification
- Kingdom: Animalia
- Phylum: Mollusca
- Class: Gastropoda
- Subclass: Caenogastropoda
- Order: Littorinimorpha
- Family: Cochliopidae
- Genus: Eupaludestrina
- Species: E. galileae

Binomial name
- Eupaludestrina galileae (Preston, 1914)

Synonyms
- Bithinella galileae Preston, 1914; Bithinella vexillum Preston, 1914; Heleobia galileae (Preston, 1914)

Species of gastropod

Eupaludestrina galileae is a species of small brackish water snail with a gill and an operculum, an aquatic gastropod mollusc in the family Cochliopidae. The species is endemic to the edge of the Sea of Galilee in Israel.
