= Aphaostracon chalarogyrum =

Conservation status
- Critically Imperiled (NatureServe)

Scientific classification
- Kingdom: Animalia
- Phylum: Mollusca
- Class: Gastropoda
- Subclass: Caenogastropoda
- Order: Littorinimorpha
- Family: Cochliopidae
- Genus: Aphaostracon
- Species: A. chalarogyrum

Binomial name
- Aphaostracon chalarogyrum F. G. Thompson, 1968

Synonyms
- Aphaostracon chalarogyrus F. G. Thompson, 1968 incorrect grammatical agreement of specific epithet

Species of gastropod

Aphaostracon chalarogyrum, the freemouth hydrophobe or shortened freemouth hydrobe, is a species of small freshwater snail found in Florida. The snail is endemic to Magnesia Springs, within the 33,058 acres (13,378 ha) Lochloosa Wildlife Management Area in Alachua County.
