= Minute tryonia =

Conservation status
- Data Deficient (IUCN 3.1)

- Critically Imperiled (NatureServe)

Scientific classification
- Kingdom: Animalia
- Phylum: Mollusca
- Class: Gastropoda
- Subclass: Caenogastropoda
- Order: Littorinimorpha
- Family: Cochliopidae
- Genus: Tryonia
- Species: T. ericae

Binomial name
- Tryonia ericae Hershler & Sada, 1987

Species of gastropod

The minute tryonia scientific name Tryonia ericae, is a species of very small or minute freshwater snail with a gill and an operculum, an aquatic gastropod mollusc in the family Cochliopidae. This species is endemic to the United States.
