= Cochliopina compacta =

Conservation status
- Data Deficient (IUCN 2.3)

Scientific classification
- Kingdom: Animalia
- Phylum: Mollusca
- Class: Gastropoda
- Subclass: Caenogastropoda
- Order: Littorinimorpha
- Family: Cochliopidae
- Genus: Cochliopina
- Species: C. compacta

Binomial name
- Cochliopina compacta (Pilsbry, 1910)

Synonyms
- Cochliopa compacta Pilsbry, 1910

Species of gastropod

Cochliopina compacta is a species of very small freshwater snails in the family Cochliopidae. This species is endemic to Mexico.
