= Heleobia robusta =

Scientific classification
- Kingdom: Animalia
- Phylum: Mollusca
- Class: Gastropoda
- Subclass: Caenogastropoda
- Order: Littorinimorpha
- Family: Cochliopidae
- Genus: Heleobia
- Species: H. robusta

Binomial name
- Heleobia robusta da Silva & Veitenheimer-Mendes, 2004

Species of gastropod

Heleobia robusta is a species of very small aquatic snail, an operculate gastropod mollusc in the family Cochliopidae.
