= Cochliopina =

Cochliopina Temporal range: Miocene–Present

Scientific classification
- Kingdom: Animalia
- Phylum: Mollusca
- Class: Gastropoda
- Subclass: Caenogastropoda
- Order: Littorinimorpha
- Family: Cochliopidae
- Subfamily: Cochliopinae
- Genus: Cochliopina; Morrison, 1946

Type species
- Cochliopina riograndensis Pilsbry & Ferriss, 1906

Species
- List: C. australis Morrison, 1946; C. bourguyi (Roxo, 1924); C. colombiana (Nuttall, 1990); C. compacta (Pilsbry, 1910); C. convexa Wesselingh, 2006; C. dulcensis (Marshall, 1920); C. extremis Morrison, 1946; C. francesae (Goodrich & van der Schalie, 1937); C. fratercula Morrison, 1946; C. guatemalensis (Morelet, 1851); C. hauxwelli (Nuttall, 1990); C. hinkleyi (Pilsbry, 1920); C. infundibulum (von Martens, 1899); C. izabal (Pilsbry, 1920); C. juradoi Morrison, 1946; C. milleri Taylor, 1966; C. minor (Pilsbry, 1920); C. navalis Morrison, 1946; C. picta (Pilsbry, 1910); C. riograndensis (Pilsbry & Ferriss, 1906); C. tryoniana (Pilsbry, 1890); C. wetmorei Morrison, 1946; C. zeteki Morrison, 1946

Genus of gastropods

Cochliopina is a genus of very small freshwater snails in the family Cochliopidae. Twenty-three species are known, including four fossil species known from Miocene Colombia and Peru.

== Species ==
Extant species in this genus include:

- Cochliopina australis Morrison, 1946
- Cochliopina compacta (Pilsbry, 1910)
- Cochliopina dulcensis (Marshall, 1920)
- Cochliopina extremis Morrison, 1946
- Cochliopina francesae (Goodrich & van der Schalie, 1937)
- Cochliopina fratercula Morrison, 1946
- Cochliopina guatemalensis (Morelet, 1851)
- Cochliopina hinkleyi (Pilsbry, 1920)
- Cochliopina infundibulum (von Martens, 1899)
- Cochliopina izabal (Pilsbry, 1920)
- Cochliopina juradoi Morrison, 1946
- Cochliopina milleri Taylor, 1966
- Cochliopina minor (Pilsbry, 1920)
- Cochliopina navalis Morrison, 1946
- Cochliopina picta (Pilsbry, 1910)
- Cochliopina riograndensis (Pilsbry & Ferriss, 1906)
- Cochliopina tryoniana (Pilsbry, 1890)
- Cochliopina wetmorei Morrison, 1946
- Cochliopina zeteki Morrison, 1946

Fossil species in this genus include:

- Cochliopina bourguyi (Roxo, 1924)
- Cochliopina colombiana (Nuttall, 1990)
- Cochliopina convexa Wesselingh, 2006
- Cochliopina hauxwelli (Nuttall, 1990)

Species formerly placed in this genus include:

- Cochliopina boetzkesi (Miller, 1879) – now accepted as Littoridina boetzkesi (Miller, 1879)
- Cochliopina ecuadoriana (Miller, 1879) – now accepted as Littoridina ecuadoriana (Miller, 1879)
