= T. angulata =

T. angulata may refer to:

- Tryonia angulata, the sportingoods tryonia, a gastropod species endemic to the United States
- Turbinella angulata, the West Indian chank shell, a very large tropical sea snail species found in the Western Atlantic Ocean from the Florida Keys and the Bahamas south to Cuba, Jamaica and Haiti and from the Caribbean coast of Mexico, Belize, Honduras, Nicaragua, Costa Rica, Panama and Colombia

== See also ==
- Angulata
