= Aphaostracon asthenes =

Conservation status
- Vulnerable (IUCN 2.3)

- Critically Imperiled (NatureServe)

Scientific classification
- Kingdom: Animalia
- Phylum: Mollusca
- Class: Gastropoda
- Subclass: Caenogastropoda
- Order: Littorinimorpha
- Family: Cochliopidae
- Genus: Aphaostracon
- Species: A. asthenes

Binomial name
- Aphaostracon asthenes F. G. Thompson, 1968

Species of gastropod

The Blue Spring aphaostracon or Blue Spring hydrobe, scientific name Aphaostracon asthenes, is a species of small freshwater snail with a gill and an operculum, an aquatic gastropod mollusk in the family Cochliopidae.

== Distribution ==
This species is endemic to Blue Spring in Florida.
