= Miller's snail =

Conservation status
- Vulnerable (IUCN 2.3)

Scientific classification
- Kingdom: Animalia
- Phylum: Mollusca
- Class: Gastropoda
- Subclass: Caenogastropoda
- Order: Littorinimorpha
- Family: Cochliopidae
- Genus: Cochliopina
- Species: C. milleri

Binomial name
- Cochliopina milleri Taylor, 1966

Species of gastropod

Miller's snail, scientific name Cochliopina milleri, is a species of very small freshwater snails that have an operculum, aquatic gastropod mollusks in the family Hydrobiidae, the mud snails. This species is endemic to Mexico.
