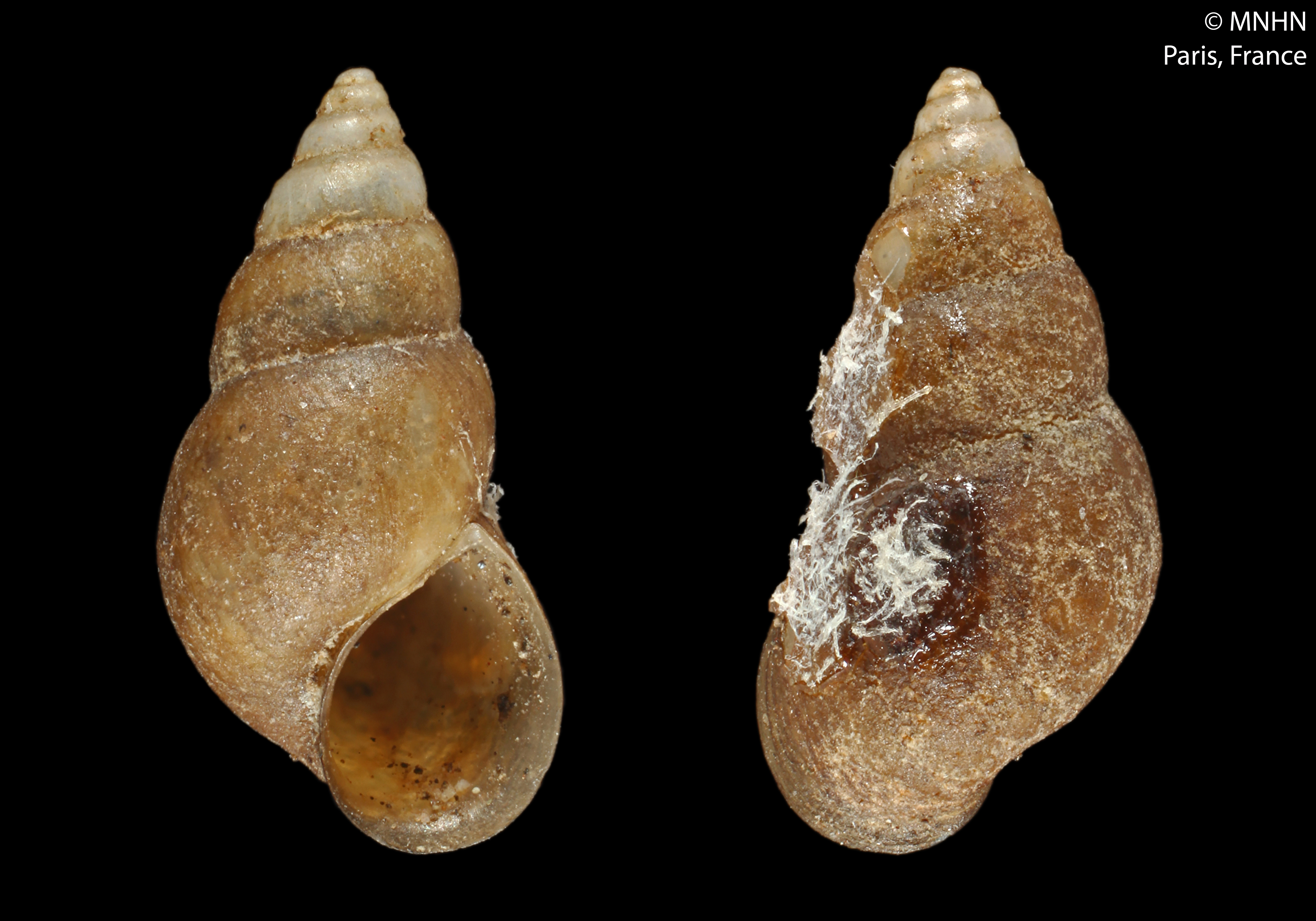
- Shell of Littoridina gaudichaudii (syntype at MNHN, Paris)

Conservation status
- Extinct (IUCN 2.3)

Scientific classification
- Kingdom: Animalia
- Phylum: Mollusca
- Class: Gastropoda
- Subclass: Caenogastropoda
- Order: Littorinimorpha
- Family: Cochliopidae
- Genus: Littoridina
- Species: †L. gaudichaudii

Binomial name
- †Littoridina gaudichaudii Souleyet, 1852

= Littoridina gaudichaudii =

Species of gastropod

Littoridina gaudichaudii is a species of small freshwater snail with a gill and an operculum, an aquatic gastropod mollusk in the family Cochliopidae.

This species is endemic to Ecuador. It is declared extinct.
