= Heleobops =

Scientific classification
- Kingdom: Animalia
- Phylum: Mollusca
- Class: Gastropoda
- Subclass: Caenogastropoda
- Order: Littorinimorpha
- Family: Cochliopidae
- Subfamily: Semisalsinae
- Genus: Heleobops; Thompson, 1968

Type species
- Heleobops docima Thompson, 1968

Genus of gastropods

Heleobops is a genus of very small aquatic snails, operculate gastropod mollusks in the family Cochliopidae.

Heleobops is one of three genera (together with Heleobia and Semisalsa) within the subfamily Semisalsinae.

== Species ==
Species within the genus Heleobops include:

- Heleobops carrikeri Davis & McKee, 1989
- Heleobops docimus Thompson, 1968
