= Texadina barretti =

Conservation status
- Apparently Secure (NatureServe)

Scientific classification
- Kingdom: Animalia
- Phylum: Mollusca
- Class: Gastropoda
- Subclass: Caenogastropoda
- Order: Littorinimorpha
- Family: Cochliopidae
- Genus: Texadina
- Species: T. barretti

Binomial name
- Texadina barretti (Morrison, 1965)

Synonyms
- Odostomia barretti Morrison, 1965; Hydrobia booneae Morrison, 1973

Species of gastropod

Texadina barretti, commonly known as the Boone hydrobe, is a species of very small aquatic snail, an operculate gastropod mollusc in the family Cochliopidae.

== Distribution and habitat ==
Texadina barretti is native to the brackish waters of Florida, Mississippi, Louisiana, and Texas in the United States. It occurs at depths of up to 2.4 m (7 ft 10 in).

== Description ==
The maximum recorded shell length is 3.7 mm.
