= Aphaostracon xynoelictum =

Conservation status
- Data Deficient (IUCN 3.1)

- Critically Imperiled (NatureServe)

Scientific classification
- Kingdom: Animalia
- Phylum: Mollusca
- Class: Gastropoda
- Subclass: Caenogastropoda
- Order: Littorinimorpha
- Family: Cochliopidae
- Genus: Aphaostracon
- Species: A. xynoelictum

Binomial name
- Aphaostracon xynoelictum Thompson, 1968

Synonyms
- Aphaostracon xynoelictus Thompson, 1968

Species of gastropod

Aphaostracon xynoelictum, the Fenney Spring hydrobe, is a species of freshwater snails in the family Hydrobiidae.

== Distribution ==
This species is endemic to Fenney Springs in Sumter County, Florida. It is threatened by habitat loss.
