= Onobops crassus =

Scientific classification
- Kingdom: Animalia
- Phylum: Mollusca
- Class: Gastropoda
- Subclass: Caenogastropoda
- Order: Littorinimorpha
- Family: Cochliopidae
- Genus: Onobops
- Species: O. crassus

Binomial name
- Onobops crassus F. G. Thompson, 1968

Species of gastropod

Onobops crassus is a species of very small aquatic snail, an operculate gastropod mollusc in the family Cochliopidae.

== Description ==
The maximum recorded shell length is 2.7 mm.

== Habitat ==
Minimum recorded depth is 0 m. Maximum recorded depth is 0 m.
