= Point of Rocks tryonia =

Conservation status
- Data Deficient (IUCN 2.3)

- Critically Imperiled (NatureServe)

Scientific classification
- Kingdom: Animalia
- Phylum: Mollusca
- Class: Gastropoda
- Subclass: Caenogastropoda
- Order: Littorinimorpha
- Family: Cochliopidae
- Genus: Tryonia
- Species: T. elata

Binomial name
- Tryonia elata Hershler & Sada, 1987

Species of gastropod

The Point of Rocks tryonia, scientific name Tryonia elata, is a species of freshwater snail, an aquatic gastropod mollusc in the family Cochliopidae.

This species is endemic to the United States. The distribution of the species is restricted to the Point of Rocks Springs in the Ash Meadows National Wildlife Refuge and does not occur in the nearby Kings Pool.
