= L. palustris =

L. palustris may refer to:

- Lathyrus palustris, a wild pea species known by the common name marsh pea, native to Europe, Asia, and North America.
- Littoridinops palustris, a species of very small aquatic snail, an operculate gastropod mollusk in the family Hydrobiidae.
- Ludwigia palustris, a flowering plant species in the evening primrose family known by the common names marsh seedbox and water purslane.
