= 1908 Populist National Convention =

- 1908 presidential election
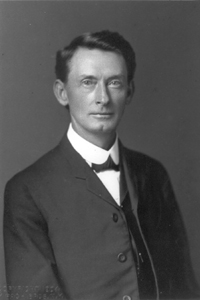
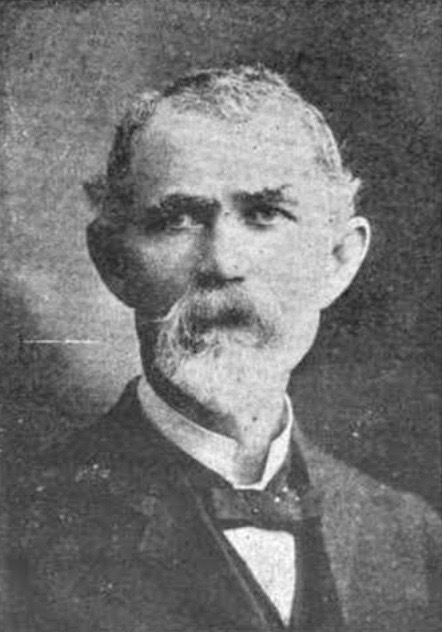
- Nominees (Watson and Williams)

Convention
- Dates: April 2–3, 1908
- City: St. Louis, Missouri
- Chair: George A. Honneker of New Jersey

Candidates
- Presidential nominee: Thomas E. Watson of Georgia
- Vice-presidential nominee: Samuel Williams of Indiana

The 1908 Populist National Convention was held April 2–3, 1908, in St. Louis, Missouri. It saw the People's Party (more commonly known as the "Populist Party") nominate Thomas E. Watson for president and Samuel Williams for vice president. The nomination was decided after the convention rejected an effort to delay the party's nomination until after the Democratic National Convention, which was pushed by delegates from Nebraska that favored electoral fusion with Democrats if that party nominated William Jennings Bryan.

== Background ==
In 1904 the national People's Party (Populist Party) ticket fared fairly well. Its total was twice the party's total in the previous presidential election, and in ten states, it received over 1% of the vote. It also offered 47 candidates for the House of Representatives, though the only ones elected were cross-endorsed by one of the major parties. The party remained in fusion with either the Democrats or the Republicans in many states.

The following three years were a trying time for the party. When Democrats began to call for the nomination of Bryan in 1908, western Populist leader Thomas Tibbles announced that the People's Party would probably not support him since he had gone into the hands of the Eastern business interests. Two months later, Nebraska Democrats decided in their state convention to end fusion with the Populists, but they changed their mind after an all-night conference. In the midterm elections the party only offered 10 candidates for House, and the Kansas People's Party officially disbanded in December when that state party's leader announced that he was joining the Republicans.

By late 1907, many Populists were hoping that Thomas Watson would agree to run for president again. The previous three years had been unusual for Watson. He gave a speech to a gathering of farmers in Greensborough, Georgia and while preparing for supper, the house where he was staying was burned. In mid-1906, Watson called on Georgia Populists to vote for Hoke Smith for governor in the Democratic primary, which fueled speculation that Watson was thinking of returning to the Democrats. In early 1907, Watson started a network of Populist-leaning publications to keep the party's principles alive; Tibbles was chosen to serve as the chief editor. One month later, someone fired shots into the Watsons' house in Augusta. He had an altercation with an African-American porter on a train; when the porter said that he was unable to increase the train's speed, Watson hit the man in the face with the cap of his cane.

The People's Party National Committee met on November 26, 1907, to make preparations for the 1908 national convention. National chairman James Ferriss indicated that Thomas Watson was the front runner for the nomination, saying that the party hoped to forge an alliance with one or more of the other minor parties, including possibly the Independence League or the Prohibitionists. In early 1908, however, at least one member of the national committee believed that Senator Robert La Follette of Wisconsin would win the Populist nomination.

== Logistics ==
The convention was held April 2–3, 1904, in St. Louis, Missouri. The party deliberately opted to hold its convention relatively early and before those of the major parties, with the prospect of electoral fusion with either major party having fallen out of favor with the party's remaining stalwarts.

The convention was reported to have had respectable attendance, with many states having sizable or full delegations.

== Convention proceedings ==
The convention was called to order by the national party chairman, Jasper H. Ferriss. The convention selected J. S. Coxey of Ohio as its temporary chairman, and John Allan of Oklahoma as its temporary secretary. It laker selected George A. Honneker of New Jersey as permanent chairman of the convention.

On the first day of the convention, the delegation from Nebraska worked to adjourn the convention; since they had already decided to support Bryan if he became the Democratic nominee. They managed to delay the official organization of the convention all day. One of their delegates, A.M. Walling of Nebraska, told the New York Times "we shall bolt if the convention attempts to nominate Thomas E. Watson, or any one else. We are not alone, for we have assurances that Minnesota, Georgia, and possibly Michigan and Kansas will walk out when we do". Ultimately, these efforts by the Nebraska delegates to adjourn the convention until after the major party conventions failed.

The convention was organized on the second day and completed all its relevant business. Watson supporters chose George A. Honnecker of New Jersey to serve as the permanent chairman, defeating the Bryan supporters' choice, Jacob Coxey. The platform called for inflation of the currency, public ownership of railroads, telephones, and telegraphs, labor legislation, and a ban on futures gambling. When the time for nominations began, a schism took place; Watson's name was placed in nomination, and the Nebraska delegation bolted. They were followed by T.J. Weighan, the sole delegate from Minnesota. Watson was then nominated for president; his running mate was Samuel Williams of Indiana.

=== Nominations ===
The convention unanimously nominated Thomas E. Watson of Georgia for president and Samuel Williams of Indiana for vice president.

=== Election of national committee officers ===
The convention also elected the officers of the party's national committee. Ferriss was re-elected as chairman. Jay W. Forrest of New York was elected vice chairman and treasurer, while Joseph A. Parker of Kentucky was elected secretary.

=== Platform and resolutions ===
The convention ratified a previously-drafted platform. The platform largely resembled the platform adopted at the national convention held four years prior, except that its money plank was expanded with an additional paragraph reading,

The issue and distribution of full legal tender money from the treasury shall not be through private banks, preferred or otherwise, but direct to the people without interest payment for the construction and purchase of federal and internal improvements, utilities, and the employment of labor.

The convention also adopted separate resolutions, including one favoring expanded bank reserves and one calling for individual land ownership to be capped at 1,000 acres (400 ha).
