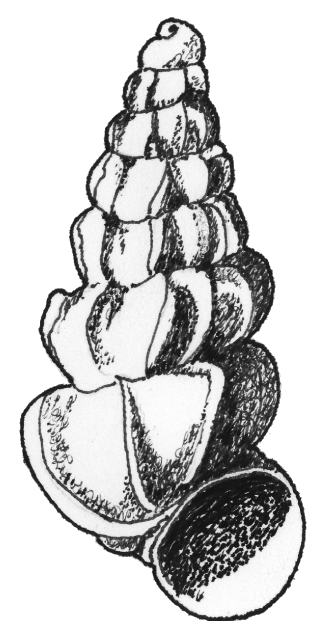
- Drawing of an apertural view of a shell of Paludiscala caramba. The height of the shell is 2.5 mm.

Conservation status
- Vulnerable (IUCN 2.3)

Scientific classification
- Kingdom: Animalia
- Phylum: Mollusca
- Class: Gastropoda
- Subclass: Caenogastropoda
- Order: Littorinimorpha
- Family: Cochliopidae
- Genus: Paludiscala
- Species: P. caramba

Binomial name
- Paludiscala caramba Taylor, 1966

= Paludiscala caramba =

Species of gastropod

Paludiscala caramba, the paludiscala de oro snail, is a species of freshwater snail, an aquatic gastropod mollusc in the family Cochliopidae. This species is endemic to freshwater marshes in Coahuila State, Mexico.

The specific name caramba is from a Spanish exclamation expressing surprise: "caramba". This name was given by its discoverer, the American malacologist Dwight Taylor, who said the name was a loose translation of his "original remarks at seeing the shells," which are surprisingly similar to those of a predominantly marine family, the Epitoniidae.
