= Spurwinkia salsa =

Conservation status
- Least Concern (IUCN 3.1)

- Apparently Secure (NatureServe)

Scientific classification
- Kingdom: Animalia
- Phylum: Mollusca
- Class: Gastropoda
- Subclass: Caenogastropoda
- Order: Littorinimorpha
- Family: Cochliopidae
- Genus: Spurwinkia
- Species: S. salsa

Binomial name
- Spurwinkia salsa (Pilsbry, 1905)

Synonyms
- Paludestrina salsa Pilsbry, 1905; Hydrobia salsa (Pilsbry, 1905)

Species of gastropod

Spurwinkia salsa, commonly known as the saltmarsh hydrobe, is a species of very small aquatic snail, an operculate gastropod mollusk in the family Cochliopidae.

== Distribution ==
Distribution of Spurwinkia salsa in the North West Atlantic is from 44.01°N to 38.25°N and from 75.9°W to 69.6°W.

Distribution of Spurwinkia salsa in the USA: Gulf of Maine, Maine, New Hampshire, Massachusetts, Connecticut, New Jersey and Maryland.

== Description ==
The maximum recorded shell length is 7.1 mm.

== Habitat ==
Brackish water. Minimum recorded depth is 0 m. Maximum recorded depth is 6 m.

== Life History ==
Spurwinkia salsa is a species of herbivorous snail that grazes on detritus, diatoms, and other species of periphyton in estuarine environments. They also serve as prey for riparian and aquatic predators such as shorebirds, crabs, and fishes.

Spurwinkia salsa is native to shallow brackish waters along the eastern North American coast, occurring in the northwest Atlantic from New Brunswick, Canada to Florida, USA. An invasive population in south San Francisco Bay, California was also discovered in 2008; however, given their small size, these snails may have been introduced in the 19th or 20th century and not discovered until more recently. The most likely explanation for this invasion is anthropogenic transport, as this distribution cannot be reasonably explained by any of the species’s natural transport mechanisms.

Spurwinkia salsa do not demonstrate sexual dimorphism, with males and females having shells that are not significantly different from one another. On average, the shells of mature individuals are made up of 6.0 whorls; however, shells up to 6.5 whorls and over 7mm in length have been observed. While previously described as Hydrobia salsa, this species was later reclassified into the genus Spurwinkia due to observed differences in the digestive and reproductive tracts not seen in any other species of Hydrobia.
