= Aphaostracon monas =

Conservation status
- Vulnerable (IUCN 2.3)

- Critically Imperiled (NatureServe)

Scientific classification
- Kingdom: Animalia
- Phylum: Mollusca
- Class: Gastropoda
- Subclass: Caenogastropoda
- Order: Littorinimorpha
- Family: Cochliopidae
- Genus: Aphaostracon
- Species: A. monas

Binomial name
- Aphaostracon monas (Pilsbry, 1899)

Synonyms
- Paludestrina monas Pilsbry, 1899

Species of gastropod

The Wekiwa hydrobe or Wekiwa springs aphaostracon, scientific name Aphaostracon monas, is a species of small freshwater snail, and aquatic gastropod mollusk in the family Cochliopidae.

== Distribution ==
This species is endemic to the Wekiwa Springs State Park in Florida; for which it is named. The continued existence of this species is threatened by habitat loss.
