= Tryonia cheatumi =

Conservation status
- Data Deficient (IUCN 2.3)

- Critically Imperiled (NatureServe)
- Endangered (ESA)

Scientific classification
- Kingdom: Animalia
- Phylum: Mollusca
- Class: Gastropoda
- Subclass: Caenogastropoda
- Order: Littorinimorpha
- Family: Cochliopidae
- Genus: Tryonia
- Species: T. cheatumi

Binomial name
- Tryonia cheatumi (Pilsbry, 1935)

Synonyms
- Potamopyrgus cheatumi Pilsbry, 1935

Species of gastropod

Tryonia cheatumi, also known as Cheatum's snail and the Phantom tryonia, is a species of small freshwater snails with a gill and an operculum, an aquatic gastropod mollusc in the family Hydrobiidae.

This species is endemic to the United States.
