= Aphaostracon pycnum =

Conservation status
- Vulnerable (IUCN 3.1)

- Critically Imperiled (NatureServe)

Scientific classification
- Kingdom: Animalia
- Phylum: Mollusca
- Class: Gastropoda
- Subclass: Caenogastropoda
- Order: Littorinimorpha
- Family: Cochliopidae
- Genus: Aphaostracon
- Species: A. pycnum

Binomial name
- Aphaostracon pycnum Thompson, 1968

Synonyms
- Aphaostracon pycnus Thompson, 1968

Species of gastropod

The dense hydrobe, scientific name Aphaostracon pycnum, is a species of small freshwater snails with a gill and an operculum, aquatic gastropod mollusks in the family Cochliopidae.

== Distribution ==
This species is endemic to Alexander Springs and Silver Glen Springs in Florida.
