= Juturnia brunei =

Conservation status
- Critically endangered, possibly extinct (IUCN 3.1)

Scientific classification
- Kingdom: Animalia
- Phylum: Mollusca
- Class: Gastropoda
- Subclass: Caenogastropoda
- Order: Littorinimorpha
- Family: Cochliopidae
- Genus: Juturnia
- Species: J. brunei

Binomial name
- Juturnia brunei (Taylor, 1987)

Synonyms
- Tryonia (Paupertryonia) brunei Taylor, 1987} Tryonia brunei; 1987

Species of gastropod

Juturnia brunei, the Brune's tryonia, Brune's springsnail or Brune spring snail, is a species of very small freshwater snail that has a gill and an operculum, an aquatic gastropod mollusc in the family Hydrobiidae. This species is endemic to the United States (Texas). It was formerly listed as Threatened in 1993/1994 and Data Deficient since 1996 until it was changed to Critically Endangered and possibly extinct in 2012; this is because it is found only in Phantom Lake, Balmorhea Lake, has range of less than 100 km², and was last observed in 1993. A 1991 report by the United States Fish and Wildlife Service also listed it as Endangered and they also later noted the unknown population. It is found in firm substratum and on mud before modification.

Its habitat was impounded in 1946 and still threatened by drought and longtime water abstraction since the 1970s. However, as a helpful measure, a pump was installed to maintain water level but the effects for the snail are unknown. It was last seen in 1993 and may even be extinct and has been listed as such by some publications with further searches not locating this snail. It is also listed as G1 (critically imperiled) by NatureServe. 1987 research listed it as occurring in New Mexico but there is no further and recent informationabout this. In 2014, research published in the Western North American Naturalist moved the snail to the genus Juturnia and noting it had been extinct since 1984 but the IUCN nor other organizations have changed their information.
