= Heleobops carrikeri =

Scientific classification
- Kingdom: Animalia
- Phylum: Mollusca
- Class: Gastropoda
- Subclass: Caenogastropoda
- Order: Littorinimorpha
- Family: Cochliopidae
- Genus: Heleobops
- Species: H. carrikeri

Binomial name
- Heleobops carrikeri Davis & McKee, 1989

Species of gastropod

Heleobops carrikeri is a species of very small aquatic snail, an operculate gastropod mollusc in the family Cochliopidae.

== Description ==
The maximum recorded shell length is 4.52 mm.

== Habitat ==
Minimum recorded depth is 0 m. Maximum recorded depth is 0.3 m.
