= Aphaostracon =

Scientific classification
- Kingdom: Animalia
- Phylum: Mollusca
- Class: Gastropoda
- Subclass: Caenogastropoda
- Order: Littorinimorpha
- Family: Cochliopidae
- Genus: Aphaostracon; F. G. Thompson, 1968

Type species
- *Aphaostracon rhadinus F. G. Thompson, 1968

Genus of gastropods

Aphaostracon is a genus of very small or minute freshwater snails in the family Cochliopidae that have an operculum.

Aphaostracon species are endemic to restricted areas in Florida, often to a single spring or spring run.

== Species ==
This genus includes the following species:

Species
Species	Common name	Range
Aphaostracon asthenes (F. G. Thompson, 1968)	Blue Spring hydrobe	Blue Spring
Aphaostracon chalarogyrum (F. G. Thompson, 1968)	freemouth hydrobe	Magnesia Springs in Alachua County
Aphaostracon hypohyalinum (F. G. Thompson, 1968) (Syn: A. hypohyalina)	Suwannee hydrobe	Suwannee, Santa Fe, and Waccasassa rivers
Aphaostracon monas (Pilsbry, 1899)	Wekiwa hydrobe	Wekiwa Springs
Aphaostracon pachynotum (F. G. Thompson, 1968) (Syn: A. pachynotum)	thick-shelled hydrobe	upper half of St. Johns River
Aphaostracon pycnum (F. G. Thompson, 1968)	dense hydrobe	Alexander Springs, Silver Glen Springs
Aphaostracon rhadinum (F. G. Thompson, 1968)	slough hydrobe	tributaries of lower St. Johns River
Aphaostracon theiocrenetum (F. G. Thompson, 1968) (Syn: A. theiocrenetum)	Clifton Spring hydrobe	Clifton Springs
Aphaostracon xynoelictum (F. G. Thompson, 1968)	Fenney Spring hydrobe	Fenney Spring, in Sumter County

One or more additional Aphaostracon species have been reported from springs in Florida, including Bugg Spring, De Leon Springs, and Green Springs. The snails from the three springs have not described in an authoritative publication, and it is not known if they belong to one, two, or three species.
