= Chorrobius =

Scientific classification
- Kingdom: Animalia
- Phylum: Mollusca
- Class: Gastropoda
- Subclass: Caenogastropoda
- Order: Littorinimorpha
- Family: Cochliopidae
- Genus: Chorrobius; Hershler, Liu & Landye, 2011

Type species
- Chorrobius crassilabrum Hershler, Liu & Landye, 2011

Genus of gastropods

Chorrobius is a genus of very small freshwater snails, aquatic gastropod mollusks in the family Cochliopidae.

== Species ==
Species within the genus Chorrobius include:

- Chorrobius crassilabrum Hershler, Liu & Landye, 2011
