= Coahuilix =

Scientific classification
- Kingdom: Animalia
- Phylum: Mollusca
- Class: Gastropoda
- Subclass: Caenogastropoda
- Order: Littorinimorpha
- Family: Cochliopidae
- Genus: Coahuilix; Taylor, 1966

Genus of gastropods

Coahuilix is a genus of small freshwater snails that have an operculum, aquatic gastropod mollusks in the family Cochliopidae.

== Species ==
Species within the genus Coahuilix include:

- Coahuilix hubbsi Taylor, 1966 Coahuilix de hubbs snail
- Coahuilix landyei Hershler, 1985
