= Eremopyprgus =

Scientific classification
- Kingdom: Animalia
- Phylum: Mollusca
- Class: Gastropoda
- Subclass: Caenogastropoda
- Order: Littorinimorpha
- Family: Cochliopidae
- Genus: Eremopyprgus; Hershler, 1999

Type species
- Eremopyrgus eganensis Hershler, 1999

Genus of gastropods

Eremopyprgus is a genus of very small freshwater snails, aquatic gastropod mollusks in the family Cochliopidae.

== Species ==
Species within the genus Eremopyprgus include:

- Eremopyrgus eganensis Hershler, 1999
- Eremopyrgus elegans Hershler, Liu & Lande, 2002
