= Cochliopa =

Scientific classification
- Domain: Eukaryota
- Kingdom: Animalia
- Phylum: Mollusca
- Class: Gastropoda
- Subclass: Caenogastropoda
- Order: Littorinimorpha
- Family: Cochliopidae
- Genus: Cochliopa; Stimpson, 1865

Genus of gastropods

Cochliopa is a genus of freshwater snails, specifically cave snails, aquatic gastropod mollusks in the family Cochliopidae.

Cochliopa is the type genus of the family Cochliopidae.

This genus is not to be confused with the similar-sounding land snail genus, Cochlicopa.

== Species ==
Species within this genus include:

- Cochliopa lubrica (Müller, 1774)
- Cochliopa perforata Thompson & Hershler, 1991

synonyms:

- Cochliopa texana Pilsbry, 1935 is a synonym for Pyrgulopsis texana (Pilsbry, 1935) - Phantom cave snail
