= Onobops =

Onobops Temporal range: Miocene-Recent

Scientific classification
- Kingdom: Animalia
- Phylum: Mollusca
- Class: Gastropoda
- Subclass: Caenogastropoda
- Order: Littorinimorpha
- Family: Cochliopidae
- Subfamily: Littoridininae
- Genus: Onobops; F. G. Thompson, 1968

Genus of gastropods

Onobops is a genus of very small aquatic snails, operculate gastropod molluscs in the family Cochliopidae.

== Species ==
Species within the genus Onobops include:

- † Onobops bispiralis Wesselingh, Anderson & Kadolsky, 2006 - from Middle Miocene to early Late Miocene of the Pebas Formation
- † Onobops? bisulcatus Wesselingh, Anderson & Kadolsky, 2006 - from late Early Miocene to Middle Miocene of the Pebas Formation
- † Onobops communis Wesselingh, Anderson & Kadolsky, 2006 - from Middle Miocene to early Late Miocene of the Pebas Formation
- Onobops crassus F. G. Thompson, 1968 - type species
- † Onobops elongoides Wesselingh, Anderson & Kadolsky, 2006 - from late Early Miocene to Middle Miocene of the Pebas Formation
- † Onobops? erectus Wesselingh, Anderson & Kadolsky, 2006 - from Middle Miocene to early Late Miocene of the Pebas Formation
- † Onobops? iquitensis Wesselingh, Anderson & Kadolsky, 2006 - from Middle Miocene of the Pebas Formation
- Onobops jacksoni (Bartsch, 1953)
- † Onobops microconvexus Wesselingh, Anderson & Kadolsky, 2006 - from late Middle Miocene to early Middle Miocene of the Pebas Formation
- † Onobops minissimus Wesselingh, Anderson & Kadolsky, 2006 - from late Miocene to early Late Miocene of the Pebas Formation
- † Onobops ventricosus Wesselingh, Anderson & Kadolsky, 2006 - from Middle Miocene to early Late Miocene of the Pebas Formation
