= Texadina =

Scientific classification
- Kingdom: Animalia
- Phylum: Mollusca
- Class: Gastropoda
- Subclass: Caenogastropoda
- Order: Littorinimorpha
- Family: Cochliopidae
- Subfamily: Semisalsinae
- Genus: Texadina; Abbott & Ladd, 1951

Type species
- Littoridina sphinctostoma Abbott & Ladd, 1951

Species
- T. barretti (Morrison, 1965); T. sphinctostoma (Abbott & Ladd, 1951)

Synonyms
- Littoridina (Texadina) Abbott & Ladd, 1951

Genus of gastropods

Texadina is a genus of very small aquatic snails, operculate gastropod mollusks in the family Cochliopidae.

== Species ==
Species within the genus Texadina include:

- Texadina barretti (Morrison, 1965) – United States (Florida, Louisiana, Mississippi, and Texas)
- Texadina sphinctostoma (Abbott & Ladd, 1951) – Mexico and the United States (Alabama, Florida, Louisiana, Mississippi, and Texas)
