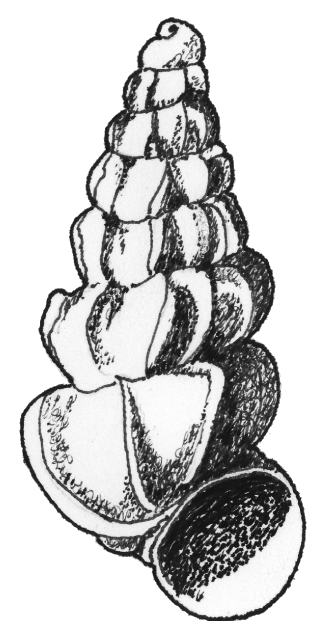
- Drawing of an apertural view of a shell of Paludiscala caramba. The height of the shell is 2.5 mm.

Scientific classification
- Kingdom: Animalia
- Phylum: Mollusca
- Class: Gastropoda
- Subclass: Caenogastropoda
- Order: Littorinimorpha
- Family: Cochliopidae
- Subfamily: Semisalsinae
- Genus: Paludiscala; Taylor, 1966

= Paludiscala =

Genus of molluscs

Paludiscala is a genus of gastropods in the family Cochliopidae.

It contains the following species:

- Paludiscala caramba D. W. Taylor, 1966
- Paludiscala thompsoni Czaja, Estrada-Rodríguez, Romero-Méndez, Ávila-Rodríguez, Meza-Sanchez & Covich, 2017
