= Texadina sphinctostoma =

Scientific classification
- Kingdom: Animalia
- Phylum: Mollusca
- Class: Gastropoda
- Subclass: Caenogastropoda
- Order: Littorinimorpha
- Family: Cochliopidae
- Genus: Texadina
- Species: T. sphinctostoma

Binomial name
- Texadina sphinctostoma (Abbott & Ladd, 1951)

Synonyms
- Littoridina sphinctostoma Abbott & Ladd, 1951; Littoridina (Texadina) sphinctostoma Abbott & Ladd, 1951

Species of gastropod

Texadina sphinctostoma, commonly known as the narrowmouth hydrobe, is a species of very small aquatic snail, an operculate gastropod mollusc in the family Cochliopidae.

== Distribution and habitat ==
Texadina sphinctostoma is known from the brackish waters of eastern Mexico and from Alabama, Florida, Louisiana, Mississippi, and Texas in the United States. It occurs at depths of up to 4 m (13 ft).

== Description ==
The maximum recorded shell length is 3.7 mm.
