= Toyah Creek =

Coordinates: 31°24′46.49″N 103°19′37.61″W

Location
- Country: United States

Physical characteristics
- Source
  - location: Texas

Toyah Creek is a stream in western Texas that flows from Balmorhea to the Pecos River.

== See also ==
- List of rivers of Texas
