= Pseudotryonia =

Scientific classification
- Kingdom: Animalia
- Phylum: Mollusca
- Class: Gastropoda
- Subclass: Caenogastropoda
- Order: Littorinimorpha
- Family: Cochliopidae
- Subfamily: Littoridininae
- Genus: Pseudotryonia; Hershler, 2001

Genus of freshwater snails

Pseudotryonia is a genus of gastropods belonging to the family Cochliopidae.

The species of this genus are found in Northern America.

Species:

- Pseudotryonia adamantina (D.W.Taylor, 1987)
- Pseudotryonia alamosae (D.W.Taylor, 1987)
- Pseudotryonia brevissima (Pilsbry, 1890)
- Pseudotryonia grahamae F.G.Thompson, 2001
- Pseudotryonia mica Hershler, H.-P.Liu & Landye, 2011
- Pseudotryonia pasajae Hershler, H.P.Liu & Landye, 2011
