= Coahuilix de hubbs snail =

Conservation status
- Critically Endangered (IUCN 2.3)

Scientific classification
- Kingdom: Animalia
- Phylum: Mollusca
- Class: Gastropoda
- Subclass: Caenogastropoda
- Order: Littorinimorpha
- Family: Cochliopidae
- Genus: Coahuilix
- Species: C. hubbsi

Binomial name
- Coahuilix hubbsi Taylor, 1966

Species of gastropod

The coahuilix de Hubbs snail, scientific name Coahuilix hubbsi, is a species of small freshwater snails that have an operculum, aquatic gastropod mollusks in the family Hydrobiidae. This species is endemic to Mexico.
