= Sportingoods tryonia =

Conservation status
- Data Deficient (IUCN 2.3)

- Critically Imperiled (NatureServe)

Scientific classification
- Kingdom: Animalia
- Phylum: Mollusca
- Class: Gastropoda
- Subclass: Caenogastropoda
- Order: Littorinimorpha
- Family: Cochliopidae
- Genus: Tryonia
- Species: T. angulata

Binomial name
- Tryonia angulata Hershler & Sada, 1987

Species of freshwater snail

The sportingoods tryonia, scientific name Tryonia angulata, is a species of small freshwater snail with a gill and an operculum, an aquatic gastropod mollusc in the family Hydrobiidae. This species is endemic to the United States.

== Description ==
The shell of this species is about 2.7 to 4.0 millimetres (0.11 to 0.16 in), with a circumference approximately half its height. It has 5.0 to 7.0 whorls and is colorless/transparent.
