= Juturnia =

Scientific classification
- Kingdom: Animalia
- Phylum: Mollusca
- Class: Gastropoda
- Subclass: Caenogastropoda
- Order: Littorinimorpha
- Family: Cochliopidae
- Genus: Juturnia; Hershler, Liu & Stockwell, 2002

Type species
- Durangonella coahuilae Taylor, 1966

Species
- J. brunei (Taylor, 1987); J. coahuilae (Taylor, 1966); J. gracilis Czaja, Covich, Estrada-Rodríguez & Romero-Méndez, 2019; J. kosteri (Taylor, 1987); J. tularosae Hershler, Liu & Stockwell, 2002

Genus of gastropods

Juturnia is a genus of very small freshwater snails, aquatic gastropod mollusks in the family Cochliopidae.

== Species ==
This genus includes the following species:

- Juturnia brunei (Taylor, 1987)
- Juturnia coahuilae (Taylor, 1966)
- Juturnia gracilis Czaja, Covich, Estrada-Rodríguez & Romero-Méndez, 2019
- Juturnia kosteri (Taylor, 1987)
- Juturnia tularosae Hershler, Liu & Stockwell, 2002
