= Spurwinkia =

Scientific classification
- Kingdom: Animalia
- Phylum: Mollusca
- Class: Gastropoda
- Subclass: Caenogastropoda
- Order: Littorinimorpha
- Family: Cochliopidae
- Genus: Spurwinkia; Davis, Mazurkiewicz & Mandracchia, 1982

Genus of gastropods

Spurwinkia is a genus of very small aquatic snails, operculate gastropod mollusks in the family Cochliopidae.

== Species ==
Species within the genus Spurwinkia include:

- Spurwinkia salsa (Pilsbry, 1905)
