= Heleobia castellanosae =

Scientific classification
- Kingdom: Animalia
- Phylum: Mollusca
- Class: Gastropoda
- Subclass: Caenogastropoda
- Order: Littorinimorpha
- Family: Cochliopidae
- Genus: Heleobia
- Species: H. castellanosae

Binomial name
- Heleobia castellanosae (Gaillard, 1974)

Synonyms
- Littoridina castellanosae Gaillard, 1974

Species of gastropod

Heleobia castellanosae is a species of small freshwater snail, an operculate gastropod mollusc in the family Cochliopidae.

The specific name castellanosae is in honour of Argentinian malacologist Zulma Judith Ageitos de Castellanos.

== Distribution ==
Argentina.

== Ecology ==
Parasites of Heleobia castellanosae include trematodes Lobatostoma jungwirthi and Lobatostoma pacificum.
