= Heleobops docimus =

Conservation status
- Least Concern (IUCN 3.1)

- Apparently Secure (NatureServe)

Scientific classification
- Kingdom: Animalia
- Phylum: Mollusca
- Class: Gastropoda
- Subclass: Caenogastropoda
- Order: Littorinimorpha
- Family: Cochliopidae
- Genus: Heleobops
- Species: H. docimus

Binomial name
- Heleobops docimus Thompson, 1968

Synonyms
- Heleobops clytus Thompson & Hershler, 1991; Heleobops docima Thompson, 1968

Species of gastropod

Heleobops docimus, commonly known as the oolite hydrobe, is a species of very small aquatic snail, an operculate gastropod mollusc in the family Cochliopidae.

== Description ==
The maximum recorded shell length is 5.1 mm.
