= Lithococcus =

Scientific classification
- Kingdom: Animalia
- Phylum: Mollusca
- Class: Gastropoda
- Subclass: Caenogastropoda
- Order: Littorinimorpha
- Family: Cochliopidae
- Genus: Lithococcus; Pilsbry, 1911

Type species
- Lithoglyphus multicarinatus Miller, 1878

Genus of gastropods

Lithococcus is a genus of very small freshwater snails, aquatic gastropod mollusks in the family Cochliopidae.

== Characteristics ==
(Original description) The shell is globose and thick, with four to five convex whorls. Its sculpture consists of strongly developed spiral ribs, with the upper ribs being spinose (spiny).

The operculum is corneous and subcircular, composed of three or four whorls with the nucleus located near the center.

The dentition is amnicoloid (characteristic of the family Amnicolidae). The central tooth has five to seven denticles on its cusp and three basal denticles on each side. The inner lateral tooth has 13-14 denticles, and the next lateral tooth has about 16 denticles.

== Distribution ==
The species occurs in the Pacific Ocean off Mexico, Costa Rica and Ecuador.

== Species ==
Species within the genus Lithococcus include:

- Lithococcus aletes Thompson & Hershler, 1991
- † Lithococcus amazonicus Wesselingh, 2006
- † Lithococcus carinatus Wesselingh, 2006
- Lithococcus multicarinatus (Miller, 1878)
- Lithococcus venustus Pilsbry, 1950
