= Mesobia =

Scientific classification
- Kingdom: Animalia
- Phylum: Mollusca
- Class: Gastropoda
- Subclass: Caenogastropoda
- Order: Littorinimorpha
- Family: Cochliopidae
- Genus: Mesobia; Thompson & Hershler, 1991

Type species
- Mesobia pristina Thompson & Hershler, 1991

Genus of gastropods

Mesobia is a genus of very small freshwater snails, aquatic gastropod mollusks in the family Cochliopidae.

== Species ==
Species within the genus Mesobia include:

- Mesobia pristina Thompson & Hershler, 1991
