= Grated tryonia =

Conservation status
- Data Deficient (IUCN 2.3)

- Imperiled (NatureServe)

Scientific classification
- Kingdom: Animalia
- Phylum: Mollusca
- Class: Gastropoda
- Subclass: Caenogastropoda
- Order: Littorinimorpha
- Family: Cochliopidae
- Genus: Tryonia
- Species: T. clathrata

Binomial name
- Tryonia clathrata Stimpson, 1865

Synonyms
- Tryonia paludestrina Stimpson, 1865

Species of gastropod

The grated tryonia, also known as the White River snail, scientific name Tryonia clathrata, is a species of very small or minute freshwater snail with an operculum, an aquatic gastropod mollusc in the family Cochliopidae. This species is endemic to the United States.
