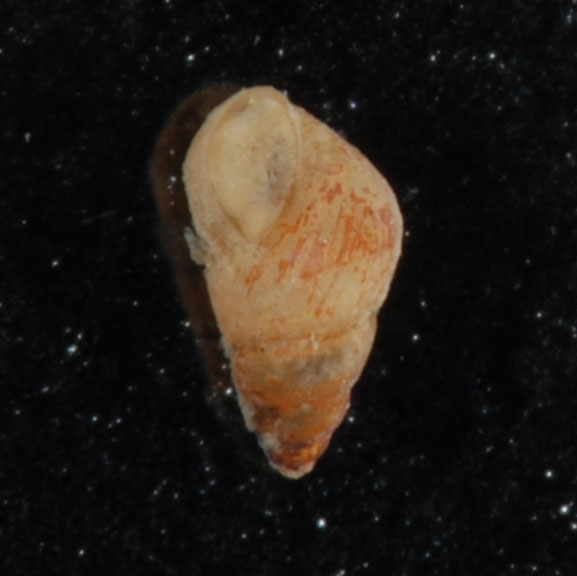
- Littoridinops monroensis

Scientific classification
- Kingdom: Animalia
- Phylum: Mollusca
- Class: Gastropoda
- Subclass: Caenogastropoda
- Order: Littorinimorpha
- Family: Hydrobiidae
- Genus: Littoridinops; Pilsbry, 1952

= Littoridinops =

Genus of gastropods

Littoridinops is a genus of very small aquatic snails, operculate gastropod mollusks in the family Hydrobiidae.

== Species ==
Species within the genus Littoridinops include:

- Littoridinops monroensis (Frauenfeld, 1863)
- Littoridinops palustris F. G. Thompson, 1968
- Littoridinops tenuipes (Couper, 1844)
