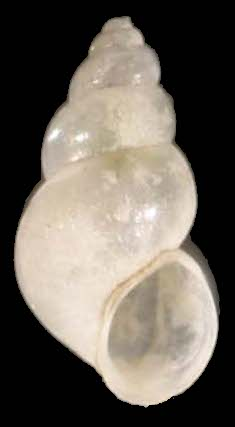
- Apertural view of the shell of Eupaludestrina stagnorum.

Scientific classification
- Kingdom: Animalia
- Phylum: Mollusca
- Class: Gastropoda
- Subclass: Caenogastropoda
- Order: Littorinimorpha
- Family: Cochliopidae
- Genus: Eupaludestrina
- Species: E. stagnorum

Binomial name
- Eupaludestrina stagnorum (Gmelin, 1791)

Synonyms
- Heleobia (Semisalsa) stagnorum (Gmelin, 1791) (Semisalsa has genus level); Heleobia stagnorum (Gmelin, 1791); Helix stagnorum Gmelin, 1791; Hydrobia scamandri Boeters, Monod & Vala, 1977; † Hydrobia stagnalis (Baster, 1765); † Hydrobia stagnalis stagnalis (Baster, 1765); Hydrobia stagnorum (Gmelin, 1791); Paludestrina bigugliana Caziot, 1908; Semisalsa graeca Radoman, 1974; Semisalsa rausiana Radoman, 1974; Semisalsa scamandri (Boeters, Monod & Vala, 1977); Semisalsa stagnorum (Gmelin, 1791)

= Eupaludestrina stagnorum =

Species of gastropod

Eupaludestrina stagnorum is a species of small brackish water snail with a gill and an operculum, an aquatic gastropod mollusk in the family Cochliopidae.

== Distribution ==
This species occurs in the Mediterranean Sea, the Baltic Sea, the North Sea and the North Atlantic Ocean.
