= Minckleyella =

Scientific classification
- Kingdom: Animalia
- Phylum: Mollusca
- Class: Gastropoda
- Subclass: Caenogastropoda
- Order: Littorinimorpha
- Family: Cochliopidae
- Genus: Minckleyella; Hershler, H.-P.Liu & Landye, 2011
- Species: M. balnearis

Binomial name
- Minckleyella balnearis Hershler, H.-P.Liu & Landye, 2011

Genus of freshwater snails

Minckleyella is a monotypic genus of gastropods belonging to the family Cochliopidae. The only species is Minckleyella balnearis.

This freshwater snail genus is named in honor of Wendell L. Minckley.

The species is found in the Chihuahuan Desert of northern Mexico.
