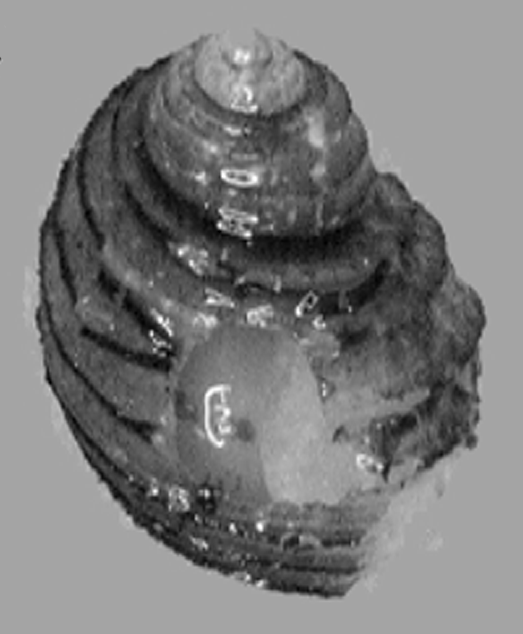
- Lateral view of a damaged shell of Mexithauma quadripaludium

Scientific classification
- Kingdom: Animalia
- Phylum: Mollusca
- Class: Gastropoda
- Subclass: Caenogastropoda
- Order: Littorinimorpha
- Family: Cochliopidae
- Genus: Mexithauma; D. W. Taylor, 1966
- Species: M. quadripaludium

Binomial name
- Mexithauma quadripaludium D. W. Taylor, 1966

= Mexithauma =

Species of gastropod

Mexithauma quadripaludium is a species of freshwater snail, an aquatic gastropod mollusc in the family Cochliopidae. It is the only species in the genus Mexithauma.

== Distribution ==
This species is endemic to Cuatro Ciénegas valley, in the Chihuahuan Desert, Mexico.

== Ecology ==
Predators of Mexithauma quadripaludium include the cichlid fish Herichthys minckleyi.
