= Hubbs House =

United States historic place in Kingman, Arizona

- U.S. National Register of Historic Places
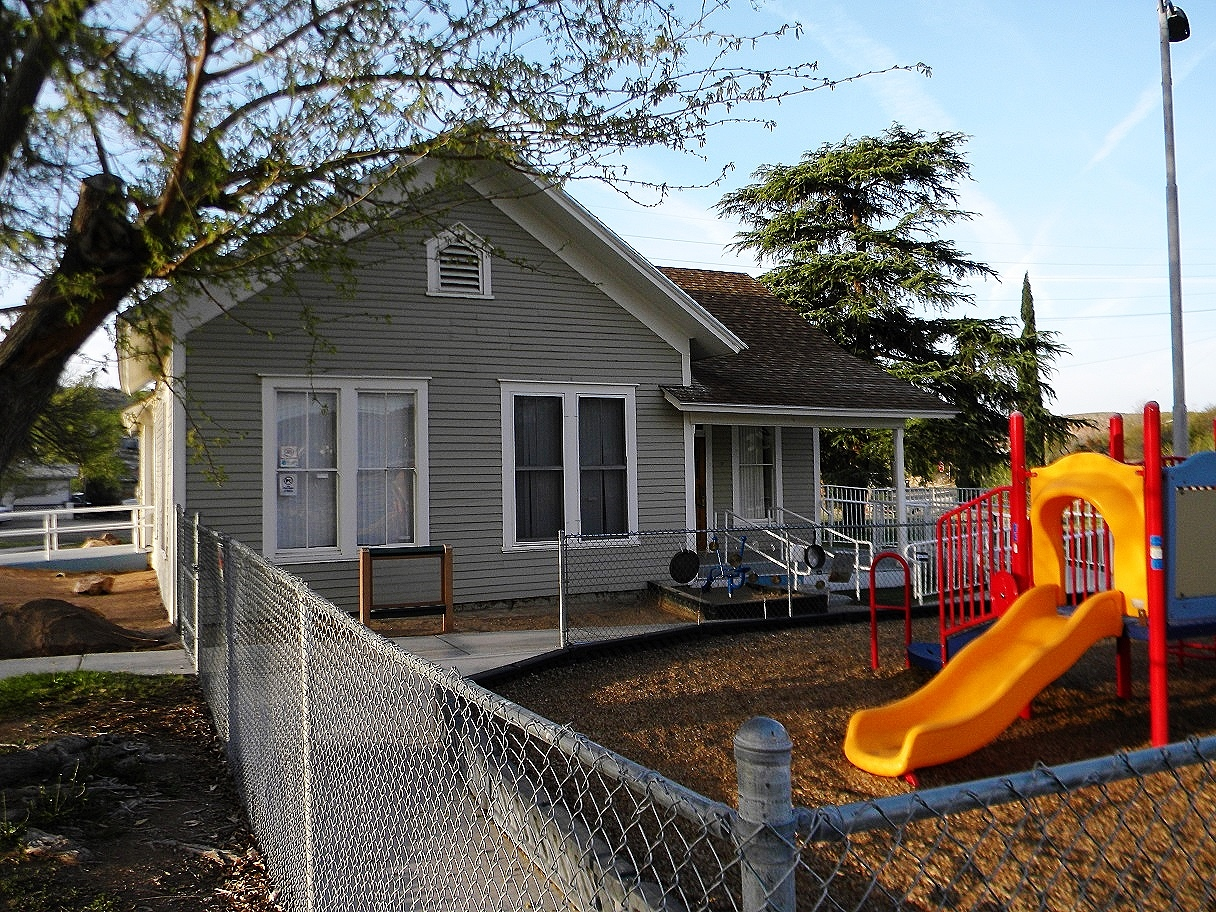

- Location within Arizona Location within the United States
- Location: Kingman, Arizona
- Coordinates: 35°11′8″N 114°3′7″W
- Built: 1891
- Architect: Harvey Hubbs
- MPS: Kingman MRA (AD)
- NRHP reference No.: 78000554
- Added to NRHP: June 15, 1978

Hubbs House is Queen Anne style built in 1893 at 4th and Golconda Streets in Kingman, Arizona. The house has been on the National Register of Historic Places since 1978. Its historic status was reviewed as part of a 1985 study of 63 historic resources in Kingman that led to many others being listed.

The home today is owned by the City of Kingman and is used by Head Start.

== Description and construction ==
The house is an early adobe construction, made of adobe with clapboard siding. Harvey Hubbs most likely designed the home, John Mulligan & William Aitken were the contractors.

== Hubbs Family ==
Tulare County, California. He stopped in Kingman for the night and his horse either disappeared or was stolen along with all of his belongings. Forced to stay, he got a job being a teamster for the mines. Prior to this, Johanna Wilkinson was living in Los Angeles where she received a letter from her brother Tobi who was working on a crew building the railroad in what would be the Kingman area. He told her that the railroad workers had little to eat and if she came there and cooked for them, she could make some good money. Johanna enlisted the help of her sister Francis, hired a teamster to haul supplies, and moved to the site of where the railroad was being built. There, they set up a tent and with a cast iron stove, began cooking for the railroad workers. Their business extended to miners who came to share the good food and this led to Johanna and Francis setting up another tent with cots that the miners and railroad workers paid them to sleep in. About this time, Harvey met Johanna probably while eating in her ten restaurant. After Harvey and Johanna married in 1887, they constructed Kingman's first hotel, the Hubbs House. It caught fire nine times and burned down two times including the Kingman Fire of 1898. Many of the fires were caused by miners and workers smoking opium in the hotel rooms. Opium could be bought over the counter at that time. Water had to be brought into Kingman from at a spring over two miles away or from Peach Springs which was 50 miles away so there was never water to fight the fires. Each time the Hubbs rebuilt their hotel. The second Hubbs House Hotel was Kingman's first two-story building. After the total destruction of this hotel, he built the Hotel Beale. He was also offered a partnership in building the Brunswick Hotel next door, but declined not feeling comfortable with the other business partners. The Hotel Beale still stands in Kingman although it is in disrepair. It is presumably on the site where Johanna and her sister first erected their tents. The Hotel Beale was considered Kingman's most luxurious hotel. In 1906, Harvey sold the hotel to the Devine family whose son, Andy Devine, was a famous movie star from 1920 to 1950. The Hotel Beale closed in the early years of the depression, then re-opened from 1936 to 1942. Interstate 40 was constructed bypassing Kingman and Route 66 and the hotel closed again. Harvey and Johanna Hubbs are somewhat forgotten pioneers of Kingman having played a major role in its development. Harvey served as Mohave County Sheriff and as a county commissioner and county treasurer. He co-owned the Mohave Miner newspaper and helped bring about Kingman's first water system. His home was the first home in Kingman built in the Queen Ann style and was the first home in Kingman to have running water. It has been restored and is listed on the National Register of Historic Places.
