= Balmorhea Lake =

Irrigation reservoir in Reeves County, Texas, US

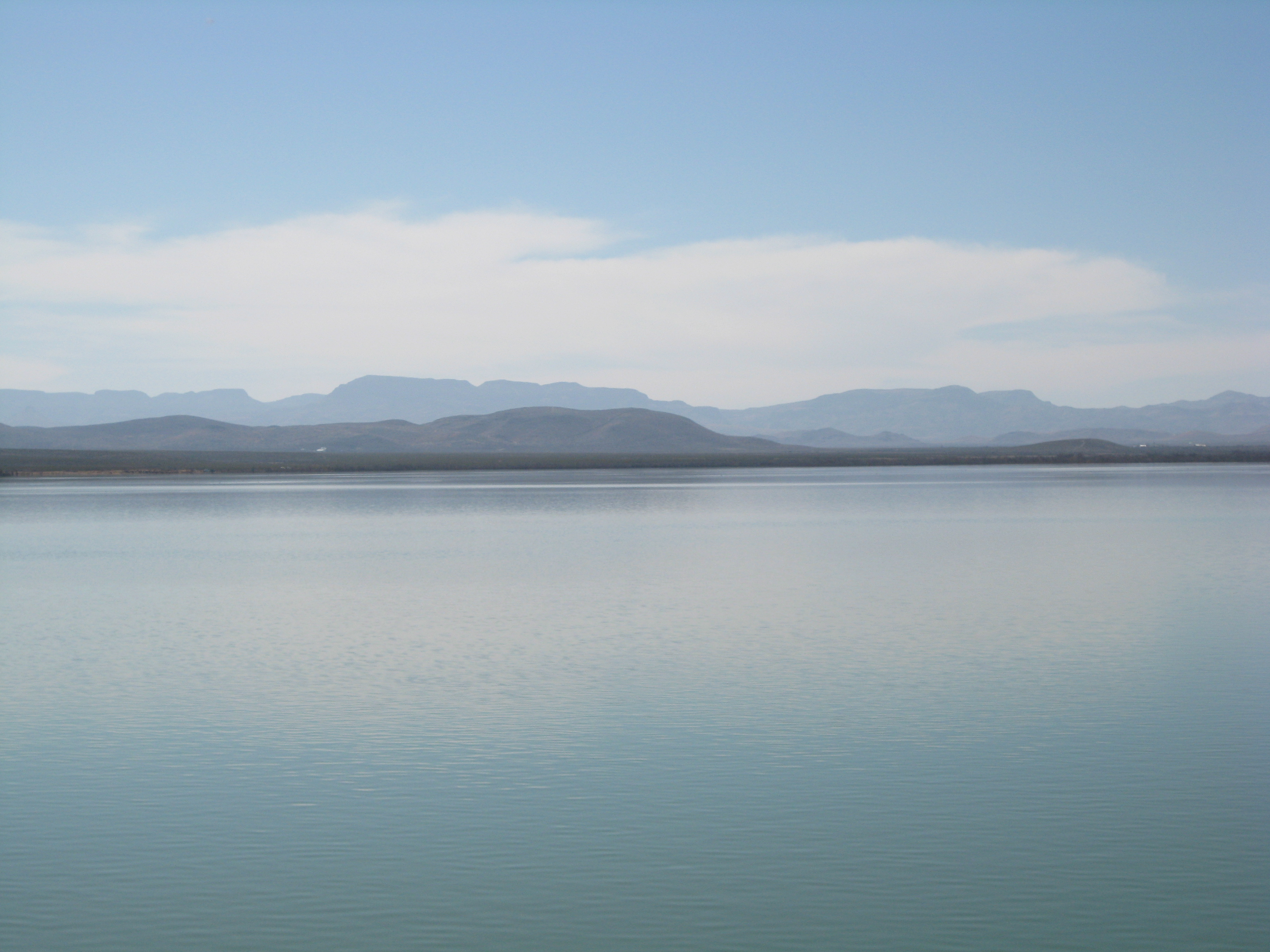

- Location within Texas Location within the United States
- Location: Reeves County, Texas
- Coordinates: 30°57.77′N 103°43.25′W
- Type: Irrigation reservoir
- Primary inflows: Sandia Creek, Toyah Creek
- Primary outflows: Sandia Creek
- Basin countries: United States
- Surface area: 556 acres (225 ha)
- Max. depth: 25 ft (7.6 m)
- Water volume: 6,350 acre⋅ft (0.00783 km^{3})
- Surface elevation: 3,187 ft (971 m)

== Background ==
Balmorhea Lake is a reservoir on Sandia Creek 2 miles (3.2 km) southeast of downtown Balmorhea, Texas. Water from Toyah Creek, fed by the nearby San Solomon Springs, is also fed into the reservoir, as is excess water in the Phantom Lake Canal. Historians believe that people have used springs in this area for more than 11,000 years. The reservoir was built in 1917 by the construction of a dam by the Reeves County Water Improvement District. The reservoir provides water for irrigation, and is a popular recreational spot for locals. Balmorhea Lake is also known as Lower Parks Reservoir.

== Flora ==
Balmorhea Lake is home to many species of Bulrush and Sago Pondweed. The Bulrush, Scirpus acutus, is a marshland plant that is typically grown around bodies of water like: lakes, ponds and even reservoirs. These plants grow their stems horizontally while sprouting roots underneath their stems, this is known as rhizomatous activity. Because these plants are rhizomatous, they produce a substance in the ground that allows bacteria to keep waste from damaging the shoreline and vegetation near it. These plants are usually found in areas of shallow waters as they do not live very long in waters that are considerably deep. They may typically grow more than 2.5 metres (8 ft 2 in) long. They are green in color, but are sometimes seen as having a grey tint. The Bulrush plants are utilized often for conservation efforts for many different lakes and reservoirs because of their ability to preserve shorelines that would otherwise be worn down by waves.

The Sago Pondweed, Stuckenia pectinata, is very common across North America. These plants are typically consumed by ducks, geese and other birds that reside on lakes, reservoirs and other similar bodies of water. Like the Bulrush mentioned above, the Sago Pondweed does offer environmental assistance by preventing erosion on the shorelines caused by waves and having the ability to regulate the amount of pollution in these bodies of water. These plant may grow to be more than 2.5 feet (0.76 m) tall and are very grass-like, having a brownish-green tint to them.

== Fishing ==
Balmorhea Lake has been stocked with species of fish intended to improve the utility of the reservoir for recreational fishing. Fish that are present in Balmorhea Lake include largemouth bass, sunfish, European carp, mirror carp, channel catfish, blue catfish, black bullhead, crappie and gizzard shad.

Although recreational fishing is allowed, there are statewide regulations that this lake has to follow.

== Recreational uses ==
Balmorhea Lake is used for swimming, fishing, bird-watching, and boating.
