= Pseudotryonia adamantina =

Conservation status
- Data Deficient (IUCN 2.3)

- Critically Imperiled (NatureServe)

Scientific classification
- Kingdom: Animalia
- Phylum: Mollusca
- Class: Gastropoda
- Subclass: Caenogastropoda
- Order: Littorinimorpha
- Family: Cochliopidae
- Genus: Pseudotryonia
- Species: P. adamantina

Binomial name
- Pseudotryonia adamantina (Taylor, 1987)

Synonyms
- Tryonia (Paupertryonia) adamantia Taylor, 1987; Tryonia (Paupertryonia) adamantina Taylor, 1987

Species of gastropod

Pseudotryonia adamantina, commonly known as the Diamond tryonia or Diamond Y springsnail, is a species of small freshwater snail with a gill and an operculum, an aquatic gastropod mollusk in the family Cochliopidae.

The species is endemic to the United States. The common name is a reference to the Diamond Y Spring which is on the Diamond Y Spring Preserve in West Texas, a cienaga system.
