= Littoridinops tenuipes =

Conservation status
- Secure (NatureServe)

Scientific classification
- Kingdom: Animalia
- Phylum: Mollusca
- Class: Gastropoda
- Subclass: Caenogastropoda
- Order: Littorinimorpha
- Family: Hydrobiidae
- Genus: Littoridinops
- Species: L. tenuipes

Binomial name
- Littoridinops tenuipes (Couper, 1844)

Synonyms
- Amnicola tenuipes Couper, 1844; Littoridina tenuipes (Couper, 1844)

Species of gastropod

Littoridinops tenuipes, common name the henscomb hydrobe, is a species of very small aquatic snail, an operculate gastropod mollusk in the family Hydrobiidae.

== Description ==
The maximum recorded shell length is 6 mm.

== Habitat ==
Minimum recorded depth is 0 m. Maximum recorded depth is 0 m.
