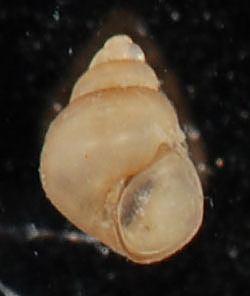

Conservation status
- Secure (NatureServe)

Scientific classification
- Kingdom: Animalia
- Phylum: Mollusca
- Class: Gastropoda
- Subclass: Caenogastropoda
- Order: Littorinimorpha
- Family: Hydrobiidae
- Genus: Littoridinops
- Species: L. monroensis

Binomial name
- Littoridinops monroensis (von Frauenfeld, 1863)

Synonyms
- Amnicola forsythi Pilsbry, 1930; Amnicola oscitans Pilsbry, 1930; Amnicola sablensis Pilsbry, 1951; Hydrobia monroensis von Frauenfeld, 1863; Littoridina monroensis (von Frauenfeld, 1863)

= Littoridinops monroensis =

Species of gastropod

Littoridinops monroensis is a species of very small aquatic snail, an operculate gastropod mollusk in the family Hydrobiidae.

== Description ==
The maximum recorded shell length is 4.5 mm.

== Habitat ==
Minimum recorded depth is 0 m. Maximum recorded depth is 0.3 m.
