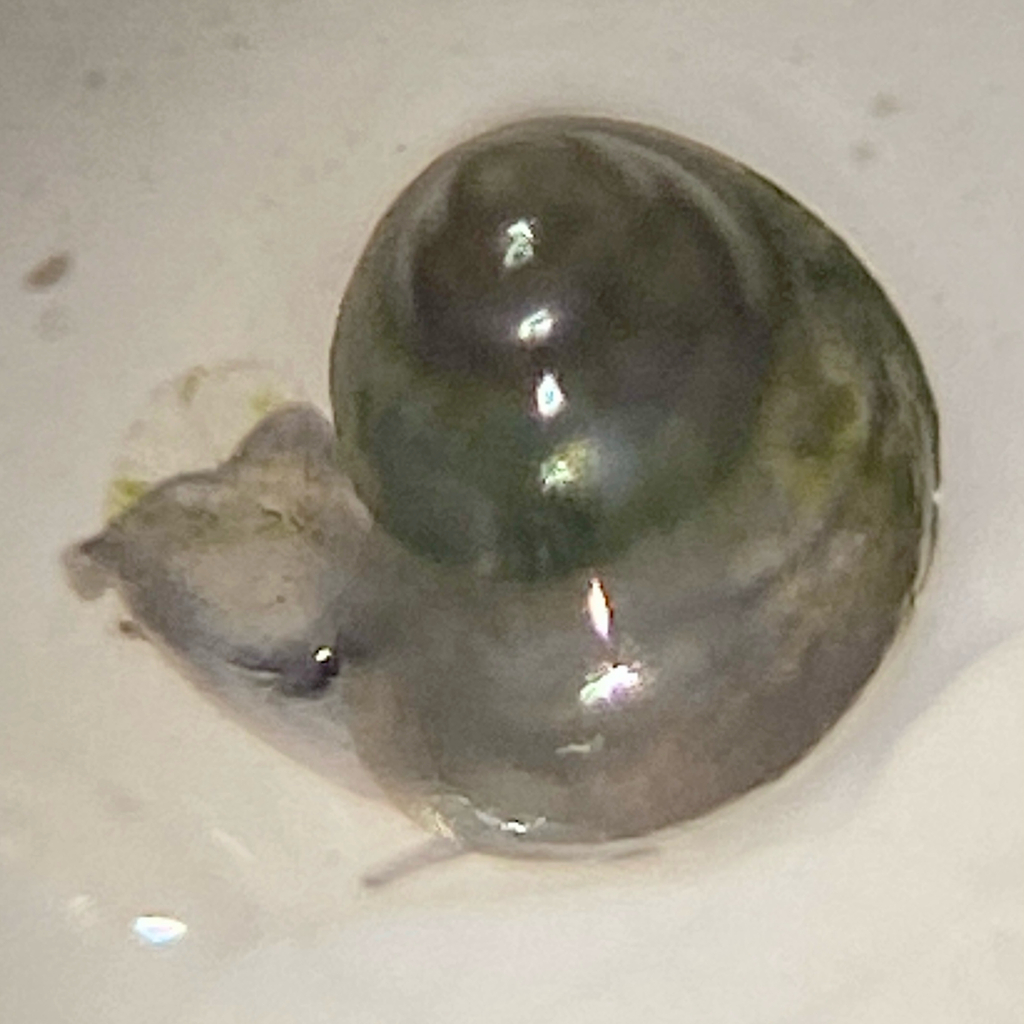
- Microscopic photo of Koster's springsnail

Conservation status
- Data Deficient (IUCN 2.3)

- Imperiled (NatureServe)

Scientific classification
- Kingdom: Animalia
- Phylum: Mollusca
- Class: Gastropoda
- Subclass: Caenogastropoda
- Order: Littorinimorpha
- Family: Cochliopidae
- Genus: Juturnia
- Species: J. kosteri

Binomial name
- Juturnia kosteri (Taylor, 1987)

Synonyms
- Tryonia (Paupertryonia) kosteri Taylor, 1987; Durangonella kosteri (Taylor, 1987)

= Juturnia kosteri =

Species of gastropod

Juturnia kosteri, commonly known as Koster's springsnail or Koster's tryonia, is a species of small freshwater snail with a gill and an operculum, an aquatic gastropod mollusc in the family Cochliopidae.

== Distribution ==
This species is endemic to New Mexico in the United States.
