= Balmorhea Independent School District =

School district in Texas, US

Location
- 608 W First St. Balmorhea, Texas ESC Region 18 USA
- Coordinates: 30°59′0.01″N 103°44′46.1″W

District information
- Type: Independent school district
- Grades: Pre-K through 12
- Superintendent: John Massey
- Schools: 1 (2009-10)
- NCES District ID: 4809330

Students and staff
- Students: 159 (2010-11)
- Teachers: 20.11 (2009-10) (on full-time equivalent (FTE) basis)
- Student–teacher ratio: 7.91 (2009-10)
- Athletic conference: UIL Class 1A 6-man Football Division I
- District mascot: Bears
- Colors: Royal Blue, Black, White

Other information
- TEA District Accountability Rating for 2011-12: Recognized
- Website: Balmorhea ISD

The Balmorhea Independent School District is a public school district based in Balmorhea, Texas. The district operates one K-12 school, Balmorhea School.

The district includes Balmorhea and some surrounding unincorporated areas.

== Finances ==
As of the 2010–2011 school year, the appraised valuation of property in the district was $29,078,000. The maintenance tax rate was $0.117 and the bond tax rate was $0.001 per $100 of appraised valuation.

== Academic achievement ==
In 2011, the school district was rated "recognized" by the Texas Education Agency. thirty-five percent of districts in Texas in 2011 received the same rating. No state accountability ratings will be given to districts in 2012. A school district in Texas can receive one of four possible rankings from the Texas Education Agency: Exemplary (the highest possible ranking), Recognized, Academically Acceptable, and Academically Unacceptable (the lowest possible ranking).

Historical district TEA accountability ratings

- 2011: Recognized
- 2010: Exemplary
- 2009: Exemplary
- 2008: Recognized
- 2007: Recognized
- 2006: Recognized
- 2005: Academically Acceptable
- 2004: Recognized

== Schools ==
During the 2011–2012 school year, the district had one school that served students in grades pre-kindergarten through twelve. The school was a 2004 National Blue Ribbon School.

== Special programs ==
=== Athletics ===
Balmorhea High School participates in the boys sports of basketball, 6-man football, tennis and track. The school participates in the girls sports of basketball and volleyball.

In 2016, the Balmorhea Bears football team made it all the way to the 6-man Class 1A Division II championship game, where they suffered their only loss of the season, a 96–50 defeat at the hands of Richland Springs. They would lose again in the 2017 title game, but would finally win in 2020 avenging their earlier loss to Richland Springs.

== See also ==
- List of school districts in Texas
- List of high schools in Texas
