= James Ferriss =

American politician and amateur conchologist

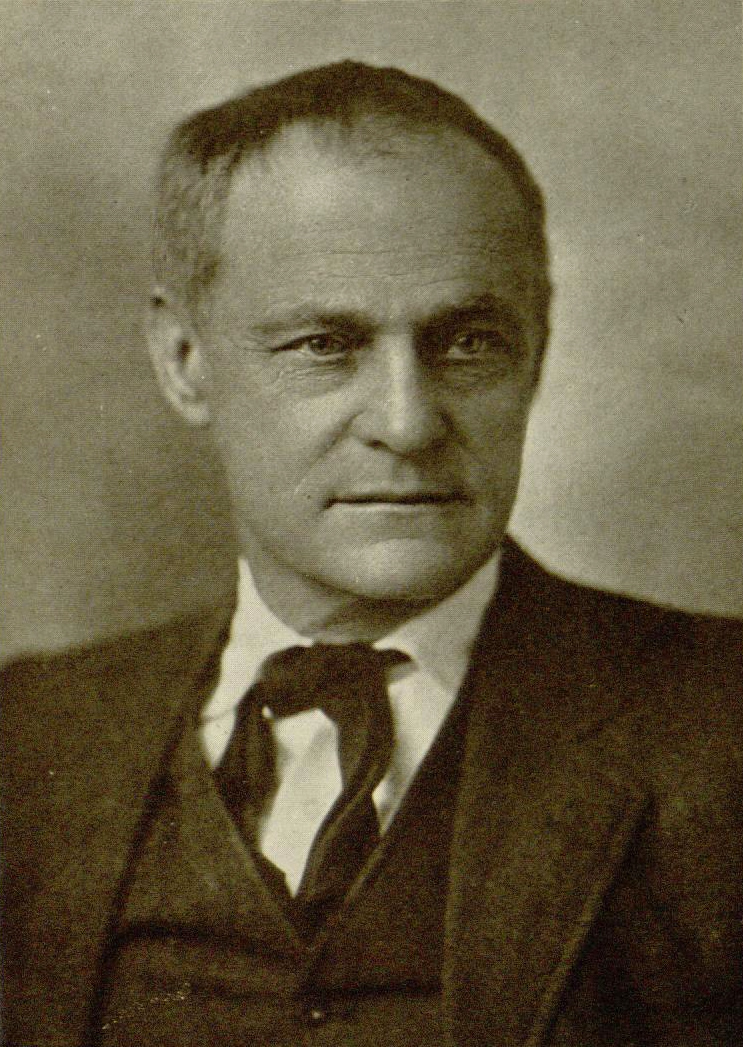
J. H. Ferriss

James Henry Ferriss (November 18, 1849 – March 17, 1926) was an American politician and amateur conchologist. According to Henry Augustus Pilsbry, Ferriss was "the fore-most of American landshell collectors... as a collector he has probably never been surpassed."

== Biography ==
James H. Ferriss was born November 18, 1849, in Kendall Township, Kendall County, Illinois, Ferriss moved to southeastern Kansas in 1869 to stake a claim as a farmer, freighter, and storekeeper. He returned to Illinois in 1872 to work as a reporter and editor of several newspapers in Joliet, Illinois.

A fiery prohibitionist, he purchased and edited the Joliet News in 1877 but was jailed that year for an editorial which offended a local political boss. He moved to Maine after the incident, but returned in 1882 to edit the Joliet News until 1915. He was elected National Chairman of the People's Party in 1904.

Ferriss died at the age of 76 on March 17, 1926.

== Works ==
- * "The Populist View," in "Lessons of the Election: A Symposium," To-Morrow: A Monthly Hand-Book of the Changing Order, vol. 1, no. 1 (January 1905), pp. 36–38.
- Pilsbry H. A. & Ferris J. H. (1906). "Mollusca of Southern States. II". Proceedings of the Academy of Natural Sciences of Philadelphia 58: 123-175.
- Pilsbry H. A. & Ferriss J. H. 1907. Mollusca of the Ozarkian Fauna. Proc. Acad. Nat. Sci. Philadelphia 58: 529–567.
- Pilsbry H. A. & Ferriss J. H. 1910. Mollusca of the Southwestern States, III: The Huachuca Mountains, Arizona. Proc. Acad. Nat. Sci. Philadelphia 61: 495–516.
- Pilsbry H. A. & Ferriss J. H. 1910. Mollusca of the Southwestern States: IV. The Chiricahua Mountains, Arizona. Proc. Acad. Nat. Sci. Philadelphia 62: 44–147.
- Pilsbry H. A. & Ferriss J. H. 1915. Mollusca of the Southwestern States VII: The Dragoon, Mule, Santa Rita, Baboquivari, and Tucson Ranges, Arizona. Proc. Acad. Nat. Sci. Philadelphia 68: 363–418.
- Pilsbry H. A. & Ferriss J. H. 1917. Mollusca of the Southwestern States VIII: The Black Range, New Mexico. Proc. Acad. Nat. Sci. Philadelphia 69: 83–107.
- Pilsbry H. A. & Ferriss J. H. 1919. Mollusca of the Southwestern States IX: The Santa Catalina, Rincon, Tortolita and Galiuro Mountains. X. The mountains of the Gila headwaters. Proc. Acad. Nat. Sci. Philadelphia 70: 282–333.
- Pilsbry H. A. & Ferriss J. H. 1923. Mollusca of the Southwestern States, XI - From the Tucson Range to Ajo, and mountain ranges between the San Padro and Santa Cruz rivers, Arizona. Proc. Acad. Nat. Sci. Philadelphia 75: 47–103.
