= Balmorhea, Texas =

City in the United States

- City
- Interactive map of Balmorhea, Texas
- Coordinates: 30°59′2″N 103°44′32″W
- Country: United States
- State: Texas
- County: Reeves

Area
  - Total: 0.39 sq mi (1.00 km^{2})
  - Land: 0.39 sq mi (1.00 km^{2})
  - Water: 0 sq mi (0.00 km^{2})
- Elevation: 3,196 ft (974 m)

Population (2020)
  - Total: 408
  - Density: 1,060/sq mi (408/km^{2})
- Time zone: UTC-6 (Central (CST))
  - Summer (DST): UTC-5 (CDT)
- ZIP code: 79718
- Area code: 432
- FIPS code: 48-05468
- GNIS feature ID: 1351473
- Website: cityofbalmorhea.myruralwater.com

Balmorhea (/ˌbælməˈreɪ/ BAL-mər-AY) is a city in Reeves County, in the U.S. state of Texas. The population was 408 as of the 2020 census.

== History ==
Balmorhea was platted in 1906. Its founders were Ernest D. Balcom, H. R. Morrow, and John and Joe Rhea; the town's name is an amalgamation of their surnames.

== Geography ==
Balmorhea is located at 30°59′2″N 103°44′32″W (30.983894, –103.742292).

According to the United States Census Bureau, the city has a total area of 0.4 square miles (1.0 km^{2}), all land. Just outside the town, Balmorhea Lake provides irrigation water for the local communities.

== Demographics ==
Historical population
Census	Pop.	Note	%±
1960	604		—
1970	655		8.4%
1980	568		−13.3%
1990	765		34.7%
2000	527		−31.1%
2010	479		−9.1%
2020	408		−14.8%

=== 2020 census ===
As of the 2020 census, Balmorhea had a population of 408 and 138 families residing in the city; the median age was 42.4 years.

25.2% of residents were under the age of 18 and 21.1% of residents were 65 years of age or older. For every 100 females there were 89.8 males, and for every 100 females age 18 and over there were 86.0 males age 18 and over.

There were 153 households in Balmorhea, of which 38.6% had children under the age of 18 living in them. Of all households, 51.0% were married-couple households, 11.1% were households with a male householder and no spouse or partner present, and 28.8% were households with a female householder and no spouse or partner present. About 17.0% of all households were made up of individuals and 8.5% had someone living alone who was 65 years of age or older.

There were 200 housing units, of which 23.5% were vacant. Among occupied housing units, 69.3% were owner-occupied and 30.7% were renter-occupied. The homeowner vacancy rate was <0.1% and the rental vacancy rate was 17.5%.

0% of residents lived in urban areas, while 100.0% lived in rural areas.

Racial composition as of the 2020 census
Race	Percent
White	34.3%
Black or African American	0%
American Indian and Alaska Native	0.7%
Asian	0.5%
Native Hawaiian and Other Pacific Islander	0.2%
Some other race	20.8%
Two or more races	43.4%
Hispanic or Latino (of any race)	84.8%

Balmorhea racial composition (NH = Non-Hispanic) (Note: Note: the US Census treats Hispanic/Latino as an ethnic category. This table excludes Latinos from the racial categories and assigns them to a separate category. Hispanics/Latinos can be of any race.)
Race	Number	Percentage
White (NH)	53	12.99%
Asian (NH)	2	0.49%
Pacific Islander (NH)	1	0.25%
Some Other Race (NH)	1	0.25%
Mixed/Multi-Racial (NH)	5	1.23%
Hispanic or Latino	346	84.8%
Total	408	

=== 2000 census ===
As of the census of 2000, there were 527 people, 179 households, and 139 families residing in the city. The population density was 1,359.6 inhabitants per square mile (524.9/km^{2}). There were 242 housing units at an average density of 624.3 per square mile (241.0/km^{2}). The racial makeup of the city was 58.82% White, 29.41% from other races, and 11.76% from two or more races. Hispanic or Latino of any race were 87.10% of the population.

There were 179 households, out of which 45.8% had children under the age of 18 living with them, 59.8% were married couples living together, 14.5% had a female householder with no husband present, and 22.3% were non-families. 21.8% of all households were made up of individuals, and 10.1% had someone living alone who was 65 years of age or older. The average household size was 2.94 and the average family size was 3.50.

In the city, the population was spread out, with 36.4% under the age of 18, 8.2% from 18 to 24, 25.6% from 25 to 44, 18.2% from 45 to 64, and 11.6% who were 65 years of age or older. The median age was 29 years. For every 100 females, there were 97.4 males. For every 100 females age 18 and over, there were 86.1 males.

The median income for a household in the city was $16,071, and the median income for a family was $20,179. Males had a median income of $19,271 versus $13,958 for females. The per capita income for the city was $7,742. About 32.4% of families and 36.3% of the population were below the poverty line, including 42.0% of those under age 18 and 21.3% of those age 65 or over.

== Education ==
The City of Balmorhea is served by the Balmorhea Independent School District. The superintendent is John Massey, and the principal is Gary Laramore.

== Post Office ==
Balmorhea Post Office 115 North Fort Worth Street, Balmorhea, Texas 79718–9998

== Climate ==
According to the Köppen Climate Classification system, Balmorhea has a semi-arid climate, abbreviated "BSh" on climate maps.

Climate data for Balmorhea, Texas (1991–2020 normals, extremes 1923–present)
Month	Jan	Feb	Mar	Apr	May	Jun	Jul	Aug	Sep	Oct	Nov	Dec	Year
Record high °F (°C)	89 (32)	92 (33)	101 (38)	103 (39)	108 (42)	112 (44)	111 (44)	110 (43)	109 (43)	101 (38)	96 (36)	89 (32)	112 (44)
Mean daily maximum °F (°C)	60.3 (15.7)	65.6 (18.7)	72.8 (22.7)	80.5 (26.9)	87.9 (31.1)	94.7 (34.8)	93.7 (34.3)	93.0 (33.9)	86.5 (30.3)	79.4 (26.3)	69.2 (20.7)	60.9 (16.1)	78.7 (25.9)
Daily mean °F (°C)	45.6 (7.6)	49.8 (9.9)	56.5 (13.6)	63.9 (17.7)	72.6 (22.6)	80.3 (26.8)	80.7 (27.1)	79.8 (26.6)	73.3 (22.9)	64.5 (18.1)	53.6 (12.0)	46.1 (7.8)	63.9 (17.7)
Mean daily minimum °F (°C)	31.0 (−0.6)	34.1 (1.2)	40.3 (4.6)	47.3 (8.5)	57.2 (14.0)	65.9 (18.8)	67.7 (19.8)	66.7 (19.3)	60.2 (15.7)	49.6 (9.8)	38.1 (3.4)	31.3 (−0.4)	49.1 (9.5)
Record low °F (°C)	−8 (−22)	−9 (−23)	9 (−13)	26 (−3)	29 (−2)	44 (7)	55 (13)	50 (10)	39 (4)	21 (−6)	10 (−12)	2 (−17)	−9 (−23)
Average precipitation inches (mm)	0.66 (17)	0.41 (10)	0.38 (9.7)	0.50 (13)	1.05 (27)	1.13 (29)	1.82 (46)	1.87 (47)	2.02 (51)	1.09 (28)	0.60 (15)	0.57 (14)	12.10 (307)
Average snowfall inches (cm)	0.2 (0.51)	0.0 (0.0)	0.0 (0.0)	0.0 (0.0)	0.0 (0.0)	0.0 (0.0)	0.0 (0.0)	0.0 (0.0)	0.0 (0.0)	0.0 (0.0)	0.0 (0.0)	0.4 (1.0)	0.6 (1.5)
Average precipitation days (≥ 0.01 in)	2.0	1.1	1.2	1.5	2.8	3.6	4.2	3.7	3.9	2.5	1.4	1.3	29.2
Average snowy days (≥ 0.1 in)	0.1	0.0	0.0	0.0	0.0	0.0	0.0	0.0	0.0	0.0	0.0	0.1	0.2
Source: NOAA
