= Eupaludestrina =

Scientific classification
- Kingdom: Animalia
- Phylum: Mollusca
- Class: Gastropoda
- Subclass: Caenogastropoda
- Order: Littorinimorpha
- Family: Cochliopidae
- Subfamily: Semisalsinae
- Genus: Eupaludestrina; Mabille, 1877

Synonyms
- Semisalsa Radoman, 1974

Genus of freshwater snails

Eupaludestrina is a genus of gastropods belonging to the family Cochliopidae.

The species of this genus are found in Europe.

Species:

- Eupaludestrina achaja (Clessin, 1878)
- Eupaludestrina acilacustris (Schütt, 1991)
- Eupaludestrina aponensis (E.von Martens, 1858)
- Eupaludestrina bigugliana (Caziot, 1908)
- Eupaludestrina canariensis (Mousson, 1872)
- Eupaludestrina contempta (Dautzenberg, 1894)
- Eupaludestrina dalmatica Radoman, 1974
- Eupaludestrina dobrogica (Grossu & Negrea, 1989)
- Eupaludestrina foxianensis (De Stefani, 1883)
- Eupaludestrina galileae (Preston, 1914)
- Eupaludestrina longiscata (Bourguignat, 1856)
- Eupaludestrina macei (Paladilhe, 1867)
- Eupaludestrina maltzani (Westerlund, 1886)
- Eupaludestrina musaensis (Frauenfeld, 1856)
- Eupaludestrina rausiana (Radoman, 1974)
- Eupaludestrina rhoenana (Kadolsky, 2008)
- Eupaludestrina scamandri (Boeters, Monod & Vala, 1977)
- Eupaludestrina spinellii (Gredler, 1860)
- Eupaludestrina stagnorum (Gmelin, 1791)
- Eupaludestrina steindachneri (Westerlund, 1902)
- Eupaludestrina sublongiscata (Schütt, 1988)
