= Overlook Park (Oviedo, Florida) =

Park in Oviedo, Florida, United States

- Location within Florida
- Location: Oviedo, Seminole County, Florida, United States
- Coordinates: 28°41′56″N 81°14′15″W
- Area: 3 acres (1.2 ha)
- Open: 5 AM to 11 PM

Overlook Park is an urban park in Oviedo, Florida, US. The park is 3 acres (1.2 ha) in area on the south shore of Lake Jesup. It is home to Clifton Springs, a mineral spring that flows from a pond into a canal and on to Lake Jesup.

== Amenities ==
The park has access for picnicking, BBQ, boating, and fishing. There is also a boardwalk and a pavilion.

== Location ==
=== Address ===
1988 Spring Ave, Oviedo, FL 32765
