= Littoridinops palustris =

Conservation status
- Least Concern (IUCN 3.1)

- Vulnerable (NatureServe)

Scientific classification
- Kingdom: Animalia
- Phylum: Mollusca
- Class: Gastropoda
- Subclass: Caenogastropoda
- Order: Littorinimorpha
- Family: Hydrobiidae
- Genus: Littoridinops
- Species: L. palustris

Binomial name
- Littoridinops palustris Thompson, 1968

Species of gastropod

Littoridinops palustris is a species of very small aquatic snail, an operculate gastropod mollusk in the family Hydrobiidae.

== Description ==
The maximum recorded shell length is 4.5 mm.

== Habitat ==
Minimum recorded depth is 0 m. Maximum recorded depth is 0 m.
