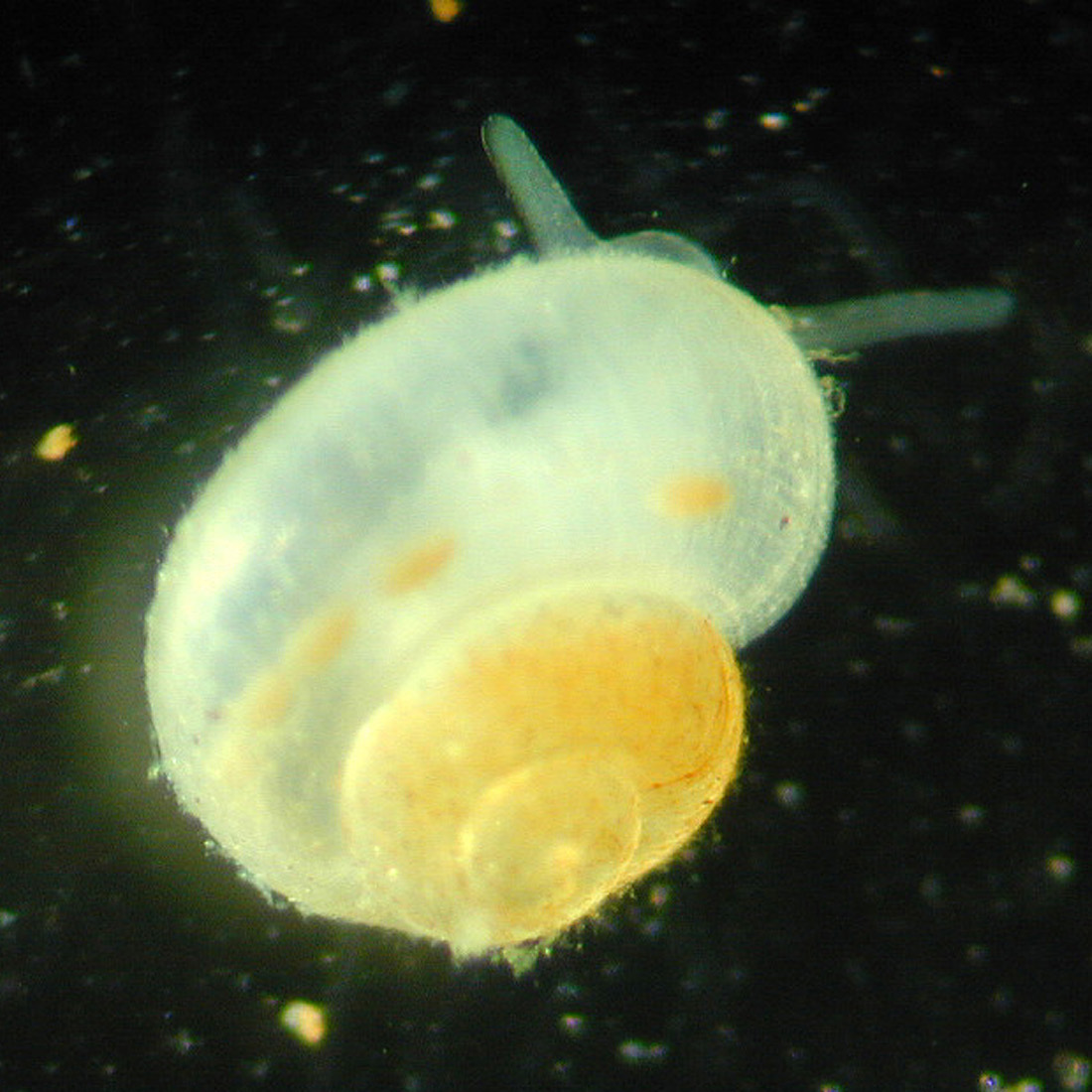
- A live individual of Antrobia culveri

Scientific classification
- Kingdom: Animalia
- Phylum: Mollusca
- Class: Gastropoda
- Subclass: Caenogastropoda
- Order: Littorinimorpha
- Superfamily: Truncatelloidea
- Family: Cochliopidae; Tryon, 1866

Synonyms
- Semisalsinae Giusti & Pezzoli, 1980

= Cochliopidae =

Family of gastropods

Cochliopidae is a family of small freshwater snails with gills and an operculum, aquatic gastropod mollusks.

Paludestrina d'Orbigny, 1840 is an archaic synonym, and has been placed on the Official Index of Rejected and Invalid Names by ICZN Opinion 2202.

This family is in the superfamily Truncatelloidea and in the order Littorinimorpha (according to the taxonomy of the Gastropoda by Bouchet & Rocroi, 2005).

== Description ==
Cochliopidae snails are characterized by sharp, elongated spire-like structures, and can be found in rivers or brackish water.

== 2005 taxonomy ==
The family Cochliopidae consists of 3 subfamilies (according to the taxonomy of the Gastropoda by Bouchet & Rocroi, 2005):

- Cochliopinae Tryon, 1866 - synonyms: Mexithaumatinae D. W. Taylor, 1966, Paludiscalinae D. W. Taylor, 1966
- Littoridininae Thiele, 1928
- Semisalsinae Guiusti & Pezzoli, 1980 - synonym: Heleobiini Bernasconi, 1991

== Genera ==
Liu et al. (2001) have recognized 34 genera with more than 260 species within the subfamily Cochliopinae.

Strong et al. (2008) have recognized 246 freshwater species within Cochliopidae.

Genera within the family Cochliopidae include:

subfamily Cochliopinae

- Aphaostracon F. G. Thompson, 1968
- Coahuilix Taylor, 1966
- Cochliopa Stimpson, 1865 - type genus of the family Cochliopidae
- Cochliopina Morrison, 1946
- Emmericiella Pilsbry, 1909
- Lobogenes Pilsbry & Bequaert, 1927
- Mexithauma D. W. Taylor, 1966
- Nanivitrea Thiele, 1927
- Subcochliopa J. P. E. Morrison, 1946
- Tepalcatia F. G. Thompson & Hershler, 2002

subfamily Littoridininae

- Antrobia Hubricht, 1971 - with the only species Antrobia culveri Hubricht, 1971 - Tumbling Creek cavesnail
- Littoridina Souleyet, 1852
- Pseudocaspia Starobogatov, 1972
- Pseudotryonia Hershler, 2001
  - Pseudotryonia adamantina
  - Pseudotryonia alamosae
  - Pseudotryonia brevissima
  - Pseudotryonia grahamae
  - Pseudotryonia mica Hershler, Liu & Landye, 2011
  - Pseudotryonia pasajae Hershler, Liu & Landye, 2011

subfamily Semisalsinae

- Heleobia Stimpson, 1865
- Heleobops Thompson, 1968
- Paludiscala D. W. Taylor, 1966
- Semisalsa Radoman, 1974

subfamily ? (either Cochliopinae or Littoridininae)

- Aroapyrgus H. B. Baker, 1931
- Balconorbis Hershler & Longley, 1986
- † Carinulorbis Yen, 1949
- Chorrobius Hershler, Liu & Landye, 2011
- Dyris Conrad, 1871 - it has extant species and also 26 species in Miocene Pebas Formation
- Eremopyprgus Hershler, 1999
- † Feliconcha Wesselingh, Anderson & Kadolsky, 2006 - two species from Miocene of the Pebas Formation
  - Feliconcha feliconcha Wesselingh, Anderson & Kadolsky, 2006
  - Feliconcha reticulata Wesselingh, Anderson & Kadolsky, 2006
- (probably extant) Glabertryonia Wesselingh, Anderson & Kadolsky, 2006 - three species
  - † Glabertryonia glabra Wesselingh, Anderson & Kadolsky, 2006 - from Miocene of the Pebas Formation
  - † Glabertryonia sp. 1 - from Pliocene of the Las Piedras Formation
  - (probably extant) Glabertryonia sp. 2 - from Holocene of Surinam, probably extant
- Juturnia Hershler, Liu & Stockwell, 2002
- Lithococcus Pilsbry, 1911
- Mesobia F. G. Thompson & Hershler, 1991
- Mexipyrgus Taylor, 1966
- Minckleyella Hershler, Liu & Landye, 2011 - with the only species Minckleyella balnearis Hershler, Liu & Landye, 2011
- Onobops Thompson, 1968
- Pyrgophorus Ancey, 1888
- Sioliella Haas, 1949
- Spurwinkia Davis, Mazurkiewicz & Mandracchia, 1982
- Texadina Abbott & Ladd, 1951
- Thalassobia Bourguignat in Mabille, 1877

== Cladogram ==
A cladogram based on sequences of mitochondrial cytochrome-c oxidase I (COI) genes showing phylogenic relations of species within Cochliopidae:

- Cochliopidae
  - - - Onobops jacksoni
      - Heleobops docimus, Heleobops dalmatica
    - - - - Cochliopina riograndensis
          - - Cochliopa sp.
            - Lithococcus multicarinatus
        - - Mexithauma quadripaludium
          - Aroapyrgus sp.
      - - - - Eremopyrgus eganensis
            - Zetekina sp. 1, Zetekina sp. 2
          - - - "Tryonia" brevissima, "Tryonia" alamosae
              - Aphaostracon sp.
            - - - - Littoridinops monroensis, Littoridinops palustris
                  - Pyrgophorus platyrachis
                - - "Tryonia" kosteri
                  - Durangonella coahuilae
              - Spurwikinia salsa
        - - Tryonia clathrata, Tryonia rowlandsi, Tryonia aequicostata
          - Mexipyrgus carranzae
  - "Tryonia" robusta
